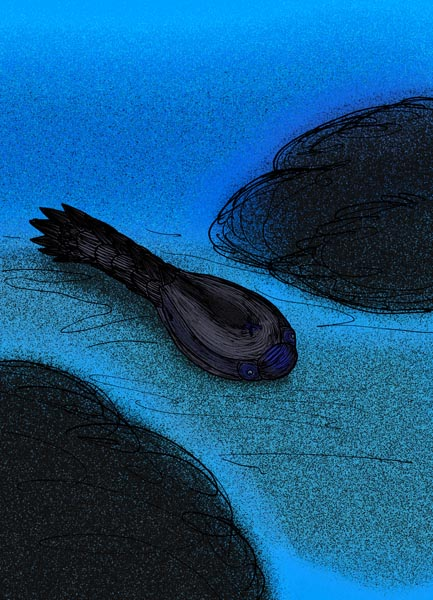
- Cyathaspis banksii reconstruction

Scientific classification
- Domain: Eukaryota
- Kingdom: Animalia
- Phylum: Chordata
- Infraphylum: Agnatha
- Class: †Pteraspidomorpha
- Subclass: †Heterostraci
- Order: †Cyathaspidiformes
- Clade: †Cyathaspidida

Families
- Cyathaspidae; Ariaspidae; Ctenaspidae

= Cyathaspidida =

Cyathaspidida Temporal range: Silurian–Early Devonian

Extinct clade of jawless fishes

Cyathaspidida is a taxon of extinct cyathaspidiform heterostracan agnathans whose fossils are found in Silurian to Lower Devonian marine strata of Europe and North America. In life, they are thought to be benthic animals that lived most of their lives either mostly buried in or resting directly on top of the substrate.

== Taxonomy ==
The cyathaspidids of Cyathaspidida were tadpole-like animals with drum-shaped, cigar-shaped or wedge-shaped cephalothoraxes, and were anatomically similar to several other heterostracan groups. However, with some groups, such as the traquairaspids, cardiopeltids, and corvaspidids, this similarity appears to be superficial. With other groups, namely the tolypelepidids, the similarity suggests a close relationship. The type genus of the tolypelepidids, Tolypelepis, in particular, was determined to be the sister-taxon of Cyathaspidida. Originally, the cyathaspidid genera were organized together within the family Cyathaspididae. Later, the genera were then organized into subfamilies, and these subfamilies would eventually be promoted to full familial status, including Irregularaspididae, Anglaspididae, Poraspididae, Ctenaspididae, etc. In 2013, Lundgren and Blom reassessed several specimens of cyathaspidids, and reorganized them into three families, Cyathaspidae, Ariaspidae and Ctenaspidae.

=== Cyathaspidae ===
Cyathaspidae contains most of the genera originally contained within Cyathaspididae, as well as those genera contained within Irregularaspididae, and Poraspididae. In addition to the type genus, Cyathaspis, Cyathaspidae contains the following genera: Americaspis, Archegonaspis, Capitaspis, Dikenaspis, Dinaspidella, Homaspidella, Irregulareaspis, Nahanniaspis, Pionaspis, Poraspis, Ptomaspis, Seretaspis, Steinaspis, Torpedaspis, and Vernonaspis.

=== Ariaspidae ===
Family Ariaspidae contains Ariaspis, and its sister-taxa originally contained within Anglaspididae/Anglaspidinae, including Anglaspis, Listraspis, Liliaspis, and Paraliliaspis.

=== Ctenaspidae ===
If Amphiaspidida can be ignored as a daughter-taxon, the family Ctenaspidae contains Ctenaspis and its various sister-taxa originally contained within both Ctenaspididae and Ctenaspididae, including Allocryptaspis, Alainaspis, Zaphoctenaspis, Arctictenaspis, and Boothiaspis, which was first described as a "Canadian amphiaspid."

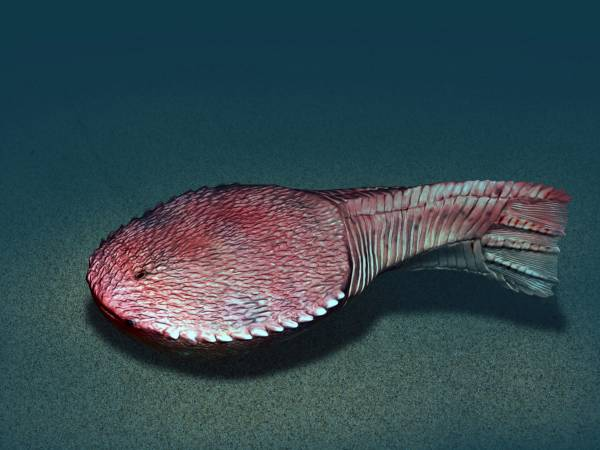
Life reconstruction of Ctenaspis dentata
