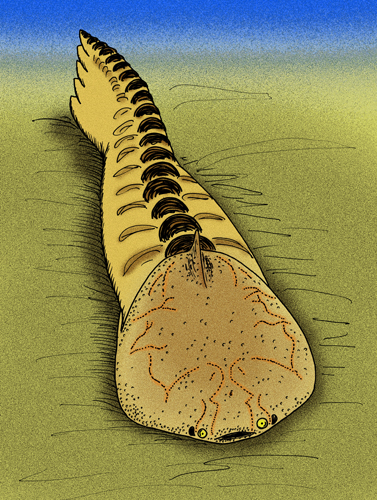
- Amphiaspis argo reconstruction

Scientific classification
- Kingdom: Animalia
- Phylum: Chordata
- Infraphylum: Agnatha
- Class: †Pteraspidomorpha
- Subclass: †Heterostraci
- Order: †Cyathaspidiformes
- Clade: †Amphiaspidida
- Superfamily: †Amphiaspidoidei

Families
- Amphiaspididae; Edaphaspididae; Gabreyaspididae; Olbiaspididae

= Amphiaspidoidei =

Amphiaspidoidei Temporal range: Early Devonian

Extinct superfamily of jawless fishes

Amphiaspidoidei is a taxon of extinct amphiaspidid heterostracan agnathans whose fossils are restricted to Lower Devonian marine strata of Siberia near the Taimyr Peninsula. In life, the amphiaspidids of Amphiaspidoidei are thought to be benthic animals that lived most of their lives mostly buried in the sediment of a series of hypersaline lagoons. Amphiaspids are easily distinguished from other heterostracans in that all of the plates of the cephalothorax armor are fused into a single, muff-like unit, so that the forebody of the living animal would have looked like a potpie or a hot waterbottle with a pair of small, or degenerated eyes flanked by preorbital openings, a pair of branchial openings for exhaling, and a simple, slit-like mouth.

== Taxonomy ==
The superfamily Amphiaspidoidei contains four families.

=== Amphiaspididae ===
This family contains two monotypic genera, including the type genus Amphiaspis, and Amphoraspis

=== Edaphaspididae ===
This family is monotypic, and contains the monotypic genus Edaphaspis.

=== Gabreyaspididae ===
This family contains four genera, Gabreyaspis, Prosarctaspis, Pelaspis, and Tareyaspis.

=== Olbiaspididae ===
This family contains three genera, Olbiaspis, Kureykaspis and Angaraspis.
