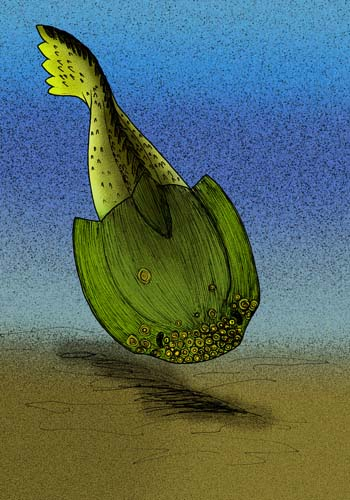
- Reconstruction of Gabreyaspis

Scientific classification
- Kingdom: Animalia
- Phylum: Chordata
- Infraphylum: Agnatha
- Class: †Pteraspidomorpha
- Subclass: †Heterostraci
- Order: †Cyathaspidiformes
- Superfamily: †Amphiaspidoidei
- Family: †Gabreyaspididae

Genera
- Gabreyaspis; Prosarctaspis; Pelaspis; Tareyaspis

= Gabreyaspididae =

Gabreyaspididae Temporal range: Early Devonian

Extinct family of jawless fishes

Gabreyaspididae is a family of extinct amphiaspidid heterostracan agnathans whose fossils are restricted to Lower Devonian marine strata of Siberia near the Taimyr Peninsula. In life, all amphiaspidids are thought to be benthic animals that lived most of their lives mostly buried in the sediment of a series of hypersaline lagoons. Amphiaspids are easily distinguished from other heterostracans in that all of the plates of the cephalothoracic armor are fused into a single, muff-like unit, so that the forebody of the living animal would have looked, in the case of gabreyaspidids, vaguely like a horseshoe crab with a pair of small, or degenerated eyes, with each flanked by a preorbital opening, and a simple, slit-like mouth positioned slightly ventrally.

Gabreyaspidids differ from the amphiaspidoid amphiaspids of Amphiaspididae primarily due to ornamentation unique to each family, and differs from amphiaspidoid amphiaspids of Olbiaspididae in that gabreyaspidids' mouths are ventrally positioned, whereas the mouths of olbiaspidids are positioned anteriorly.

== Taxonomy ==
=== Gabreyaspis ===
Gabreyaspis tarda is the type species of the family, and is known from several mostly complete cephalothoracic armors. It has a woodgrain-like ornamentation over its armor, with several tesserae-like units, especially around the head-region.

=== Prosarctaspis ===
Prosarctaspis taimyrica has a broad, flat, half-circle-shaped armor that looks vaguely like a horseshoe crab.

=== Pelaspis ===
Pelaspis teres differs from other gabreyaspidids in its unique ornamentation, the shape of its cephalothoracic armor, which is oval-circular, and suggestive of a pizza or a cookie, and its apparent lack of a dorsal spine.

=== Tareyaspis ===
Tareyaspis venusta is similar in size and dimensions to Pelaspis, but differs in ornamentation, and the shape of the posterior region of the cephalothoracic armor, which, in T. venusta, has a dorsal spine.
