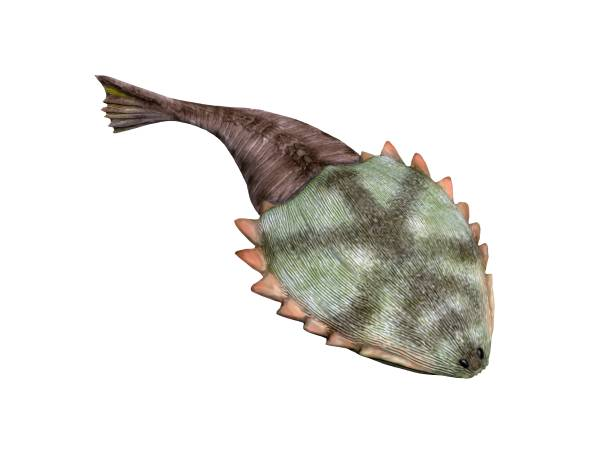
- Hibernaspis macrolepis

Scientific classification
- Kingdom: Animalia
- Phylum: Chordata
- Infraphylum: Agnatha
- Class: †Pteraspidomorpha
- Subclass: †Heterostraci
- Order: †Cyathaspidiformes
- Clade: †Amphiaspidida
- Superfamily: †Hibernaspidoidei
- Family: †Hibernaspididae; Obruchev, 1939
- Genus: †Hibernaspis; Obruchev, 1939

Type species
- Hibernaspis macrolepis Obruchev, 1939

Species
- Hibernaspis macrolepis; Hibernaspis tenuicristata

= Hibernaspis =

Hibernaspis Temporal range: Early Devonian

Extinct genus of jawless fishes

Hibernaspis is a genus of extinct amphiaspidid heterostracan agnathans whose fossils are restricted to Lower Devonian marine strata of Siberia near the Taimyr Peninsula. In life, species of Hibernaspis were thought to be benthic animals that lived most of their lives mostly buried in the sediment of a series of hypersaline lagoons. All amphiaspids are easily distinguished from other heterostracans in that all of the plates of the cephalothorax armor are fused into a single, muff-like unit, so that, in the case of Hibernaspis, the forebody of the living animal would have looked like a large guitar pic with serrated edges, with a pair of tiny, degenerated eyes, a pair of branchial openings for exhaling, and a simple, slit-like mouth at the anterior end.

There are two species of Hibernaspis, H. macrolepis, the type species, and H. tenuicristata. Each species differs from each other through shapes of the serrated edges, and micrornamentation of the cephalothoracic armor.
