= Siberiaspidoidei =

Siberiaspidoidei Temporal range: Early Devonian

Scientific classification
- Kingdom: Animalia
- Phylum: Chordata
- Infraphylum: Agnatha
- Class: †Pteraspidomorpha
- Subclass: †Heterostraci
- Order: †Cyathaspidiformes
- Clade: †Amphiaspidida
- Superfamily: †Siberiaspidoidei

Families
- Siberiaspididae; Tuxeraspididae

Synonyms
- Amphiaspidiformes

Extinct superfamily of jawless fishes

Siberiaspidoidei is a taxon of extinct amphiaspidid heterostracan agnathans whose fossils are restricted to Lower Devonian marine strata of Siberia near the Taimyr Peninsula. In life, siberiaspids are thought to be benthic animals that lived most of their lives mostly buried in the sediment of a series of hypersaline lagoons. As with all amphiaspids, siberiaspids are easily distinguished from other heterostracans in that all of the plates of the cephalothorax armor are fused into a single, muff-like unit, so that the forebody of the living animal would have looked like a flattened potpie or a hot waterbottle with a pair of small, or degenerated eyes sometimes flanked by preorbital openings, a pair of branchial openings for exhaling, and a simple, slit-like, or tube-like mouth.

== Taxonomy ==
Siberiaspidoidei contains two families, Siberiaspididae, and Tuxeraspididae.

=== Siberiaspididae ===
This family contains two monotypic genera, Siberiaspis, and Argyriaspis.

=== Tuxeraspididae ===
This family contains three monotypic genera, Tuxeraspis, Litotaspis, and Dotaspis. Tuxeraspis and Litoaspis are known primarily from fragments and portions of the head-region, while Dotaspis is known from a mostly intact headshield. These fragments, together with the anatomy of Dotaspis suggest the animals had large, flattened, circular cephalothoracic armor.
