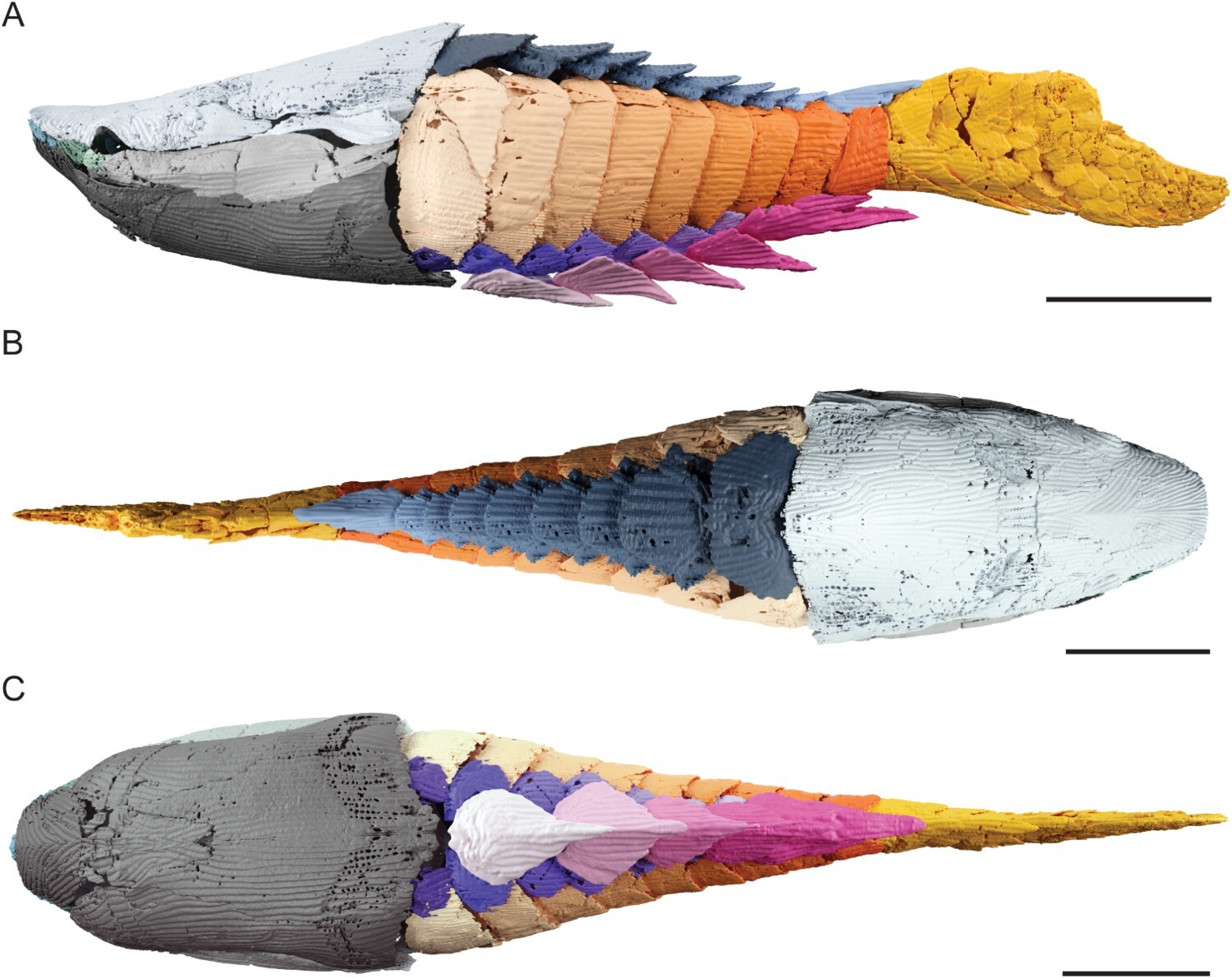
- Reconstructed skeleton of Anglaspis heintzi

Scientific classification
- Kingdom: Animalia
- Phylum: Chordata
- Infraphylum: Agnatha
- Class: †Pteraspidomorpha
- Subclass: †Heterostraci
- Order: †Cyathaspidiformes
- Family: †Ariaspidae
- Genus: †Anglaspis

= Anglaspis =

Anglaspis Temporal range: Late Silurian - Early Devonian

Extinct genus of jawless fishes

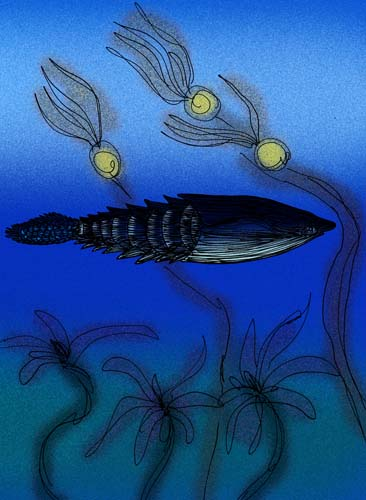
Life restoration of Anglaspis macculloughi

Anglaspis is an extinct genus of cyathaspidiform heterostracan agnathan. Fossils are found in marine strata of Europe, from the late Silurian period until the genus' extinction during the Early Devonian. As with other cyathaspidiforms, individuals of Anglaspis had dorsal and ventral plates covering the forebody, gill pouches, and nasal openings that lay on the roof of the oral cavity.

Late Silurian species of Anglaspis are found in marine strata of Wales and England, while most of the Early Devonian species are found in the Devonian-aged strata of Spitsbergen island, in Svalbard, Norway.

== Taxonomy ==
Anglaspis was, at various times, placed in the families Cyathaspididae, Poraspididae, and in its own family, Anglaspididae. Currently, it is placed in Ariaspidae with Ariaspis, and Listraspis, and is considered to be closely related to, if not the progenitor of Liliaspis and Paraliliaspis.
