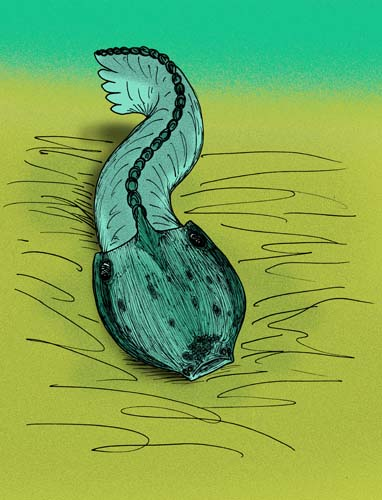
- reconstruction of Olbiaspis coalescens

Scientific classification
- Kingdom: Animalia
- Phylum: Chordata
- Infraphylum: Agnatha
- Class: †Pteraspidomorpha
- Subclass: †Heterostraci
- Order: †Amphiaspidiformes
- Suborder: †Amphiaspidoidei
- Family: †Olbiaspididae; Obruchev, 1964

Genera
- Olbiaspis; Kureykaspis; Angaraspis

= Olbiaspididae =

Olbiaspididae Temporal range: Early Devonian

Extinct family of jawless fishes

Olbiaspididae is a family of extinct amphiaspidid heterostracan agnathans whose fossils are restricted to Lower Devonian marine strata of Siberia near the Taimyr Peninsula. In life, all amphiaspidids are thought to be benthic animals that lived most of their lives mostly buried in the sediment of a series of hypersaline lagoons. Amphiaspids are easily distinguished from other heterostracans in that all of the plates of the cephalothoracic armor are fused into a single, muff-like unit, so that the forebody of the living animal would have looked, in the case of olbiaspidids, vaguely like a hot water bottle with a pair of small, or degenerated eyes, with each flanked by a preorbital opening, and a simple, slit-like mouth positioned at the anteriormost portion of the cephalothoracic armor.

Olbiaspidids differ from the amphiaspidoid amphiaspids of Amphiaspididae in that olbiaspidids have wing-like extensions of the cephalothoracic armor that the genera of Amphiaspididae lack, and differ from amphiaspidoid amphiaspids of Gabreyaspididae in that gabreyaspidids' mouths are ventrally positioned, whereas the mouths of olbiaspidids are positioned anteriorly.

== Taxonomy ==
=== Olbiaspis ===
This is the type genus of the family, and has two species, O. coalescens, and O. latissima. O. coalescens resembles a hot water bottle with dorso-anteriorly positioned small eyes flanked by preorbital openings, and a prominent dorsal spine, while O. latissima is extremely broad in comparison.

=== Kureykaspis ===
Kureykaspis salebrosa has a compact cephalothoracic armor that is pear-shaped (when viewed from above), and that is decorated with distinctive ridges and nodules. The armor has lateral wings with serrated edges. The dorsal spine is vestigial or lacking.

=== Angaraspis ===
Angaraspis urvantzevi differs from other olbiaspidids in having a rhomboid-shaped cephalothoracic armor. Like Olbiaspis, A. urvantzevi has a prominent dorsal spine.
