= Hibernaspidoidei =

Hibernaspidoidei Temporal range: Early Devonian

Scientific classification
- Kingdom: Animalia
- Phylum: Chordata
- Infraphylum: Agnatha
- Class: †Pteraspidomorpha
- Subclass: †Heterostraci
- Order: †Amphiaspidiformes
- Suborder: †Hibernaspidoidei

Families
- Hibernaspididae; Eglonaspididae; Aphataspididae

Extinct superfamily of jawless fishes

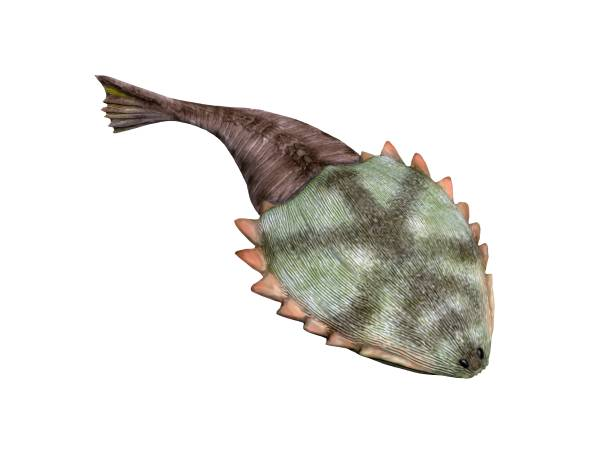
Life reconstruction of Hibernaspis macrolepis

Hibernaspidoidei is a taxon of extinct amphiaspidid heterostracan agnathans whose fossils are restricted to Lower Devonian marine strata of Siberia near the Taimyr Peninsula. In life, hibernaspid amphiaspidids are thought to be benthic animals that lived most of their lives mostly buried in the sediment of a series of hypersaline lagoons. All amphiaspids are easily distinguished from other heterostracans in that all of the plates of the cephalothorax armor are fused into a single, muff-like unit, so that the forebody of the living animal would have looked like a potpie or a hot waterbottle with a pair of small, or degenerated eyes, a pair of branchial openings for exhaling, and, in the case of hibernaspids, a simple, slit-like mouth at the anterior end of a tube-like head.

== Taxonomy ==
Hibernaspidoidei contains three families.

=== Hibernaspididae ===
This family is monotypic, containing only the genus Hibernaspis. They have a flattened, "subtriangular head and trunk armor".

=== Eglonaspididae ===
This is a diverse family that contains five monotypic genera, including Eglonaspis, Gerronaspis, Lecaniaspis, Empedaspis, and Pelurgaspis.

=== Aphataspididae ===
This family contains two monotypic genera, Aphataspis and Putoranaspis.
