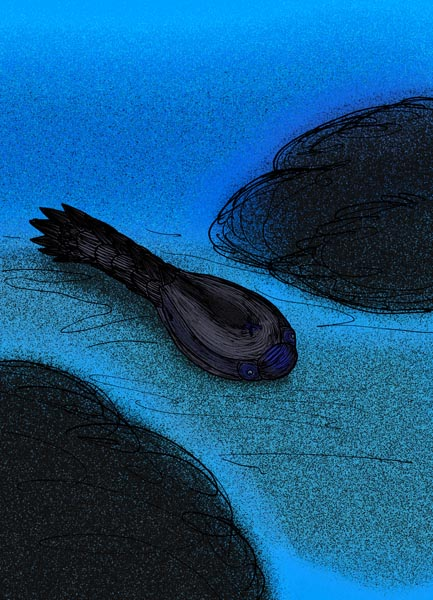
- Reconstruction of Cyathaspis banksii

Scientific classification
- Kingdom: Animalia
- Phylum: Chordata
- Infraphylum: Agnatha
- Class: †Pteraspidomorpha
- Subclass: †Heterostraci
- Order: †Cyathaspidiformes

Suborders, superfamilies and families
- Cyathaspidida; Ariaspidae; Ctenaspididae; Cyathaspidae; Amphiaspidida?; Amphiaspidoidei; Amphiaspididae; Edaphaspididae; Gabreyaspididae; Olbiaspididae; Hibernaspidoidei; Aphataspididae; Eglonaspididae; Hibernaspididae; Siberiaspidoidei; Siberiaspididae; Tuxeraspididae

Synonyms
- Amphiaspidiformes Berg 1940

= Cyathaspidiformes =

Cyathaspidiformes Temporal range: Silurian-Devonian

Extinct order of jawless fishes

Cyathaspidiformes is an extinct order of heterostracan vertebrates known from extensive fossil remains primarily from Silurian to Early Devonian strata of Europe, and North America, and from Early Devonian marine strata of Siberia.

== Anatomy ==
Like their descendants, the pteraspidids, all cyathaspidiform heterostracans had the cephalothorax enclosed in armor, formed from several plates, including dorsal, ventral, a dorsal spine derived from a scale, and a large, scale-covered tail. Thus, the living animals would have resembled tadpoles encased in massive armor. The majority of taxa have the rostral and pineal plates fused or merged with the dorsal plate, and in the amphiaspidids, all the plates of the cephalothorax were fused together into a single "muff-like" unit. Unlike the pteraspidids, all cyathaspidiforms are thought to be almost uniformly benthic in lifestyle, though only the amphiaspids and the ctenaspids are thought to be burrowers.

== Taxonomy ==
The taxonomy of Cyathaspidiformes is a convoluted affair, as taking into account of several of the various problematic heterostracan taxa which strongly or superficially resemble cyathaspidiforms, such as Cardipeltis, Traquairaspis, Corvaspis and Tolypelepidida, Cyathaspidiformes appears to be polyphyletic. Phylogenetic analyses suggest that the tolypelepidid genera, including Athenaegis, Asketaspis, and in particular, Tolypelepis, are the sister-taxa of cyathaspidiforms.

Even within the order, there is much debate about organizing the taxa. Until recently, there were several families within the suborder Cyathaspidida, including Cyathaspididae, Irregularaspididae, Anglaspididae, Poraspididae, etc. In a phylogenetic survey in 2013 by Lundgren and Blom, the various families and genera within Cyathaspidida are reorganized into three families, Cyathaspidae, Ctenaspidae, and Ariaspidae. The suborder Amphiaspidida, traditionally thought of as the daughter or sister-taxon of Ctenaspididae/Ctenaspidae, was excluded from this particular survey, as, while the authors did not directly challenge this idea, they excluded Amphiaspidida from the survey, noting that that group was "extremely derived and virtually impossible" to be of any use to this survey.

== Taxa ==
Cyathaspidiformes is divided into two suborders, Cyathaspidida and Amphiaspidida. The former has the cephalothorax armor divided into several plates, while the latter have the cephalothorax armor fused into a single "muff-like" unit.

=== Cyathaspidida ===
Typical cyathaspidid heterostracans were fusiform or cigar-shaped animals. Their fossils are found in Silurian and early Devonian marine and marginal marine strata of North America, Europe, and the Ural Mountains. Kiangsuaspis, from Silurian Chinese marine strata, was originally thought to be a Chinese cyathaspidid, until it was then reappraised as a phyllocarid crustacean. Currently, the taxa of this suborder are divided into three families.

==== Cyathaspidae ====
Cyathaspidae encompasses the taxa of the families Cyathaspididae, Irregularaspididae, and Poraspididae.

==== Ariaspidae ====
Ariaspidae encompasses the taxa Ariaspis and the taxa formerly contained within Anglaspididae (Anglaspis, Liliaspis and Paraliliaspis).

==== Ctenaspidae ====
Ctenaspidae encompasses the ctenaspids, (Ctenaspis, Arctictenaspis and Zaphoctenaspis), and the allocryptaspids (Boothiaspis, Allocryptaspis and Alainaspis). Boothiaspis, from the Boothia Peninsula, was originally described as a Canadian amphiaspidid.

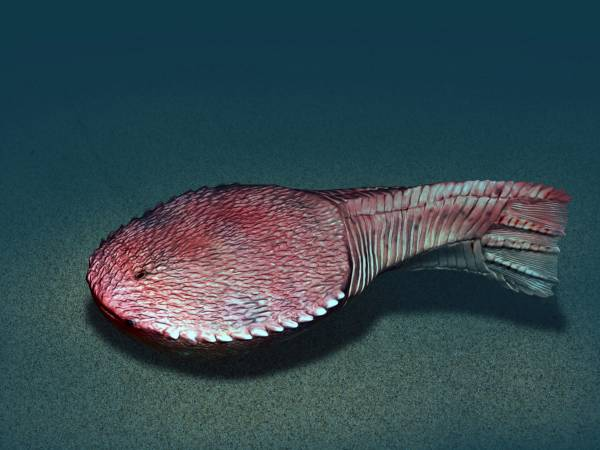
Life reconstruction of Ctenaspis dentata

=== Amphiaspidida ===
All the cyathaspidiforms of Suborder Amphiaspidida, sometimes treated as a distinct order "Amphiaspidiformes," are endemic to Lower Devonian marine strata of what is now the Taimyr Peninsula, Siberia, in what was once a series of hypersaline lagoons cut off from the ocean. In addition to having the plates of the cephalothorax armor fused together to form a muff-like unit shaped like a pot pie or a hot water bottle, all amphiaspidids had a simple, slit-shaped mouth, and reduced or no eyes. These adaptations suggest that the living animals were filter- or suspension-feeders that habitually buried themselves in the substrate.
