= Capitaspis =

Capitaspis Temporal range: Late Silurian, Pridoli

Scientific classification
- Domain: Eukaryota
- Kingdom: Animalia
- Phylum: Chordata
- Infraphylum: Agnatha
- Class: †Pteraspidomorpha
- Subclass: †Heterostraci
- Order: †Cyathaspidiformes
- Family: †Cyathaspididae
- Subfamily: †Cyathaspidinae
- Genus: †Capitaspis; Elliott, 2013

Type species
- †Capitaspis giblingi Elliott, 2013

Extinct genus of jawless fishes

Capitaspis is an extinct genus of cyathaspidine cyathaspidid heterostracan jawless vertebrate known from the Late Silurian Somerset Island Formation (Pridolian epoch) of the Northwest Territories, Canada. It contains a single species, Capitaspis giblingi. It is most closely related to Pionaspis.
