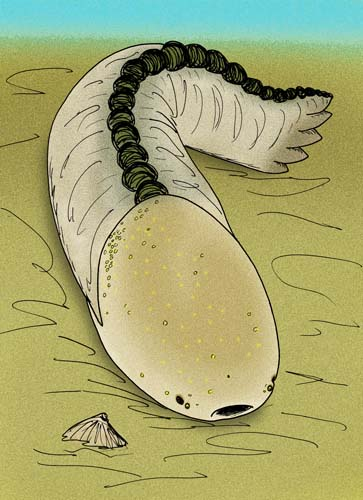
- Amphoraspis stellata reconstruction

Scientific classification
- Kingdom: Animalia
- Phylum: Chordata
- Infraphylum: Agnatha
- Class: †Pteraspidomorpha
- Subclass: †Heterostraci
- Order: †Cyathaspidiformes
- Family: †Amphiaspididae
- Genus: †Amphoraspis
- Species: †A. stellata

Binomial name
- †Amphoraspis stellata Novitskaya & Karatayute, 1989

= Amphoraspis =

Amphiaspis argo Temporal range: Early Devonian

Extinct genus of jawless fishes

Amphoraspis stellata is an amphiaspidid heterostracan in the family Amphiaspididae. Its fossils are restricted to early Devonian-aged marine strata of the Taimyr Peninsula, Siberia. A. stellata, as with all other amphiaspidids, is thought to have been a benthic filter feeder that lived on top of, or buried just below the surface of the substrate of hypersaline lagoon-bottoms.

So far, A. stellata is known from at least one, 14 centimeter-long, broad and dorsally rounded cephalothoracic armor that is shaped vaguely like, as the generic name suggests, an amphora. The animal had small, possibly degenerate eyes that were flanked laterally by a small, crescent-shaped branchial opening. The small eyes, in turn, laterally flank a small, slit-shaped mouth at the center of the anterior-most end of the cephalothorax. The external surface of the armor has a unique micro-ornamentation of a pattern of star-like shapes.
