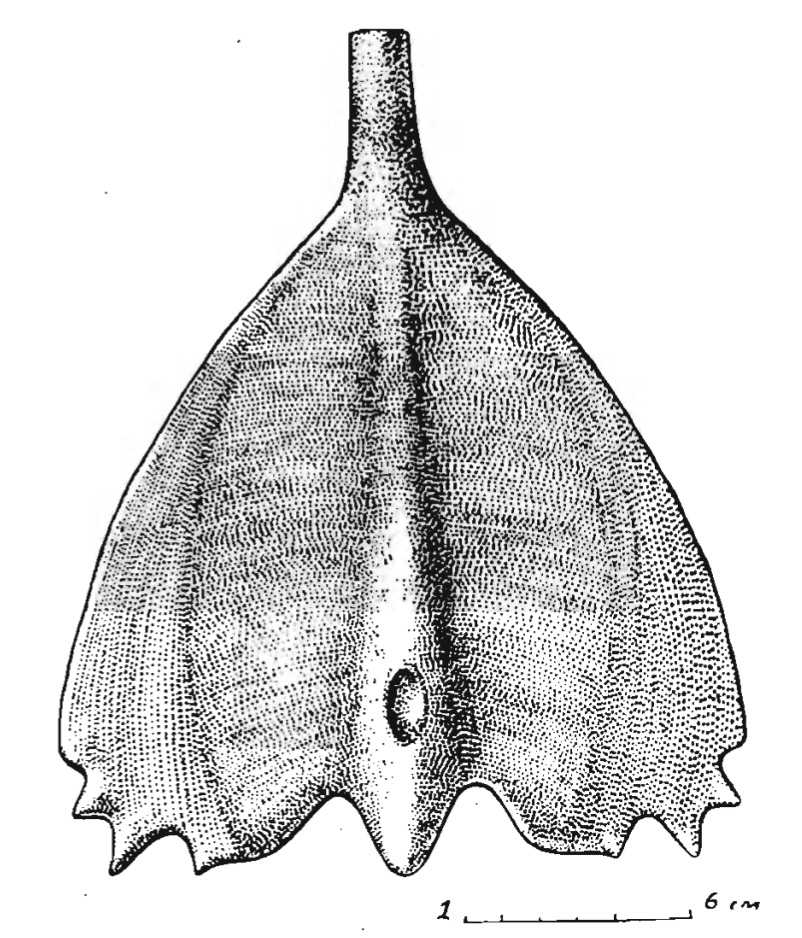
- Eglonaspis rostrata

Scientific classification
- Kingdom: Animalia
- Phylum: Chordata
- Infraphylum: Agnatha
- Class: †Pteraspidomorpha
- Subclass: †Heterostraci
- Order: †Amphiaspidiformes
- Suborder: †Hibernaspidoidei
- Family: †Eglonaspididae

Genera
- Eglonaspis; Gerronaspis; Lecaniaspis; Empedaspis; Pelurgaspis

= Eglonaspididae =

Eglonaspididae Temporal range: Early Devonian

Extinct family of jawless fishes

Eglonaspididae is a family of extinct amphiaspidid heterostracan agnathans, whose fossils are restricted to Lower Devonian, in marine strata of Siberia near the Taimyr Peninsula.

In life, all of the amphiaspidids are thought to be benthic animals that lived most of their lives mostly buried in the sediment of a series of hypersaline lagoons. Amphiaspids are easily distinguished from other heterostracans in that all of the plates of the cephalothoracic armor are fused into a single, muff-like unit, so that the forebody of the living animal would have looked, in the case of elgonaspidids, very much like a hot water bottle.

They were with or without a pair of small, degenerated eyes and a simple, slit-like mouth positioned at the anteriormost portion of the cephalothoracic armor.

== Taxonomy ==
=== Eglonaspis ===
Eglonaspis has a flattened, triangular-shaped cephalothoracic shield with large, crenulated fringes at the posteriolateral ends, and an elongated, tube-like head. Unlike most of its close relatives, has no trace of eyes, nor preorbital openings whatsoever (though, none of the other eglonaspidid genera have preorbital openings, either). The head of Eglonaspis has degenerated into a tube-like mouth which, according to researchers, is hypothesized to have permitted the living animal to filter-feed particles in the water column just above the surface of the substrate while the animal stayed buried beneath the substrate.

=== Gerronaspis ===
Gerronaspis was originally described as a species of Putoranaspis, as "Putoranaspis dentata," by Obruchev in 1964. In 1971, Novitskaya reappraised the species and separated it into a new genus. Gerronaspis has an oval-shaped cephalothoracic shield with crenulated fringes near the posteriolateral ends. The head is short, and has small orbital openings, albeit that are quite large when compared to the orbital openings of other eyed eglonaspidids like Empedaspis.

=== Lecanaspis ===
Lecanaspis is very similar in anatomy to Eglonaspis, that is, it has a triangular, plate-like cephalothorax. Although the head is missing in the holotype, later, more complete specimens show that, like Eglonaspis, Lecanaspis had an elongated, tubular head with no eyes.

=== Empedaspis ===
Empedaspis is thus far known only from a large fragment of the anterior portion of a large cephalothoracic shield. Enough of the fragment permits researchers to hypothesize that the complete cephalothorax would have been shaped like a hot water bottle, possibly with crenulated lateral wing-like extensions, and would have had a small tab-shaped head with small eyes.

=== Pelurgaspis ===
Pelurgaspis is known from an incomplete cephalothoracic shield that is triangular in shape. The intact shield may have been shaped like a corn kernel or a guitar pic. The small eyes of Pelurgaspis are positioned at the anterior-most end of the small head.
