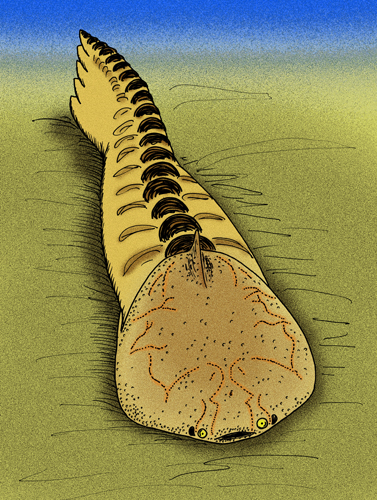
- Amphiaspis argo reconstruction

Scientific classification
- Kingdom: Animalia
- Phylum: Chordata
- Infraphylum: Agnatha
- Class: †Pteraspidomorpha
- Subclass: †Heterostraci
- Order: †Cyathaspidiformes
- Family: †Amphiaspididae
- Genus: †Amphiaspis
- Species: †A. argo

Binomial name
- †Amphiaspis argo Obruchev, 1936

= Amphiaspis =

Amphiaspis Temporal range: Early Emsian

Genus of fishes (fossil)

Amphiaspis argo is the type species of the cyathaspidid taxon Amphiaspidida, and of the family Amphiaspididae. Its fossils are restricted to early Emsian-aged marine strata of the Taimyr Peninsula, Early Devonian Siberia. A. argo, as with all other amphiaspidids, is thought to have been a benthic filter feeder that lived on top of, or buried just below the surface of the substrate of hypersaline lagoon-bottoms.

== Anatomy ==
So far, A. argos is known from at least one, incomplete cephalothoracic armor that is shaped vaguely like a pillow and is, from anterior to posterior, 24 centimeters long. The armor has a pattern of lateral sensory line canals. There is a prominent dorsal spine on the dorsoposterior end of the cephalothoracic armor. The animal had small, possibly degenerate eyes that were flanked laterally by a small, crescent-shaped preorbital opening at the anterior end of the armor. The small eyes, in turn, laterally flank a small, slit-shaped mouth at the center of the anterior-most end of the cephalothorax.
