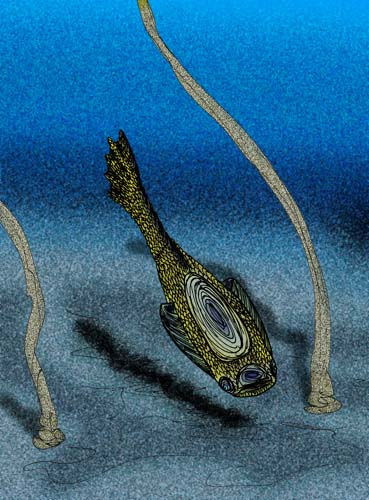
- Reconstruction of Weigeltaspis alta

Scientific classification
- Kingdom: Animalia
- Phylum: Chordata
- Infraphylum: Agnatha
- Class: †Pteraspidomorpha
- Subclass: †Heterostraci
- Order: †Traquairaspidiformes
- Family: †Weigeltaspididae; Berg, 1940
- Genus: †Weigeltaspis; Brotzen, 1933

Type species
- Weigeltaspis alta Brotzen, 1933

Species
- Weigeltaspis alta Brotzen, 1933; Weigeltaspis brotzeni Tarlo, 1964; Weigeltaspis godmani Tarlo, 1964; Weigeltaspis heintzi Tarlo, 1964

= Weigeltaspis =

Weigeltaspis Temporal range: Late Silurian–Early Devonian

Extinct genus of jawless fishes

Weigeltaspis is a genus of extinct heterostracan agnathan fish known from the Late Silurian and Early Devonian periods. Fossils are known primarily from Early Devonian-aged marine strata of Europe and Canada. Fragments and disarticulated plates of what may be of Weigeltaspis are known from Late Silurian-aged marine strata of Arctic Canada. Rare articulated fossils, plus the overall anatomy of its plates suggest the living animals were, at least superficially, similar to psammosteids, some authorities, such as Tarlo, place them within Psammosteida. Because the ornamentation on the plates and scales are very similar to the ornamentation seen on the plates and scales of Traquairaspis to the point of constant confusion, other authorities follow the lead of Obruchev, and place Weigeltaspis within Traquairaspidiformes. Still other authorities remain unconvinced of either side, and, instead, follow Denison's lead to simply treat Weigeltaspis as incertae sedis.
