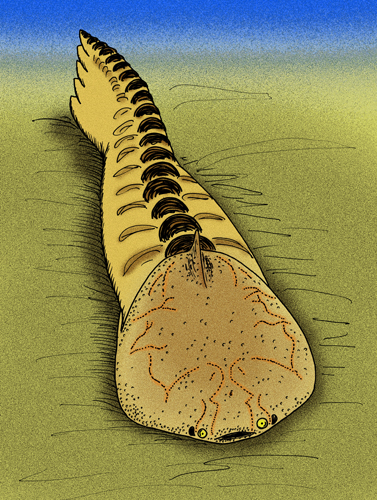
- Amphiaspis argo reconstruction

Scientific classification
- Kingdom: Animalia
- Phylum: Chordata
- Infraphylum: Agnatha
- Class: †Pteraspidomorpha
- Subclass: †Heterostraci
- Order: †Cyathaspidiformes
- Superfamily: †Amphiaspidoidei
- Family: †Amphiaspididae; Obruchev, 1936

Genera
- Amphiaspis; Amphoraspis

= Amphiaspididae =

Amphiaspidae Temporal range: Early Devonian

Extinct family of jawless fishes

Amphiaspididae is a family of extinct amphiaspidid heterostracan agnathans whose fossils are restricted to Lower Devonian marine strata of Siberia near the Taimyr Peninsula. In life, the amphiaspidids of Amphiaspididae are thought to be benthic animals that lived most of their lives mostly buried in the sediment of a series of hypersaline lagoons. Amphiaspids are easily distinguished from other heterostracans in that all of the plates of the cephalothorax armor are fused into a single, muff-like unit, so that the forebody of the living animal would have looked like a potpie with a pair of small, or degenerated eyes, with each flanked by a preorbital opening, and a simple, slit-like mouth.

== Taxonomy ==
=== Amphiaspis ===
Amphiaspis argo is the type species of Amphiaspidida, and is known from an incomplete set of pillow-shaped cephalothoracic armor. The armor also appears to have a pattern of lateral sensory line canals.

=== Amphoraspis ===
Amphoraspis stellata has a broad, rounded armor that looks vaguely like a pot or vase.
