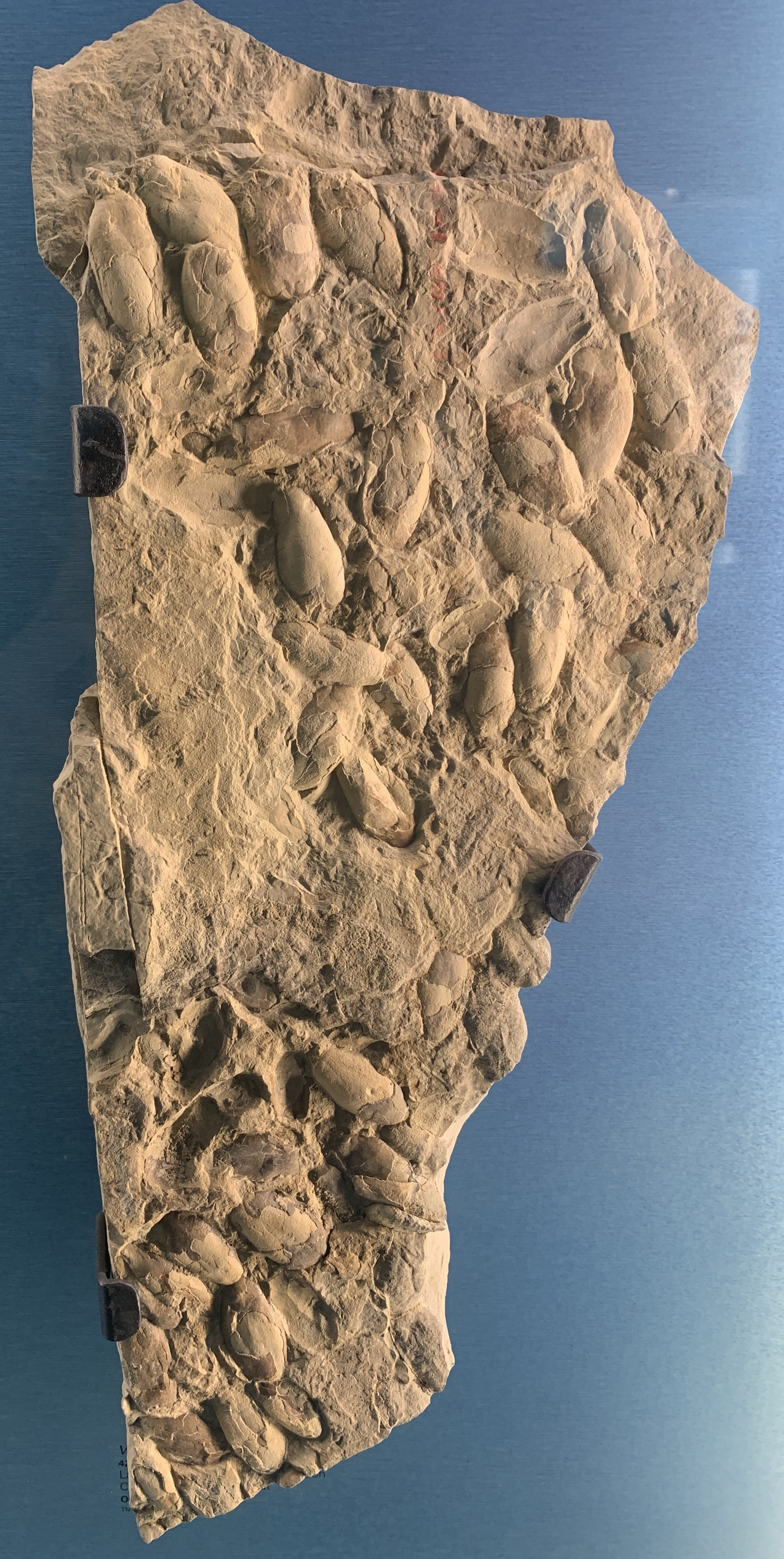
- Vernonaspis sp. mass mortality. Late Silurian, Cape Storm Formation, Cornwallis Island, Nunavut (Canada)

Scientific classification
- Kingdom: Animalia
- Phylum: Chordata
- Infraphylum: Agnatha
- Class: †Pteraspidomorpha
- Subclass: †Heterostraci
- Order: †Cyathaspidiformes
- Family: †Cyathaspididae
- Genus: †Vernonaspis; Flower and Wayland-Smith, 1952

Type species
- Veronaspis allenae Flower and Wayland-Smith, 1952

Other species
- V. leonardi Flower and Wayland-Smith, 1952; V. bamberi Denison et al., 1963; V. major Denison et al., 1963; V. vaningeni Denison, 1964; V. epitegosa Broad and Lenz, 1972; V. parryi Thorsteinsson and Elliott, 2022; V. suffusca Thorsteinsson and Elliott, 2022; V. magna Thorsteinsson and Elliott, 2022

= Vernonaspis =

Vernonaspis Temporal range: Upper Silurian

Genus of fossil chordates

Vernonaspis is an extinct genus of jawless fish that lived in the Silurian in the Paleozoic approximately 419 million years ago, in what is now Canada and the Northeastern United States.
