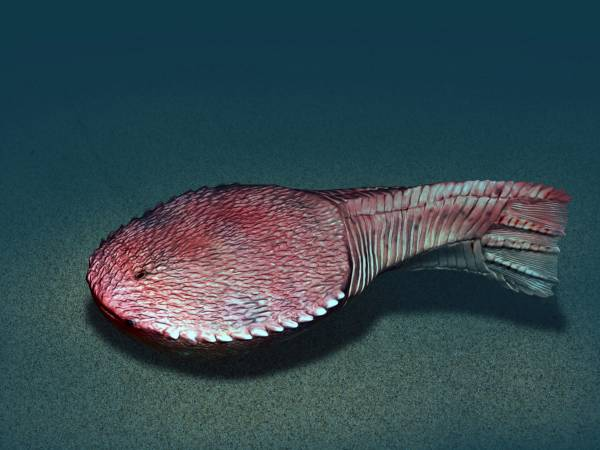
- Life reconstruction of Ctenaspis dentata

Scientific classification
- Kingdom: Animalia
- Phylum: Chordata
- Infraphylum: Agnatha
- Class: †Pteraspidomorpha
- Subclass: †Heterostraci
- Order: †Cyathaspidiformes
- Clade: †Cyathaspidida
- Family: †Ctenaspidae

Genera
- See text

= Ctenaspidae =

Family of jawless fishes

Ctenaspidae is a family of extinct cyathaspidiform heterostracan agnathans in the suborder Cyathaspidida.

If Amphiaspidida can be ignored as a daughter-taxon, the family Ctenaspidae contains Ctenaspis and its various sister-taxa originally contained within both Ctenaspididae and Ctenaspididae, including Allocryptaspis, Alainaspis, Zaphoctenaspis, Arctictenaspis, and Boothiaspis, which was first described as a "Canadian amphiaspid."
