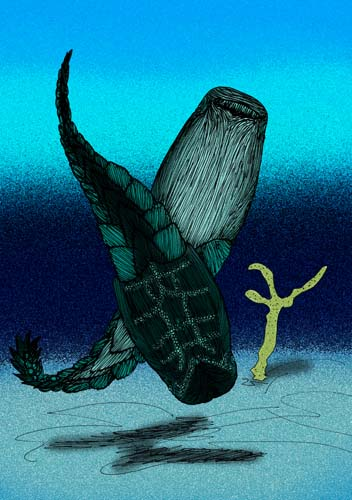

Scientific classification
- Kingdom: Animalia
- Phylum: Chordata
- Infraphylum: Agnatha
- Class: †Pteraspidomorpha
- Subclass: †Heterostraci
- Order: †Cyathaspidiformes
- Family: †Ariaspidae
- Genus: †Liliaspis
- Species: †L. philippovae

Binomial name
- †Liliaspis philippovae Novitskaya, 1973

= Liliaspis =

Liliaspis Temporal range: Lochkovian

Extinct genus of jawless fishes

Liliaspis philippovae is an extinct cyathaspidiform heterostracan agnathan from early Devonian marine strata of the Ural Mountains.

Liliaspis was, at various times, placed in the families Cyathaspididae, Poraspididae, and Anglaspididae. Currently, it is placed in Ariaspidae with Ariaspis, and Listraspis, and is considered to be closely related to the similar-looking Paraliliaspis. Anglaspis is considered the ancestor or sister-taxon of both L. philippovae and Paraliliaspis.
