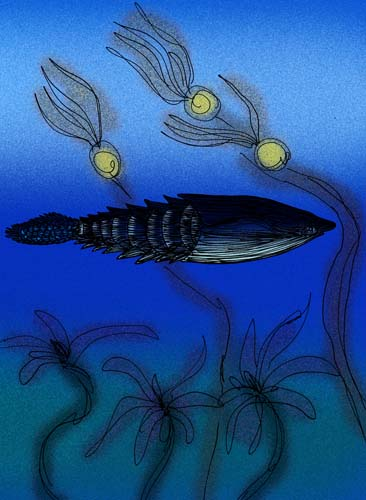
- Artist's reconstruction of Anglaspis macculloughi

Scientific classification
- Kingdom: Animalia
- Phylum: Chordata
- Infraphylum: Agnatha
- Class: †Pteraspidomorpha
- Subclass: †Heterostraci
- Order: †Cyathaspidiformes
- Clade: †Cyathaspidida
- Family: †Ariaspidae

Genera
- See text

= Ariaspidae =

Family of jawless fishes

Ariaspidae is a family of extinct cyathaspidiform heterostracan agnathans in the suborder Cyathaspidida.

Family Ariaspidae contains Ariaspis, and its sister-taxa originally contained within Anglaspididae/Anglaspidinae, including Anglaspis, Listraspis, Liliaspis, and Paraliliaspis.
