= Edaphaspis =

Edaphaspis Temporal range: Early Devonian

Scientific classification
- Kingdom: Animalia
- Phylum: Chordata
- Infraphylum: Agnatha
- Class: †Pteraspidomorpha
- Subclass: †Heterostraci
- Order: †Cyathaspidiformes
- Clade: †Amphiaspidida
- Superfamily: †Amphiaspidoidei
- Family: †Edaphaspididae; Novitskaya, 1971
- Genus: †Edaphaspis; Novitskaya, 1968
- Species: †E. bystrowi

Binomial name
- †Edaphaspis bystrowi Novitskaya, 1968

Extinct genus of jawless fishes

Edaphaspis bystrowi is an extinct amphiaspidid cyathaspidid heterostracan. Its fossils are restricted to early Devonian-aged marine strata of the Taimyr Peninsula, Early Devonian Siberia. E. bystrowi, as with all other amphiaspidids, is thought to have been a benthic filter feeder that lived on top of, or buried just below the surface of the substrate of hypersaline lagoon-bottoms. It is the only representative of the genus Edaphaspis and family Edaphaspididae.

== Anatomy ==
Edaphaspis bystrowi is known from a mostly complete cephalothoracic armor that is 16 centimeters long, and 21 centimeters wide. The armor is laterally flanked on both sides by serrated fringes. The anterior portion of the armor is missing, so experts are unsure if E. bystrowi had eyes (and preorbital openings) or not. There is a pair of branchial openings placed dorsally on a large dorsal lump at the posterior end of the armor.
