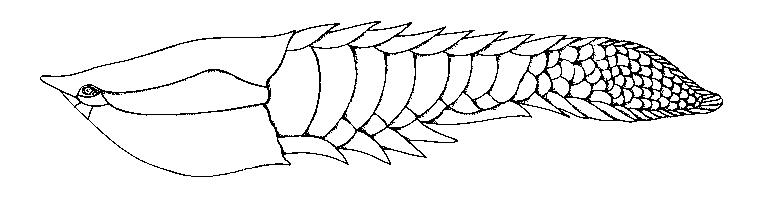

Scientific classification
- Kingdom: Animalia
- Phylum: Chordata
- Infraphylum: Agnatha
- Class: †Pteraspidomorpha
- Subclass: †Heterostraci
- Order: †Cyathaspidiformes
- Family: †Cyathaspididae
- Genus: †Poraspis; Kiær, 1930

= Poraspis =

Poraspis Temporal range: Late Silurian–Lower Devonian

Extinct genus of jawless fishes

Poraspis is an extinct genus of heterostracan. Fossils are found in Late Silurian and Early Devonian marine strata of Norway, Canada and the United States.
