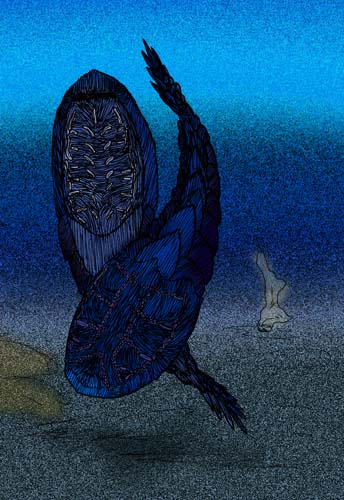

Scientific classification
- Kingdom: Animalia
- Phylum: Chordata
- Infraphylum: Agnatha
- Class: †Pteraspidomorpha
- Subclass: †Heterostraci
- Order: †Cyathaspidiformes
- Family: †Ariaspidae
- Genus: †Paraliliaspis
- Species: †P. egregia

Binomial name
- †Paraliliaspis egregia Novitskaya, 1994

= Paraliliaspis =

Paraliliaspis Temporal range: Early Devonian

Extinct genus of jawless fishes

Paraliliaspis egregia is an extinct cyathaspidiform heterostracan agnathan from early Devonian marine strata of the Ural Mountains. Paraliliaspis fossils have also been found in eastern Poland.

Paraliliaspis was, at various times, placed in the families Cyathaspididae, and Anglaspididae. Currently, it is placed in Ariaspidae with Ariaspis, and Listraspis, and is considered to be closely related to the similar-looking Liliaspis, which is also from Early Devonian Ural marine strata. Anglaspis is considered the ancestor or sister-taxon of both Liliaspis and P. egregia.
