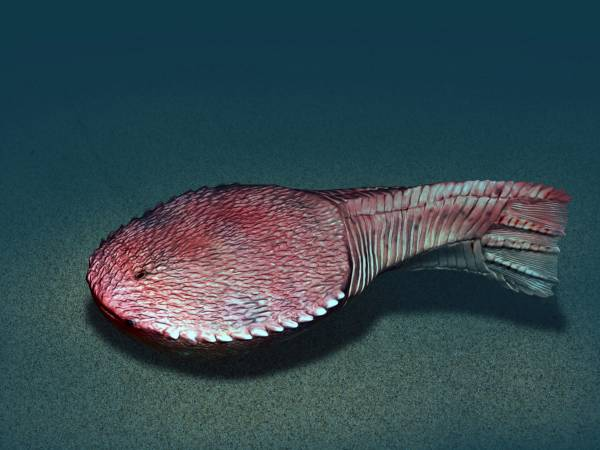
- C. dentata

Scientific classification
- Kingdom: Animalia
- Phylum: Chordata
- Infraphylum: Agnatha
- Class: †Pteraspidomorpha
- Subclass: †Heterostraci
- Order: †Cyathaspidiformes
- Family: †Ctenaspidae
- Genus: †Ctenaspis; Zych, 1931

= Ctenaspis =

Ctenaspis Temporal range: Early Devonian 416.0-412.3 mya

Extinct genus of jawless fishes

Ctenaspis (Ctenaspis kaieri) is an extinct genus of heterostracan cyathaspid agnathans from the early Devonian of Canada, Norway and Russia 416.0 to 412.3 million years ago. Species of Ctenaspis are typically 10 to 18 cm long with the max length being 40 cm long. The genus contains only one known species, namely Ctenaspis kaieri.

C. kaieri has no adorbital opening and only two dorsal and ventral plates . The dorsal plate is fused with branchials and the plates notably thin. C. kiaeri has its branchial openings located at the posterior edge of armour. The dorsal shield is flat.

== Sources ==
- Vertebrate Fossils and the Evolution of Scientific Concepts by W. Sargeant
- BioLib.cz
