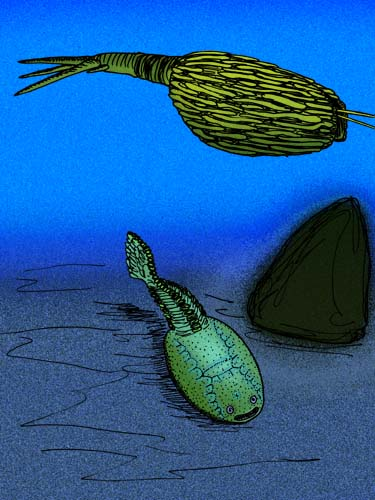
- Comparison of Kiangsuaspis nakingaspis and Xiushuiaspis

Scientific classification
- Kingdom: Animalia
- Phylum: Arthropoda
- Subphylum: Crustacea
- Class: Malacostraca
- Order: Archaeostraca
- Suborder: Ceratiocaridina
- Family: Ceratiocarididae
- Genus: Kiangsuaspis P'an, 1962

Binomial name
- Kiangsuaspis nankingensis P'an, 1962

= Kiangsuaspis =

Kiangsuaspis Temporal range: Late Silurian

Extinct genus of crustaceans

Kiangsuaspis nankingensis is an extinct phyllocarid crustaceans from Late Silurian China. It was originally described in 1962 by Kiang P'an as an incomplete ventral plate of a cyathaspidid heterostracan agnathan with a unique pattern of raised, sculptured tubercles that fuse together into anastomosing ridges. In 1984, Jiang P'an then reappraised it as a ceratiocaridid crustacean.
