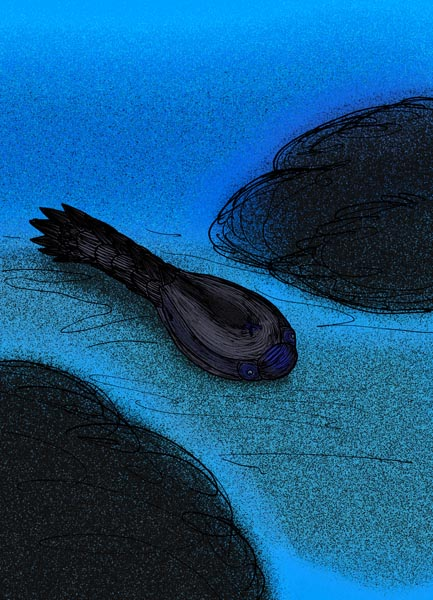
- Reconstruction of Cyathaspis banksii

Scientific classification
- Domain: Eukaryota
- Kingdom: Animalia
- Phylum: Chordata
- Subphylum: Vertebrata
- Infraphylum: Agnatha
- Class: †Pteraspidomorpha
- Subclass: †Heterostraci
- Order: †Cyathaspidiformes
- Clade: †Cyathaspidida
- Family: †Cyathaspididae; Romer, 1945

Type genus
- †Cyathaspis Lankester

Subfamilies
- Ctenaspinae; Cyathaspidinae; Poraspinae

Synonyms
- Cyathaspidei Kiaer

= Cyathaspididae =

Extinct family of jawless fishes

Cyathaspididae is an extinct family in the heterostracan order Cyathaspidiformes.

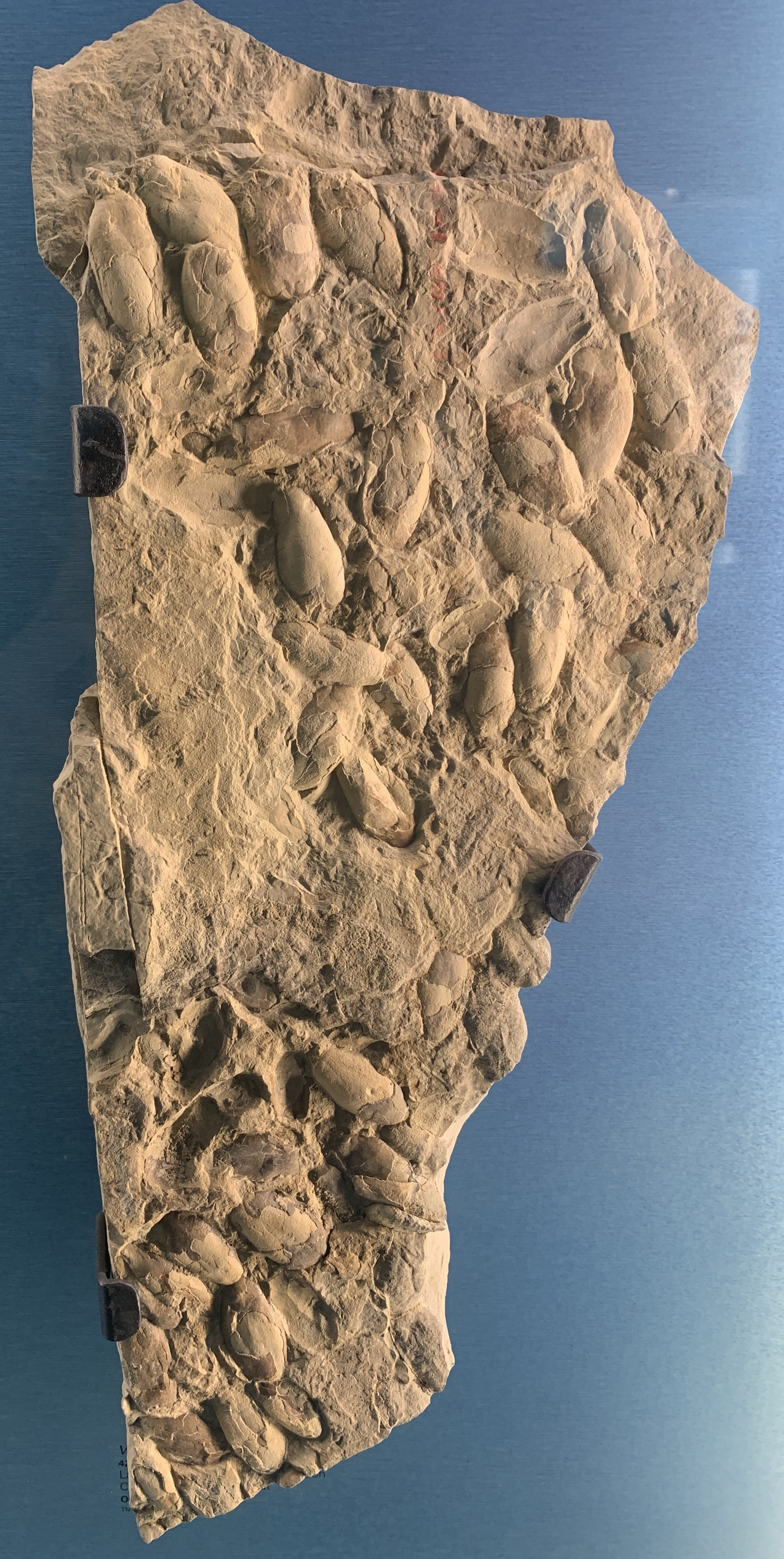
Vernonaspis sp. mass mortality. Late Silurian, Cape Storm Formation, Cornwallis Island, Nunavut (Canada).

Cyathaspididae contains most of the genera originally contained within Cyathaspididae, as well as those genera contained within Irregularaspididae, and Poraspididae. In addition to the type genus, †Cyathaspis, Cyathaspididae contains the following genera: †Americaspis, †Archegonaspis, †Capitaspis, †Dikenaspis, †Dinaspidella, †Homaspidella, †Irregulareaspis, †Nahanniaspis, †Pionaspis, †Poraspis, †Ptomaspis, †Seretaspis, †Steinaspis, †Torpedaspis and †Vernonaspis.

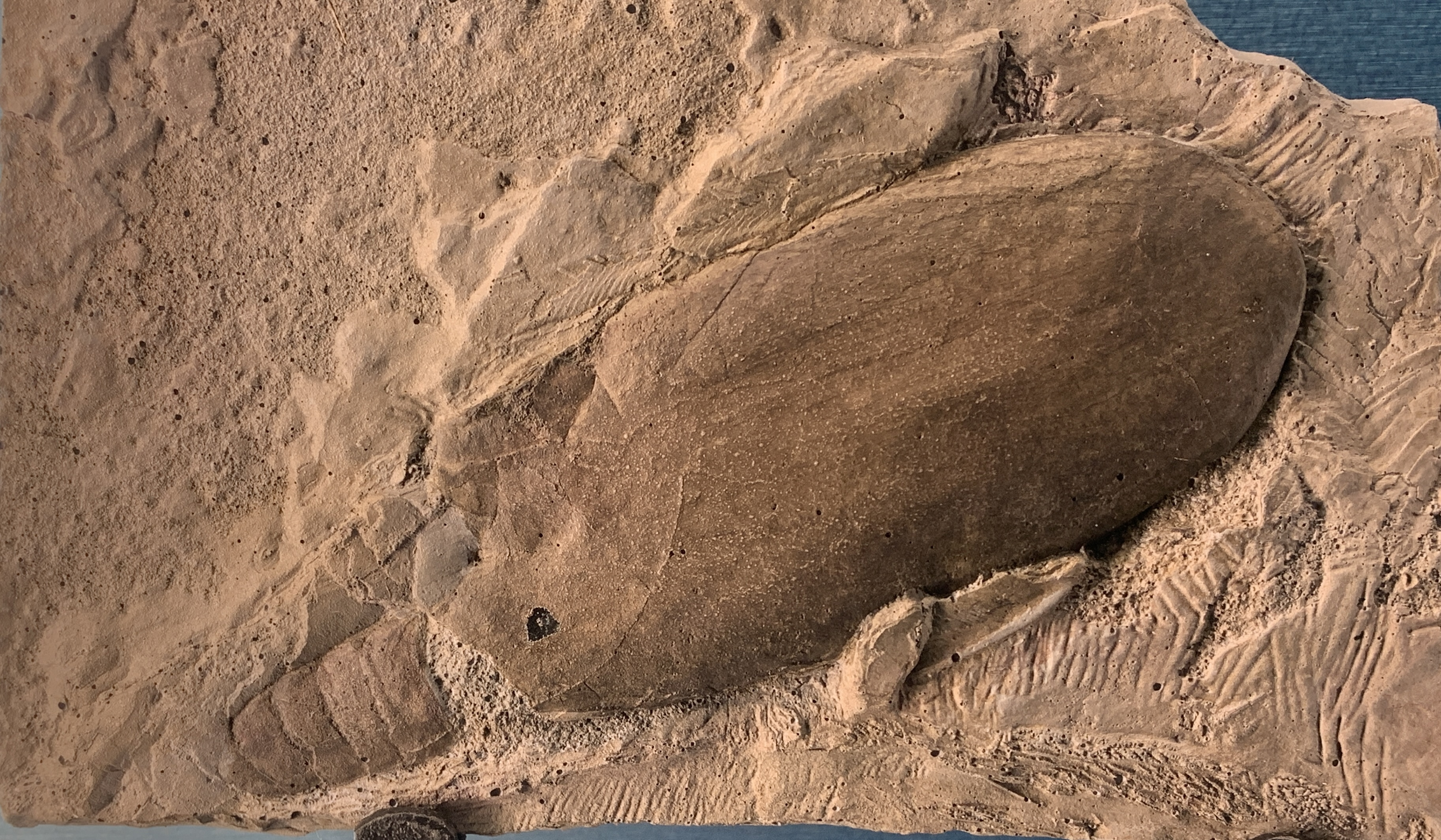
Pionaspis amplissima cast. Early Devonian, Mackenzie Mountains, Northwest Territories (Canada).
