= Alainaspis =

Alainaspis platyrhina Temporal range: Upper Silurian

Scientific classification
- Kingdom: Animalia
- Phylum: Chordata
- Infraphylum: Agnatha
- Class: †Pteraspidomorpha
- Subclass: †Heterostraci
- Order: †Cyathaspidiformes
- Family: †Ctenaspidae
- Genus: †Alainaspis; Elliott & Dineley, 1985
- Species: †A. platyrhina

Binomial name
- †Alainaspis platyrhina Elliott & Dineley, 1985

Extinct genus of jawless fishes

Alainaspis platyrhina is an extinct cyathaspidid heterostracan agnathan vertebrate which existed in a marine environment in what is now the Northwest Territories of Canada, during the upper Silurian period. It was first named by David Elliott and David Dineley in 1985, and is placed in the monotypic genus Alainaspis, closely related to Boothiaspis.
