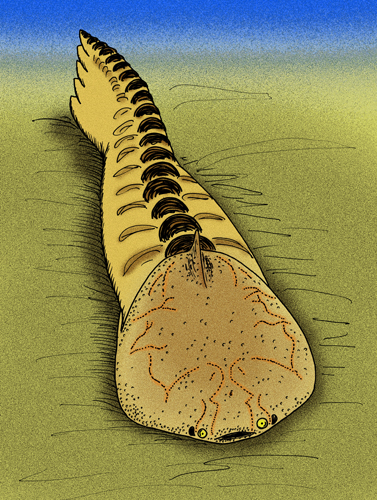
- Reconstruction of Amphiaspis argo
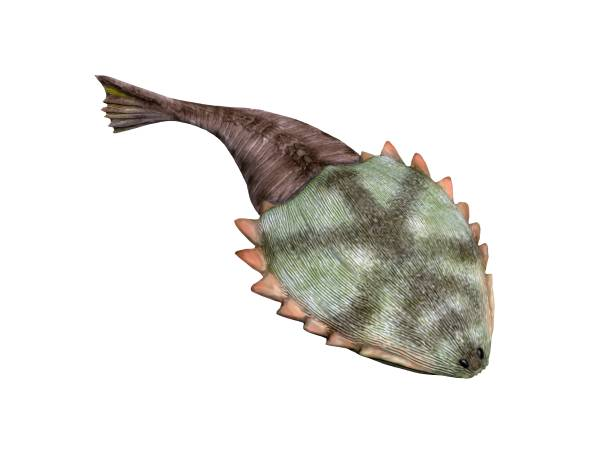
- Reconstruction of Hibernaspis

Scientific classification
- Kingdom: Animalia
- Phylum: Chordata
- Infraphylum: Agnatha
- Class: †Pteraspidomorpha
- Subclass: †Heterostraci
- Order: †Amphiaspidiformes

Suborders and families
- Amphiaspidoidei; Amphiaspididae; Edaphaspididae; Gabreyaspididae; Olbiaspididae; Hibernaspidoidei; Aphataspididae; Eglonaspididae; Hibernaspididae; Siberiaspidoidei; Siberiaspididae; Tuxeraspididae

Synonyms
- Amphiaspidida

= Amphiaspidiformes =

Amphiaspidiformes Temporal range: Early Devonian (Early Lochkovian)

Extinct group of jawless fishes

Amphiaspidiformes, or Amphiaspidida, is a taxon of extinct heterostracan agnathans whose fossils are restricted to Lower Devonian marine strata of Siberia near the Taimyr Peninsula. Some authorities treat it as a suborder of Cyathaspidiformes, while others treat it as an order in its own right.

In life, they are thought to be benthic animals that lived most of their lives mostly buried in the sediment of a series of hypersaline lagoons. Amphiaspids are easily distinguished from other heterostracans in that all of the plates of the cephalothorax armor are fused into a single, muff-like unit, so that the forebody of the living animal would have looked like a potpie or a hot waterbottle with a pair of small, or degenerated eyes sometimes flanked by preorbital openings, a pair of branchial openings for exhaling, and a simple, slit-like, or tube-like mouth.

== Taxonomy ==
Amphiaspidiformes is traditionally regarded as the sister-taxon or daughter-taxon of the cyathaspidid family Ctenaspidae (ne "Ctenaspididae"), though no formal shared traits are identified between the two groups. The ctenaspidid cyathaspid, Boothiaspis, of Lower Devonian Canada, was initially described as an amphiaspid.

As mentioned earlier, Amphiaspidiformes is treated as either a suborder of Cyathaspidiformes, or as an order in its own right, sometimes referred to as "Amphiaspidiformes." Regardless of its own status, Amphiaspidiformes is divided into three superfamilies, Amphiaspidoidei, Hibernaspidoidei, and Siberiaspidoidei. An additional species, Gunaspis orientalis, was listed as an amphiaspid by Novitskaya 2008, although, because it is only known from a fragment with distinctive armor micro-ornamentation, it's assignment is questionable.

Tuxeraspis and Litotaspis are known primarily from fragments and portions of the head-region, while Dotaspis is known from a mostly intact headshield.

In Novitskaya & Afanassieva (2004), Novitskaya recognized most of the following taxonomic organization of the group, with the questionable addition and placement of Gunaspis following Novitskaya (2008):

Order Amphiaspidiformes

- Suborder Amphiaspidoidei
  - Family Amphiaspididae Obruchev, 1939
    - Genus Amphiaspis Obruchev, 1939
    - Genus Amphoraspis Novitskaya & Karatajute-Talimaa, 1989
  - Family Edaphaspididae Novitskaya, 1968
    - Genus Edaphaspis Novitskaya, 1968
  - Family Gabreyaspididae Novitskaya, 1968
    - Genus Gabreyaspis Novitskaya, 1968
    - Genus Pelaspis Novitskaya, 1971
    - Genus Prosarctaspis Novitskaya, 1968
    - Genus Tareyaspis Novitskaya, 1968
  - Family Olbiaspididae Obruchev, 1964
    - Genus Angaraspis Obruchev, 1964
    - Genus Kureykaspis Novitskaya, 1968
    - Genus Olbiaspis Obruchev, 1964
- Suborder Hibernaspidoidei
  - Family Aphataspididae Novitskaya, 1971
    - Genus Aphataspis Obruchev, 1964
    - Genus Putoranaspis Obruchev, 1964
  - Family Eglonaspididae Tarlo, 1962
    - Genus Eglonaspis Obruchev, 1959
    - Genus Empedaspis Novitskaya, 1971
    - Genus Gerronaspis Novitskaya, 1971
    - Genus Lecaniaspis Novitskaya, 1971
    - Genus Pelurgaspis Obruchev, 1964
  - Family Hibernaspididae Obruchev, 1939
    - Genus Hibernaspis Obruchev, 1939
- Suborder Siberiaspidoidei
  - Family Siberiaspididae Novitskaya, 1968
    - Genus Argyriaspis Novitskaya, 1971
    - Genus Siberiaspis Obruchev, 1964
  - Family Tuxeraspididae Novitskaya, 1971
    - Genus Dotaspis Novitskaya et Herman, 1983
    - Genus Litotaspis Novitskaya, 1971
    - Genus Tuxeraspis Novitskaya, 1971
- Genus ?Gunaspis Bystrow, 1959
