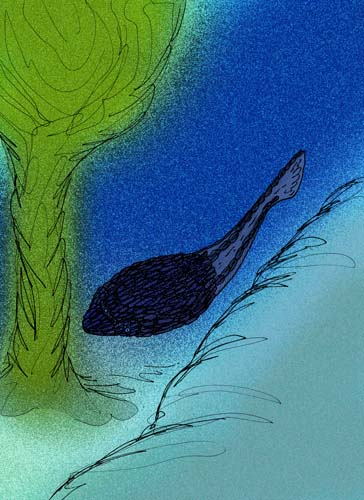
- Reconstruction of T. cambelli

Scientific classification
- Kingdom: Animalia
- Phylum: Chordata
- Infraphylum: Agnatha
- Class: †Pteraspidomorpha
- Subclass: †Heterostraci
- Order: †Traquairaspidiformes; Tarlo, 1962

Families
- Phialaspididae; Traquairaspididae; ?Weigeltaspididae

Synonyms
- Traquairaspida Stensiö 1958; Phialaspidiformes Berg 1955

= Traquairaspidiformes =

Traquairaspidiformes Temporal range: Late Silurian–Early Devonian

Extinct order of jawless fishes

Traquairaspidiformes (or Traquairaspidida) is an order of extinct heterostracan agnathan fish known from the Silurian and Early Devonian periods. Fossils are predominantly known from Late Silurian fluvial deposits from Wales and England: some species were also found in strata representing shallow water marine environment in Canada and North America.

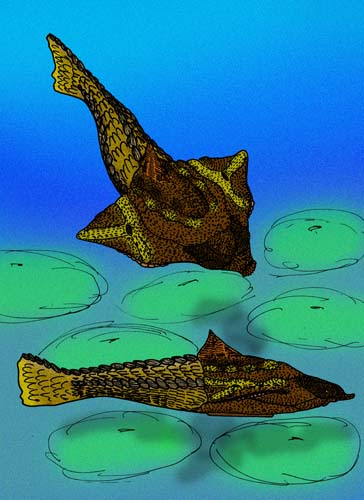
Phialaspis symmondsi

The head-shield and body armor of most traquairaspids form an almond shape. Plates have a distinctive ornamentation of tubercles: this ornamentation is very similar to the plate ornamentation of the heterostracan Weigeltaspis. This similarity of ornamentation creates much confusion over the taxonomical placement of Weigeltaspis, in addition to confusion over whether or not an isolated plate is of Traquairaspis, or of Weigeltaspis. Intact specimens of Weigeltaspis suggest a living animal similar to psammosteids like Drepanaspis. The armor of Phialaspis symmondsi (once considered as species of Traquairaspis) is shaped like a jet plane or paper airplane, with pointed wing-like crests and a dorsal crest near the posterior end of the armor. The body of "Yukonaspis," Traquairaspis angusta, is greatly elongated, based on the holotype, a ventral plate.

Most species of traquairaspids are placed within the type genus Traquairaspis; most of the other genera, such as Phialaspis, Toombsaspis, and "Yukonaspis," have been synonymized into Traquairaspis. Weigeltaspis is sometimes placed within Traquairaspidiformes on account of the plate ornamentation being almost identical to that of Traquairaspis.

== Taxonomy ==
- Family Phialaspididae White 1946
  - Genus Munchoaspis Tarrant 1991
  - Genus Phialaspis Wills 1935
  - Genus Toombsaspis Tarrant 1991
- Family Traquairaspididae Kiær 1932 corrig.
  - Genus Pseudotraquairaspis Broad 1968
  - Genus Rimasventeraspis Tarrant 1991 [Yukonaspis Obručhev 1964 non Kobayashi 1936 non Stensiö 1964]
  - Genus Traquairaspis Kiær 1932 [Orthaspis Brotzen 1934; Lophaspis Brotzen 1934 non Redtenbacher 1895; Lophaspiscis Whitley 1951]
- ?Family Weigeltaspididae Brotzen 1933/Tarlo 1962
  - ?Genus Weigeltaspis Brotzen 1933
