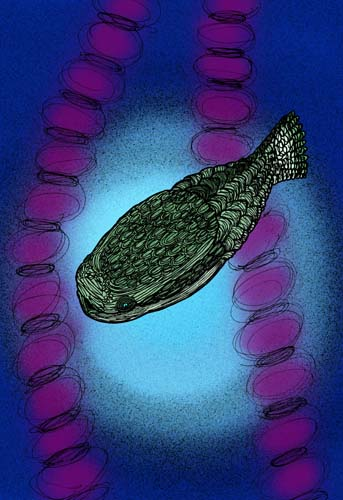
- The type species, Tolypelepis undulata

Scientific classification
- Domain: Eukaryota
- Kingdom: Animalia
- Phylum: Chordata
- Infraphylum: Agnatha
- Class: †Pteraspidomorpha
- Subclass: †Heterostraci
- Order: †Tolypelepidida; Denison 1964
- Family: †Tolypelepididae; Kiær 1932

Genera
- Asketaspis; Athenaegis; Tolypelepis

Synonyms
- Tolypelepidiformes

= Tolypelepidida =

Tolypelepidida Temporal range: Silurian - Early Devonian

Extinct order of jawless fishes

Tolypelepidida is an extinct order of heterostracan vertebrates. These armored jawless fish superficially resemble their relatives, the cyathaspids, though, researchers place the tolypelepids as a sister group to the cyathaspids and the pteraspidids (and both groups' daughter taxa). A recent study by Lundgren and Blom in 2013 implies that the order is paraphyletic, with the type genus, Tolypelepis, being the sister taxon of Cyathaspidiformes. The typical tolypelepid had a carapace formed from dorsal and ventral plates, and a scaly tail.

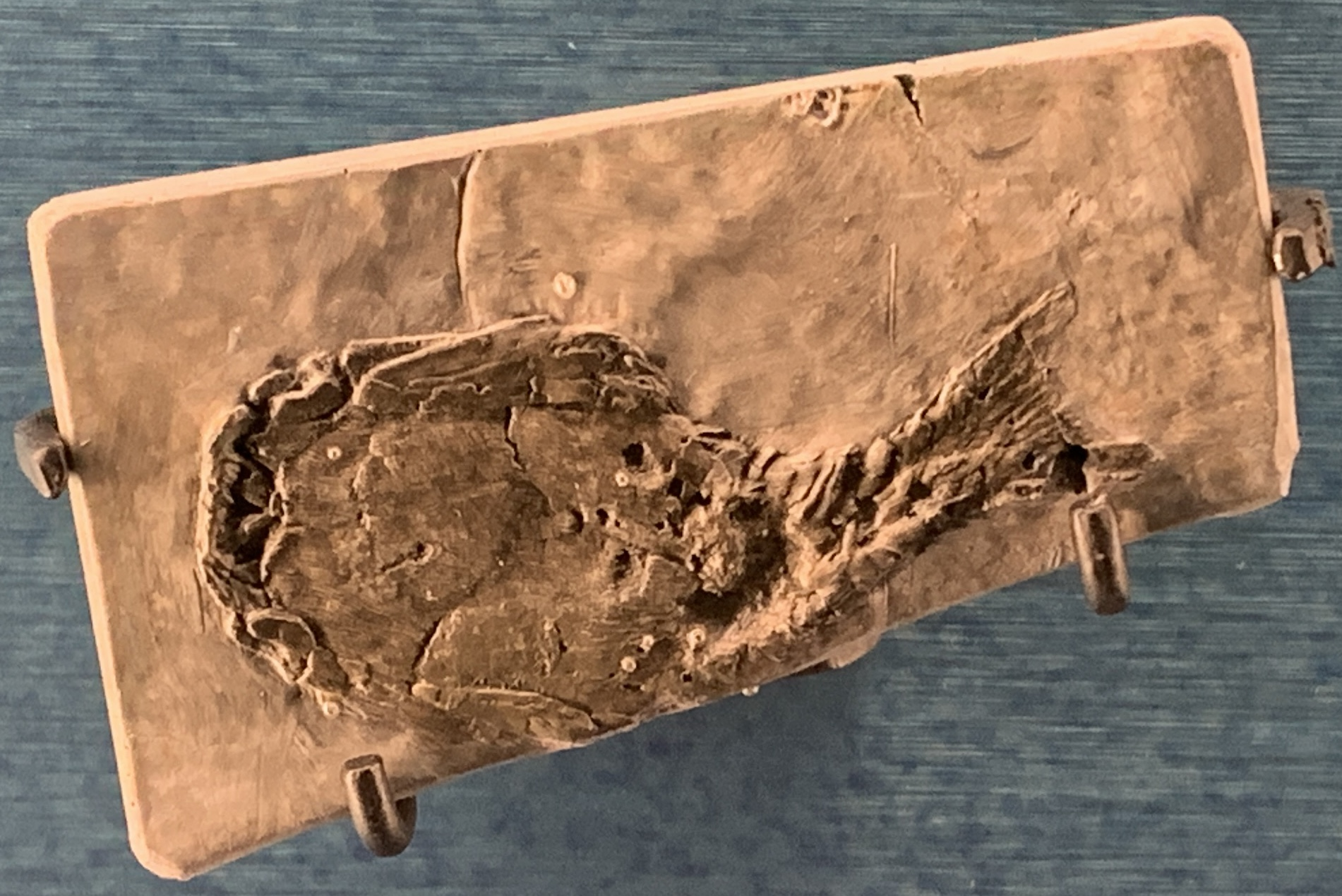
Athenaegis chattertoni cast, middle Silurian, Road River Formation, Mackenzie Mountains, Northwest Territories (Canada).

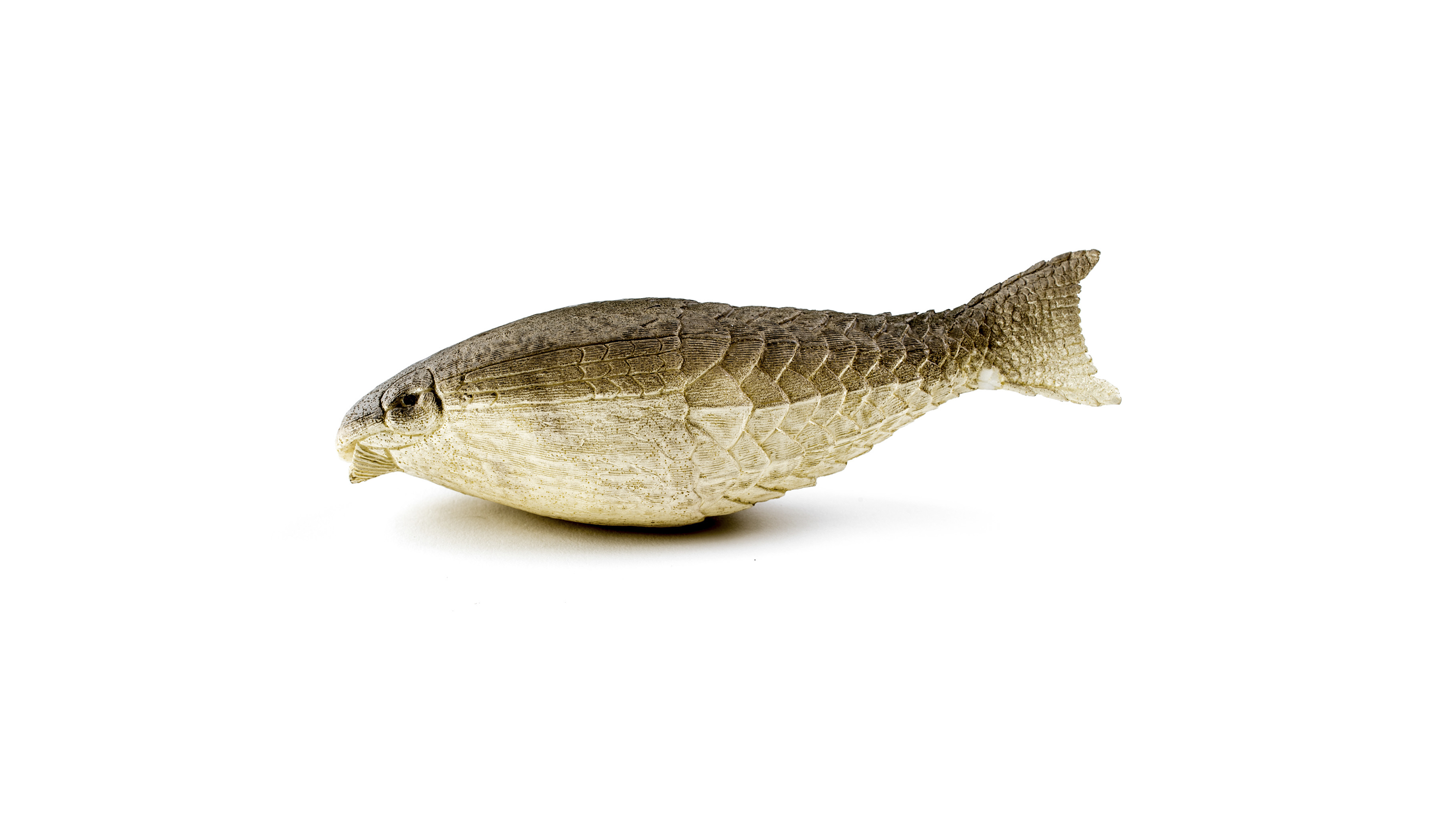
Athenaegis chattertoni reconstruction. At the Museo delle Scienze (MUSE).
