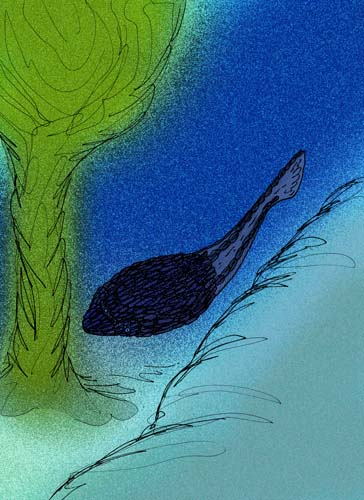
- Reconstruction of T. cambelli

Scientific classification
- Kingdom: Animalia
- Phylum: Chordata
- Infraphylum: Agnatha
- Class: †Pteraspidomorpha
- Subclass: †Heterostraci
- Order: †Traquairaspidiformes
- Family: †Traquairaspididae
- Genus: †Traquairaspis; Kiær 1932

Type species
- Traquairaspis campbelli (Traquair 1912) Kiær 1932

Species
- T. adunata Dineley & Loeffler 1976; T. broadi Dineley & Loeffler 1976; T. campbelli (Traquair 1912) Kiær 1932; T. guttata Dineley & Loeffler 1976; T. lemniscata Dineley & Loeffler 1976; T. mackenziensis Dineley & Loeffler 1976; T. plana (Brotzen 1934); T. poolei Dineley & Loeffler 1976; T. pustulata Dineley & Loeffler 1976; T. rambaldi Broad 1968; T. retusa Dineley & Loeffler 1976

Synonyms
- Orthaspis Brotzen 1934; Lophaspis Brotzen 1934 non Redtenbacher 1895; Lophaspiscis Whitley 1951

= Traquairaspis =

Traquairaspis Temporal range: Late Silurian–Early Devonian

Extinct genus of jawless fishes

Traquairaspis is a genus of extinct heterostracan agnathan fish known from the Silurian and Early Devonian periods. It is predominantly known from Late Silurian fluvial deposits from Wales and England: some species were also found in shallow water marine environment in Canada and North America.

The head-shield and body armor of most species form an almond shape. Plates have a distinctive ornamentation of tubercles: this ornamentation is very similar to the plate ornamentation of the heterostracan Weigeltaspis. This similarity of ornamentation creates much confusion over the taxonomical placement of Weigeltaspis, in addition to confusion over whether or not an isolated plate is of Traquairaspis, or of Weigeltaspis.

The generic name honors Ramsay Heatley Traquair.
