= Zych =

Zych is a Polish surname. Notable people with the surname include:

- Bogusław Zych (1951–1995), Polish fencer
- Gabriela Zych (1941–2010), Polish activist, victim of 2010 Polish Air Force Tu-154 crash
- Józef Zych (born 1938), Polish politician
- Kyle Zych (born 1996), American ice sled hockey player
- Maurycy Zych (1864–1925), Polish novelist and dramatist
- Michał Zych (born 1982), Polish ice dancer
- Oliwier Zych (born 2004), Polish footballer
- Tom Zych (1940–2023), American politician
- Tony Zych (born 1990), American baseball player
- Sylwester Zych (1950–1989), Polish Catholic priest
- Władysław Zych (1899–1981), Polish paleontologist and acting Delegate for the Soviet-occupied territories of Poland during World War II
