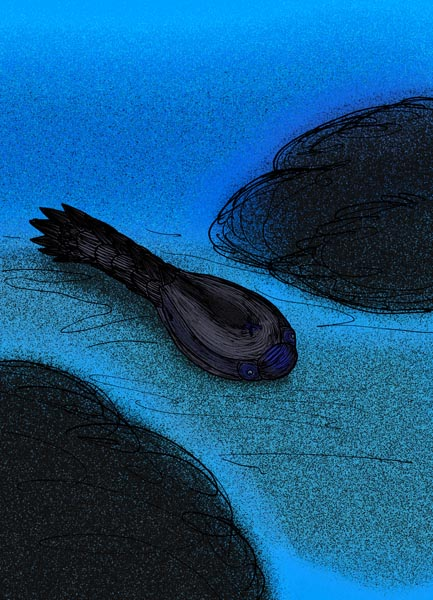
- Reconstruction of C. banksii

Scientific classification
- Kingdom: Animalia
- Phylum: Chordata
- Infraphylum: Agnatha
- Class: †Pteraspidomorpha
- Subclass: †Heterostraci
- Order: †Cyathaspidiformes
- Family: †Cyathaspididae
- Genus: †Cyathaspis; Lankester, 1865

Type species
- Pteraspis banksii Huxley and Salter, 1856

Species
- Cyathaspis acadica (Matthew 1886); Cyathaspis alexanderi Märss 2019; Cyathaspis banksii (Huxley & Salter 1856); Cyathaspis barroisi (Leriche 1906); Cyathaspis lindstromi Kiaer & Heintz 1935; Cyathaspis ludensis; Cyathaspis macculloughi (Woodward 1891)

= Cyathaspis =

Cyathaspis Temporal range: Wenlock to Pridoli, 432–419.6 Ma

Extinct genus of jawless fishes

Cyathaspis is the type genus of the heterostracan order Cyathaspidiformes. Fossils are found in late Silurian strata in the Cunningham Creek Formation, New Brunswick, Canada and Europe, especially in the Downton Castle Sandstone of Great Britain, Gotland, Sweden and Chelyabinsk oblast, Russia. The living animal would have looked superficially like a tadpole, albeit covered in bony plates composed of the tissue aspidine, which is unique to heterostracan armor.

Cyathaspis ludensis is the earliest British vertebrate fossil. It was found in rocks at Leintwardine in Herefordshire, a noted fossil locality.
