= Ariaspis =

Scientific classification
- Kingdom: Animalia
- Phylum: Chordata
- Infraphylum: Agnatha
- Class: †Pteraspidomorpha
- Subclass: †Heterostraci
- Order: †Cyathaspidiformes
- Family: †Ariaspidae
- Genus: †Ariaspis; Denison, 1963

Extinct genus of jawless fishes

Ariaspis is an extinct genus of cyathaspidiform heterostracan agnathan. Fossils are found in marine strata of Canada and Europe from the late Silurian period until its extinction during the Early Devonian. A new species, A. arctata, was described by David K. Elliott and Sandra Swift in 2010.
