= Muff (handwarmer) =

Fashion accessory for keeping the hands warm

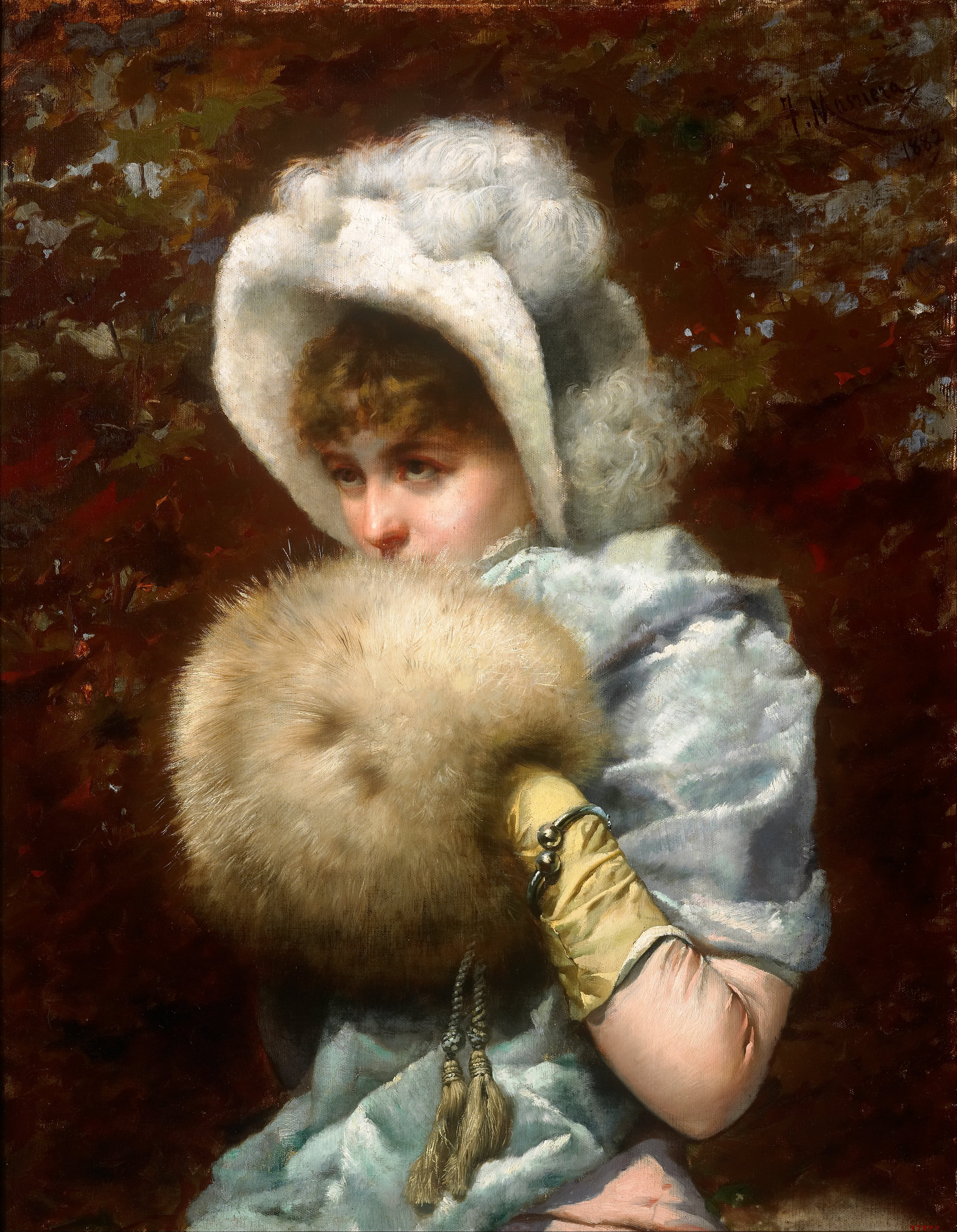
Winter 1882, by Francesc Masriera

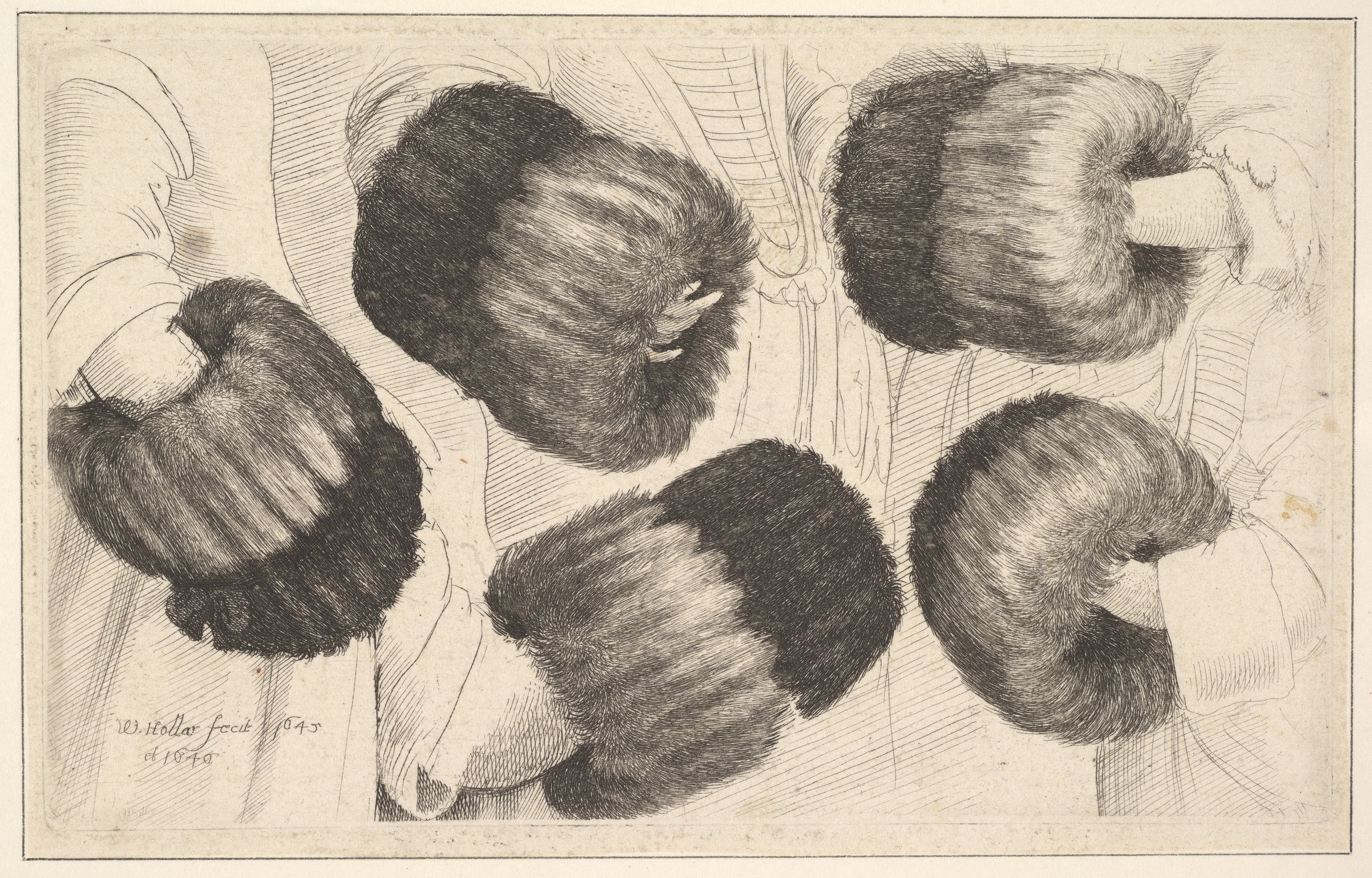
A muff in five views, 1645–46

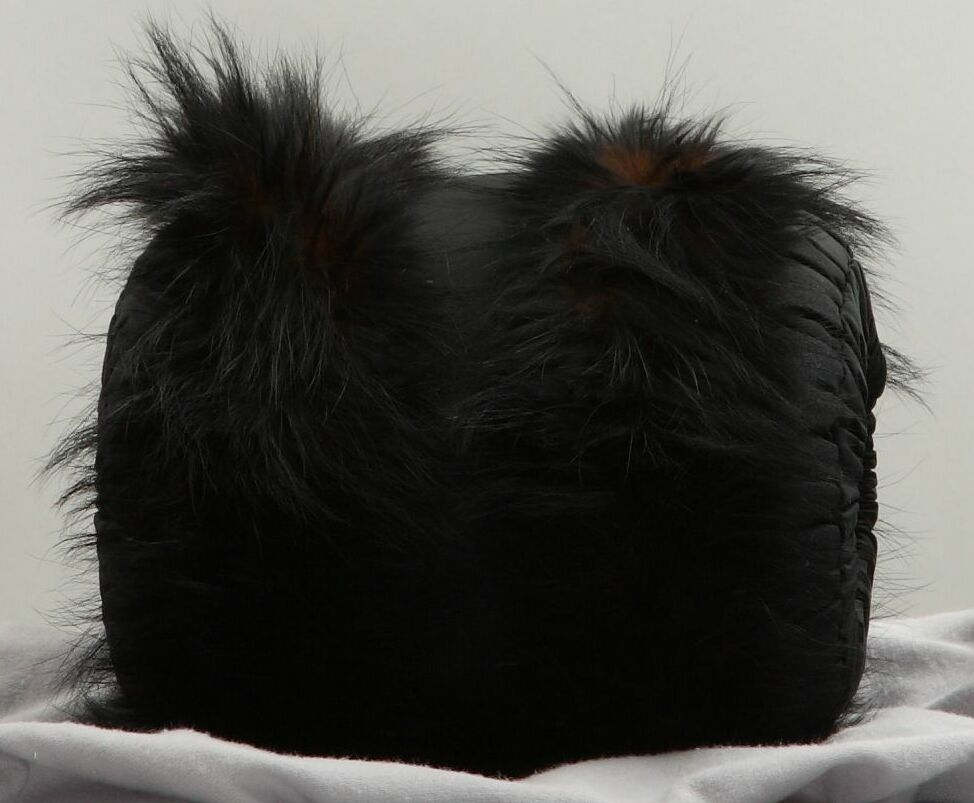
Black muff with fur trim

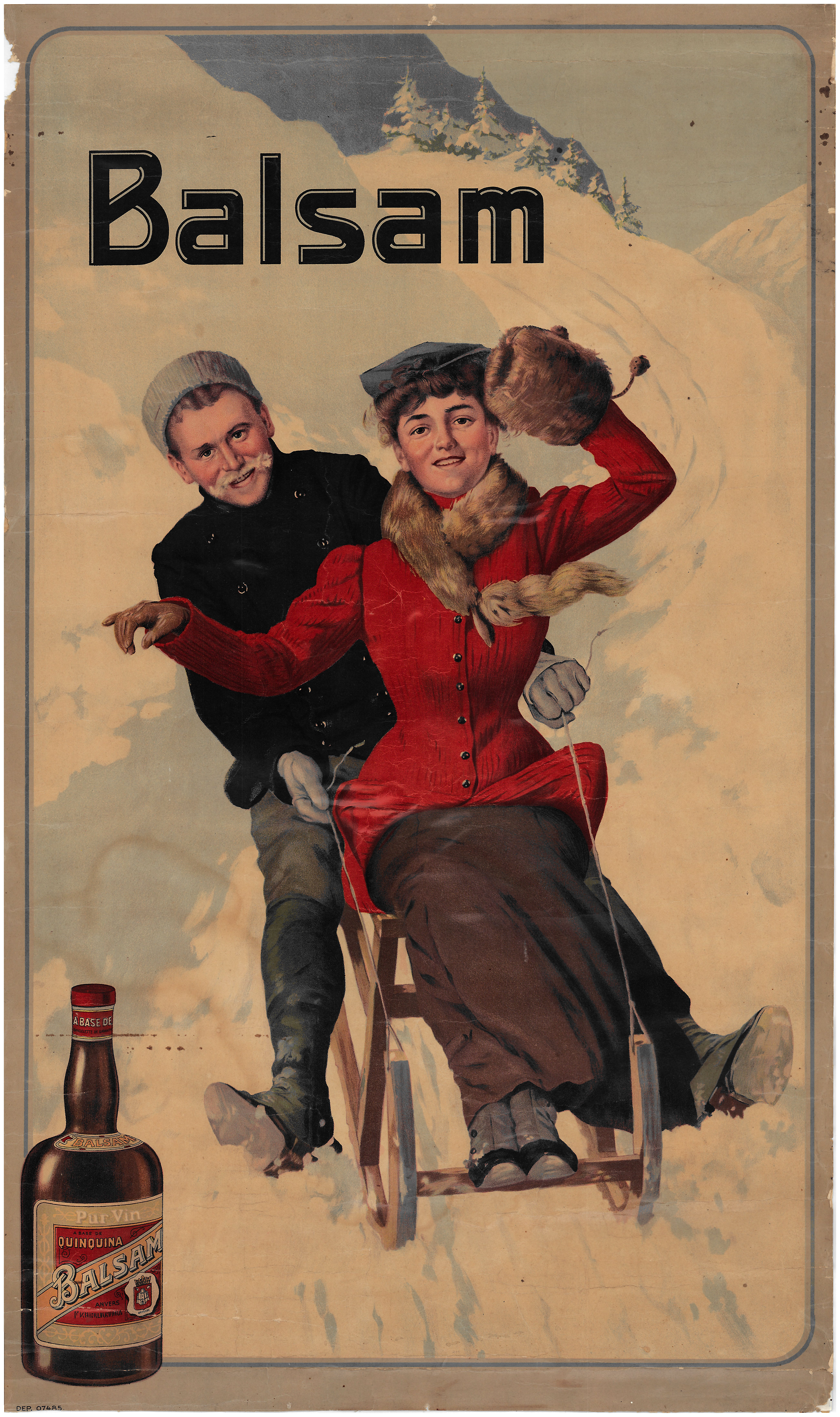
Poster 'Balsam' for distillery De Beukelaer, Antwerpen, ca. 1910, collection of Jenevermuseum Hasselt

A muff is a fashion accessory for outdoors usually made of a cylinder of fur or fabric with both ends open for keeping the hands warm. It was introduced to women's fashion in the 16th century and was popular with both men and women in the 17th and 18th centuries. By the early 19th century, muffs were used in Europe only by women.

It briefly returned in the mid-1940s, and in the 1960s was developed as a motorcycle accessory for attachment as rider-protection and comfort during the cooler months; integrated muff pockets came into use by the 1930s and remain common on casual jackets and hooded sweatshirts to this day.

== History ==
In Roman times, the place of the glove was taken by long sleeves (manicae) reaching to the hand, and in winter special sleeves of fur were worn. In Medieval Latin we find the word muffulae, defined by Du Cange as chirothecae pellitae et hibernae ("leather winter gloves"). He quotes from a cartulary of the year 817, of the issuing to monks of sheepskin coverings to be used during the winter. These may have been, as the Roman certainly were, separate coverings for each hand, although the cartulary cited also distinguishes the glove for summer from the muffulae for winter wear. The Old French moufle meant a thick glove or mitten, and from this the Dutch mof, Walloon mouffe, and thence English "muff", are probably derived.

In Elizabethan and Stuart England, the muff was sometimes called a "countenance" following a French usage. In 1579, Amias Paulet bought a fur "countenance" in Paris for Elizabeth I. Another type of Elizabethan muff was the fabric "snoskyn". Elizabeth I received a purple velvet snoskyn embroidered with leaves and flowers and set with seed pearls as a New Year's Day gift from Rebecca Seckford in 1603.

Woman wearing a muff in the early 20th century

== Modern usage ==
Handlebar muffs are a utility product for motorcycles and scooters to provide increased comfort in adverse weather conditions, to protect the rider from rain and wind chill. With UK commercial-availability in the early 1960s, they are still available in three variations from a UK merchandiser of motorcycle accessories, including dedicated-types for small motorscooters.

Traditionally made from waterproof faux leather and lined for insulation, more-modern, textile-based materials are also used.

When reviewing clothing and riding accessories in a 1966 feature entitled "Tough Weather Gear" for the weekly journal Motor Cycle, regular journalist John Ebbrell described the muffs as:

Ugly as sin they may be—but there's nothing more cosier to the fingertips than a pair of handlebar muffs...Material is waterproof plasticized fabric, lined. Fitted in a jiffy, the muffs are sold through Pride and Clarke's and cost 17s 6d.

Writing at his website in December 2010, American motorcycle design innovator Craig Vetter claimed to have "created and developed" from 1971 what he called Hippo Hands, later sold to the public from 1973 by the Vetter organisation. These were very similar to a product that was easily available to UK motorcyclists from retail shops/mail order outlets from 1957, with the description handlebar muffs.

== See also ==
Kangaroo pocket
