= Taymyr Peninsula =

Peninsula in the Far North of Russia

Таймырский полуостров
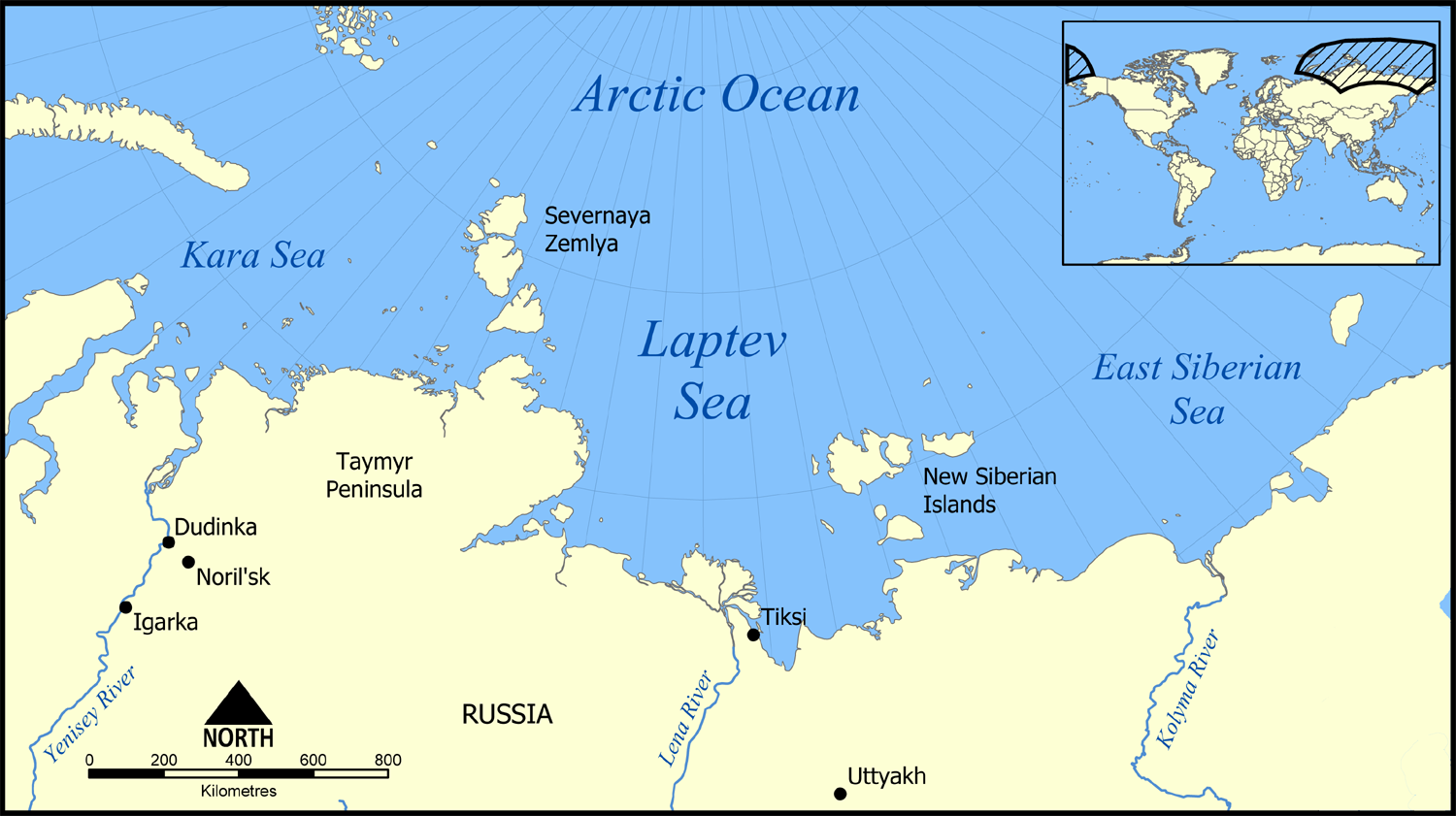
- Location of the Taymyr Peninsula.
- Interactive map of Taymyr Peninsula

Geography
- Location: Far North
- Coordinates: 74°N 98°E
- Adjacent to: Kara Sea; Laptev Sea
- Area: 400,000 km^{2} (150,000 sq mi)
- Length: 1,050 km (652 mi)
- Width: 520 km (323 mi)
- Highest elevation: 1,125 m (3691 ft)
- Highest point: Byrranga Mountains

Administration
- Russia
- Federal subject: Krasnoyarsk Krai

The Taymyr Peninsula (/taɪˈmɪər/ ty-MEER) (Note: Russian: Таймырский полуостров, romanized: Tajmyrskij poluostrov, IPA: [tɐjˈmɨrskʲɪj pəɫʊˈostrəf]) is a peninsula in the Far North of Russia, in the Siberian Federal District, that forms the northernmost part of the mainland of Eurasia. Administratively it is part of the Krasnoyarsk Krai Federal subject of Russia.

== Geography ==
The Taymyr Peninsula lies between the Yenisei Gulf of the Kara Sea and the Khatanga Gulf of the Laptev Sea.

Lake Taymyr and the Byrranga Mountains are located within the vast Taymyr Peninsula.

Cape Chelyuskin, the northernmost point of the Eurasian continent, is located at the northern end of the Taymyr Peninsula.

== Etymology ==
There are several theories about the origin of the name "Taimyr". The most widely accepted explanation is that it comes from the Evenki language, originating from the ancient Tungus word "tamura", which means "valuable, precious, rich". The Evenki people originally used this name for the Taimyr River, known for its abundance of fish. In the 19th century, thanks to the geographer and explorer Alexander von Middendorff (1815–1894), the name came to refer to the entire peninsula.

Other interpretations exist as well. For example, in Yakut, "tuoy muora" translates to "salt lake", which can also be understood metaphorically as "fertile" or "blessed", since salt is vital for the health of reindeer. Another Yakut version, "Tymyr", means "blood vessel".

In the Nenets language, "tai myarey" means "bald" or "bare", possibly in reference to the region’s low-growing tundra.

In the Nganasan language, "taa mire" translates to "reindeer pack".

== Population ==
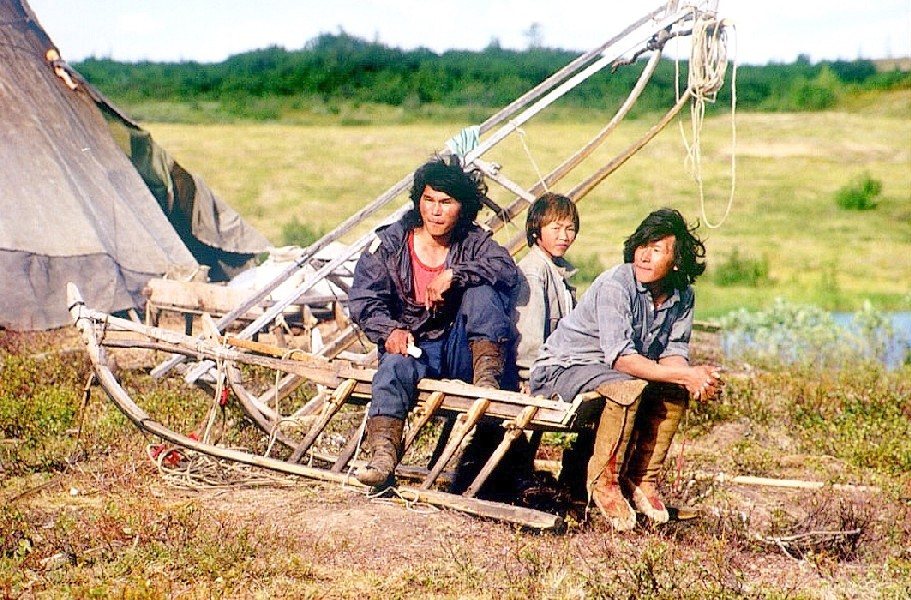
Indigenous Nenets people of Taymyr

Dolgans are the most populous indigenous ethnicity of the peninsula.

The Nganasan people are an indigenous Samoyedic people inhabiting central Siberia, including the Taymyr Peninsula. In the Russian Federation, they are recognized as being one of the Small-Numbered peoples of the Russian North. They reside primarily in the settlements of Ust-Avam, Volachanka, and Novaya in the Taymyrsky Dolgano-Nenetsky District of Krasnoyarsk Krai, with smaller populations residing in the towns of Dudinka and Norilsk as well.

Other indigenous peoples are Nenets, Enets and Evenks.

== Economy ==
MMC Norilsk Nickel conducts mining operations in the area. The company conducts smelting operations in the area of the city of Norilsk, near the peninsula. The nickel ore concentrate and other products of the company are transported over a short railroad to the port city of Dudinka on the Yenisei River, and from there by boat to Murmansk and other ports.

== Ecology ==
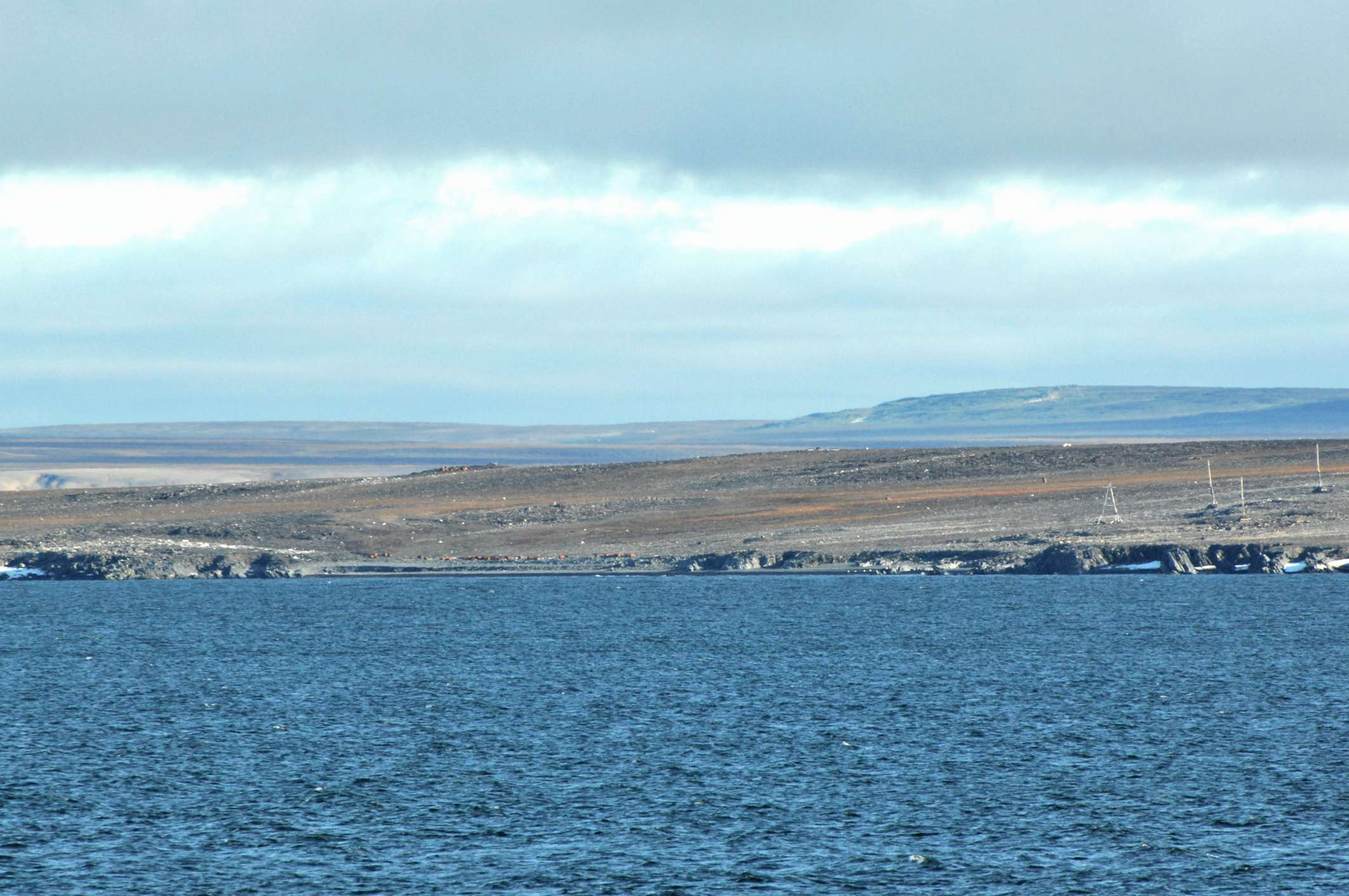
Cape Chelyuskin, northernmost point of Afro-Eurasian mainland; 77°43'22" N, 104°15'13" E

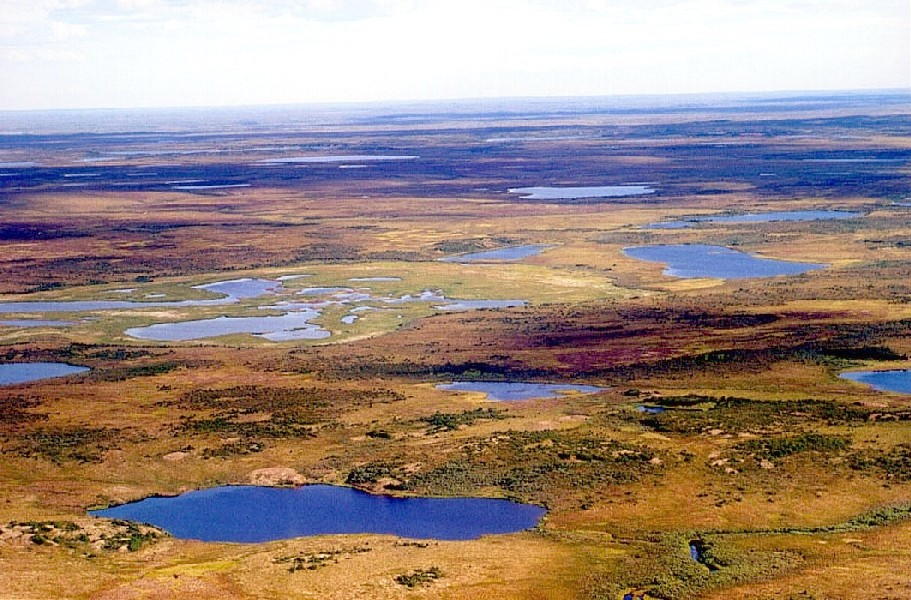
Taymyr landscape

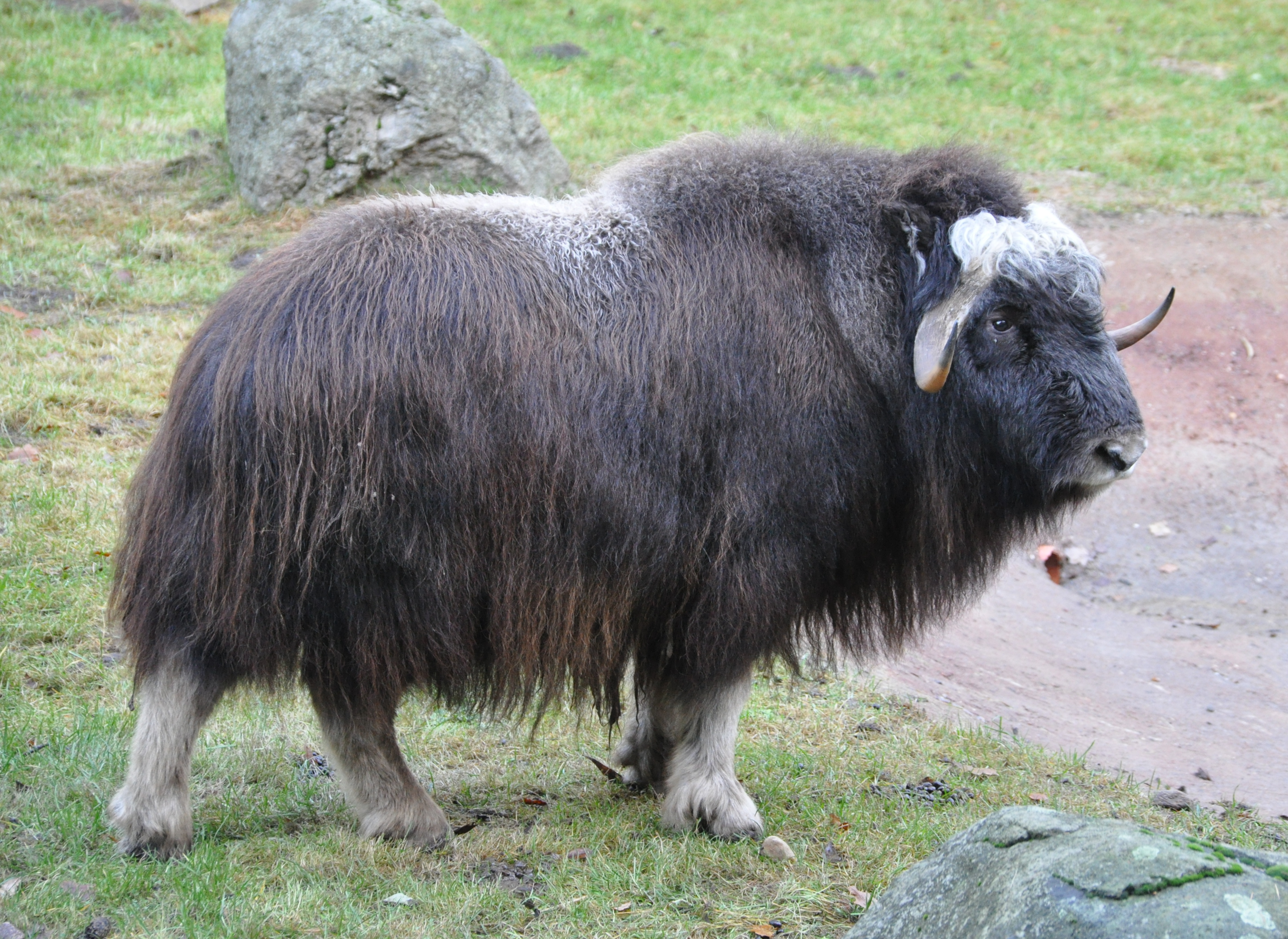
Muskox, an Arctic mammal of the family Bovidae, successfully reintroduced to the Taymyr Peninsula region in 1975

The peninsula is the site of the last known naturally occurring muskox outside of North America, which died out about 2,000 years ago. They were successfully reintroduced in 1975. The population grew to 2,500 in 2002, increasing to 6,500 in 2010.

A study in 2021 found that, based on eDNA, woolly mammoths survived on the Taymyr Peninsula until 3,900 to 4,100 years ago, roughly concurrent with another population on Wrangel Island. The Taymyr Peninsula, with its drier habitat, may have served as a refugium for the mammoth steppe, supporting mammoths and other widespread Ice Age mammals, such as wild horses (Equus sp.).

== Climate ==
The coasts of the Taymyr Peninsula are frozen most of the year, between September and June on average. The summer season is short, especially on the shores of the Laptev Sea in the northeast. The climate in the north and exterior of the peninsula is Tundra Climate (ET), while some areas further-south have a very cold but somewhat more continental subarctic climate, with winters even slightly colder than the tundra directly to the north, but with somewhat warmer summers that can support some tree growth. Winters are harsh, with frequent blizzards and extremely low temperatures. The following data for Cape Chelyuskin provides an indication of the weather experienced in the northern part of the peninsula.

Climate data for Cape Chelyuskin
Month	Jan	Feb	Mar	Apr	May	Jun	Jul	Aug	Sep	Oct	Nov	Dec	Year
Record high °C (°F)	0.3 (32.5)	−0.5 (31.1)	−0.4 (31.3)	6.3 (43.3)	8.2 (46.8)	15.6 (60.1)	23.3 (73.9)	21.6 (70.9)	13.4 (56.1)	5.4 (41.7)	0.2 (32.4)	−0.6 (30.9)	23.3 (73.9)
Mean daily maximum °C (°F)	−24 (−11)	−23.9 (−11.0)	−21.7 (−7.1)	−15.2 (4.6)	−6.8 (19.8)	0.8 (33.4)	3.5 (38.3)	3.6 (38.5)	0.2 (32.4)	−7.2 (19.0)	−15.6 (3.9)	−21.3 (−6.3)	−10.6 (12.9)
Daily mean °C (°F)	−27.2 (−17.0)	−27.1 (−16.8)	−25.1 (−13.2)	−18.6 (−1.5)	−9.1 (15.6)	−0.9 (30.4)	1.5 (34.7)	1.6 (34.9)	−1.4 (29.5)	−9.6 (14.7)	−18.7 (−1.7)	−24.4 (−11.9)	−13.2 (8.1)
Mean daily minimum °C (°F)	−30.5 (−22.9)	−30.2 (−22.4)	−28.5 (−19.3)	−21.7 (−7.1)	−11.4 (11.5)	−2.3 (27.9)	0.0 (32.0)	0.1 (32.2)	−3.0 (26.6)	−12.4 (9.7)	−21.9 (−7.4)	−27.4 (−17.3)	−15.8 (3.6)
Record low °C (°F)	−48.8 (−55.8)	−45.8 (−50.4)	−45.9 (−50.6)	−41.7 (−43.1)	−28.9 (−20.0)	−18.0 (−0.4)	−5.6 (21.9)	−9.0 (15.8)	−21.2 (−6.2)	−33.6 (−28.5)	−41.9 (−43.4)	−45.6 (−50.1)	−48.8 (−55.8)
Average precipitation mm (inches)	11 (0.4)	12 (0.5)	12 (0.5)	14 (0.6)	15 (0.6)	14 (0.6)	27 (1.1)	32 (1.3)	23 (0.9)	22 (0.9)	15 (0.6)	13 (0.5)	210 (8.5)
Average rainy days	0	0	0	0	0.4	6	13	13	6	0.6	0	0	38
Average snowy days	16	15	15	15	22	11	4	6	16	24	21	17	183
Average relative humidity (%)	83	83	82	83	86	90	93	94	91	86	84	83	86
Mean monthly sunshine hours	0.0	4.0	113.0	252.0	216.0	145.0	161.0	95.0	43.0	15.0	0.0	0.0	1,044
Source 1: pogoda.ru.net
Source 2: NOAA (sun only, 1961-1990)

== See also ==
- Siberia
- Taymyr Strait

== Bibliography ==
- Hoppál, Mihály (2005). Sámánok Eurázsiában (in Hungarian). Budapest: Akadémiai Kiadó. ISBN 9630582953. (The title means “Shamans in Eurasia”, the book is written in Hungarian, but it is published also in German, Estonian and Finnish: Site of publisher with short description on the book (in Hungarian).)
