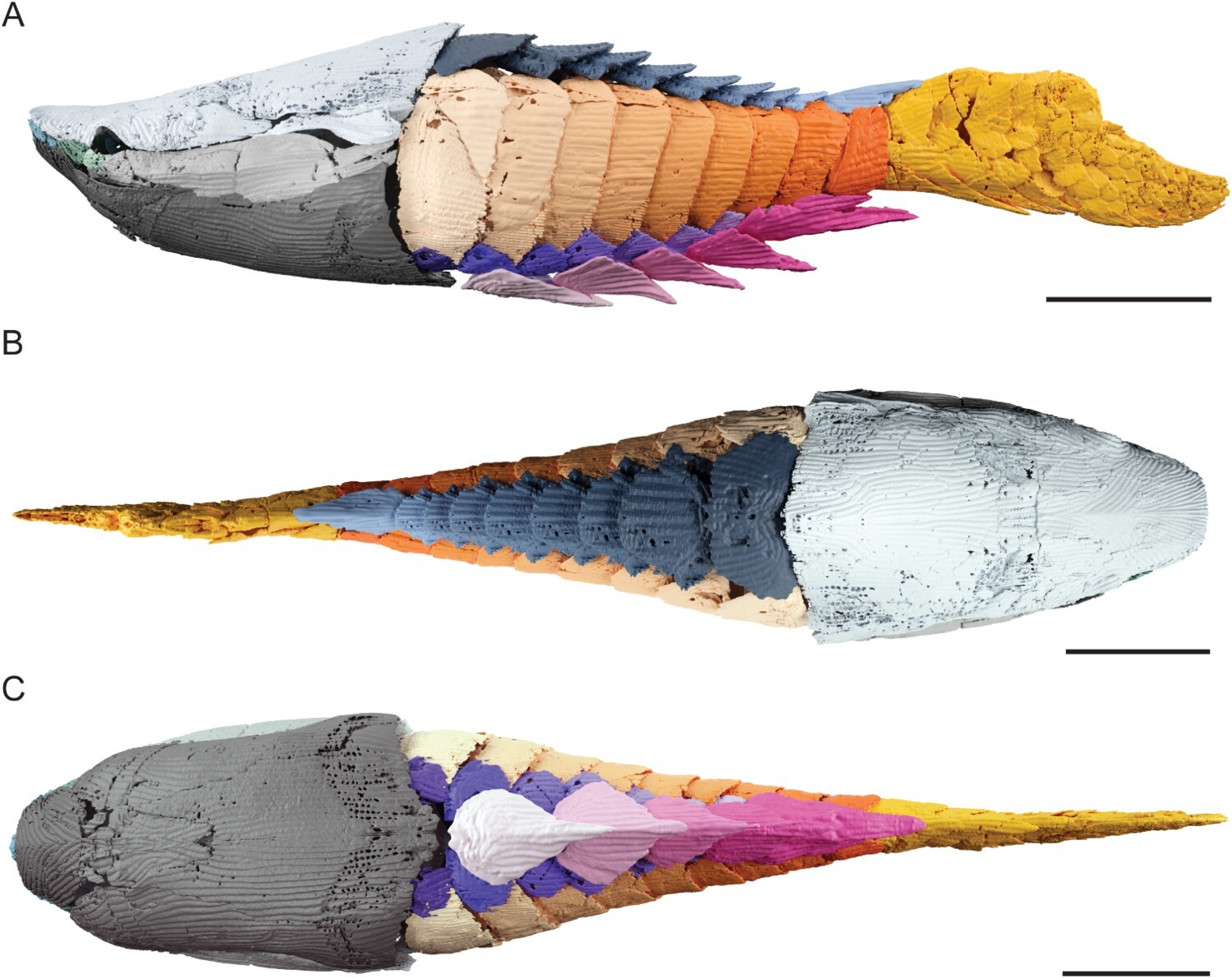
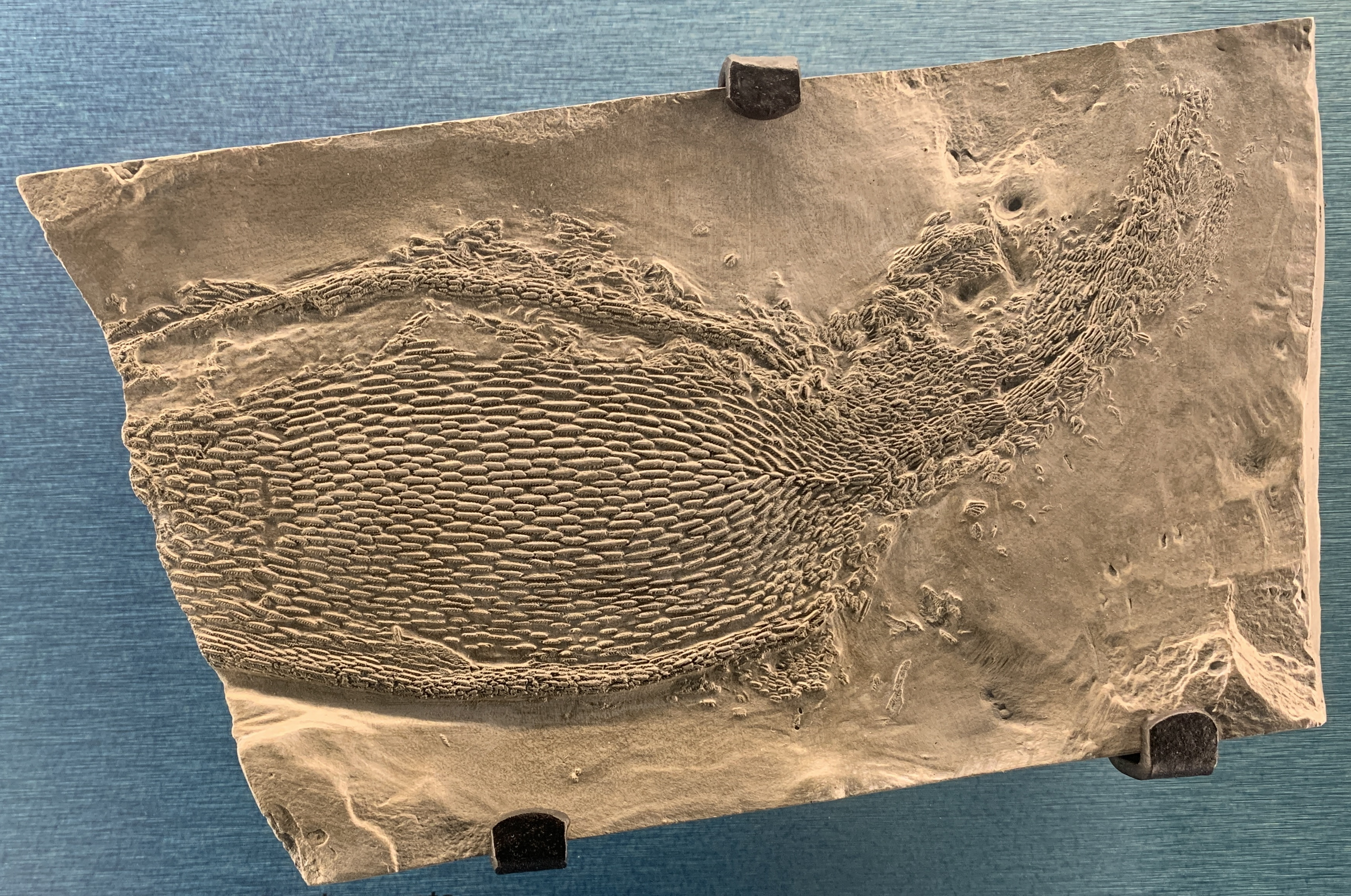
- Fossil specimens of various heterostracans (from left to right in each row, top to bottom): Errivaspis wayensis (a pteraspid pteraspidiform), Drepanaspis gemuendenensis (a psammosteid pteraspidiform), Anglaspis heintzi (a cyathaspid), and Lepidaspis serrata (a 'tessellate heterostracan')

Scientific classification
- Kingdom: Animalia
- Phylum: Chordata
- Infraphylum: Agnatha
- Class: †Pteraspidomorpha
- Subclass: †Heterostraci; Lankester 1868

Orders
- Cardipeltida; Corvaspidida; Cyathaspidiformes; Pteraspidiformes; Lepidaspidida; Tesseraspidida; Tolypelepidida; Traquairaspidiformes

= Heterostraci =

Heterostraci Temporal range: Silurian, Llandovery (Telychian) to Late Devonian (Frasnian), 438–378 Ma

Extinct subclass of jawless fishes

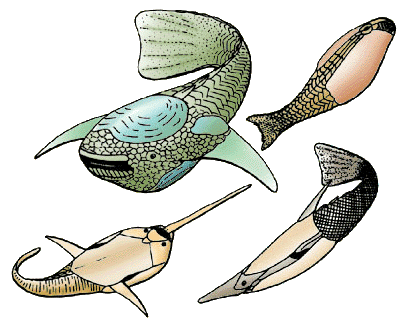
Among the most primitive heterostracans are tolypelepids (top right). Most heterostracans are pteraspidiforms, such as the pteraspidids (bottom right), doryaspidids (bottom left) and the huge psammosteids (top left), which are the youngest known members of the group.

Heterostraci (Ancient Greek, ἕτερος+ὄστρακον "those [with] a different shell" [-i is pl. of -us]) is an extinct subclass of pteraspidomorph, ostracoderm, jawless vertebrate that lived primarily in marine and estuary environments. Heterostraci existed from the Silurian to the Late Devonian.

== Description and anatomy ==
The heterostracans differed from other Paleozoic agnathan taxa both in the arrangement and histology of their scales.

Most heterostracans had two plates which form a large dorsal shield and a large ventral shield, and had series of scales arranged in various patterns on the sides of their bodies, the exact pattern differing from one group to another. In a few primitive forms, such as Lepidaspis, the dorsal and ventral shields are composed of a mosaic of tiny scales. In most other known forms, though, these tiny scales have fused together to form the shield-plates.

The scales of heterostracans are histologically distinct from other vertebrates, having three layers composed of dentine and aspidine, an acellular bony tissue unique to animals of this class and Thelodonti. The middle layer was honeycombed with tiny spaces called "cancella."

As with many agnathan groups, heterostracans had no fins besides the tail or caudal fin. In some pteraspids, especially in the psammosteids, the ends of the branchial plates (the plates that covered the gills) is drawn out to form wing-like extensions.

== Taxonomy ==
Heterostraci are divided into several orders, including the two most diverse orders, Cyathaspidiformes ("Cup Shields"), and Pteraspidiformes ("Wing Shields"), as well as the Cardipeltida, Corvaspidida, Tolypelepidida, Tesseraspidida, and the Traquairaspidiformes. The predominantly Silurian Tolypelepidida (the best known member being Athenaegis), is regarded as being a sister group of the Cyathaspids and Pteraspidids, while the Early Devonian Lepidaspis is regarded as being incertae sedis, possibly close to the original basal forms.

=== Cyathaspidiformes ===
Cyathaspidiformes is divided into two main subgroups: the Amphiaspidida of Early Devonian Siberia (i.e., Amphiaspis, Gabreyaspis, and Edaphaspis, grouped together with their relative Ctenaspis of Canada), and the Cyathaspidida (i.e., Cyathaspis, Poraspis, and Anglaspis), grouped together with their relative Nahanbiaspis.

=== Pteraspidiformes ===
The Pteraspidiformes is divided up into five families, four of which, Anchipteraspididae, Gigantaspididae, Pteraspididae, and Protaspididae are monophyletic: Protopteraspididae has recently been determined to be paraphyletic within Pteraspidiformes, and thus, no longer valid, while Psammosteidae is now regarded as a separate subtaxon within Pteraspidiformes, "Psammosteida," as the sister taxon of the most basal family, Anchipteraspidae. Pteraspididae, Gigantaspididae and Protaspididae, in turn form the suborder Pteraspidoidei, with various genera of Protopteraspididae as sister taxa.

=== Phylogeny ===
Based on the work of Mikko Haaramo.

- Heterostraci
  - Tesseraspidiformes
  - - †Traquairaspidiformes
    - - Tolypelepidiformes
      - - Cyathaspidiformes
        - Pteraspidiformes

The most comprehensive study on pteraspidomorph relationships is by Randle et al. (2025). The result of their maximum parsimony analysis is shown below:

- Pteraspidomorphi
  - - Astraspis
    - Eriptychius
  - - Arandaspida
      - Sacabambaspis
      - Arandaspis
    - Heterostraci
      - Amphiaspidida
      - - Natlaspis
        - - "Traquairaspis" mackenziensis
          - - - Corveolepis
              - Cyathaspidida
            - - - "Corveolepis" elgae
                - - Aporemaspis
                  - Aserotaspis
                  - Oniscolepis
                  - Kallostrakon
                  - - Lepidaspis
                    - Tesseraspis
                  - Cardipeltis
              - - Corvaspis
                - Traquairaspidida
                - Pteraspidiformes (including Psammosteida)

== See also ==
- Astraspidida
- Thelodonti
- Galeaspida
- Osteostraci
- Lepidaspis
