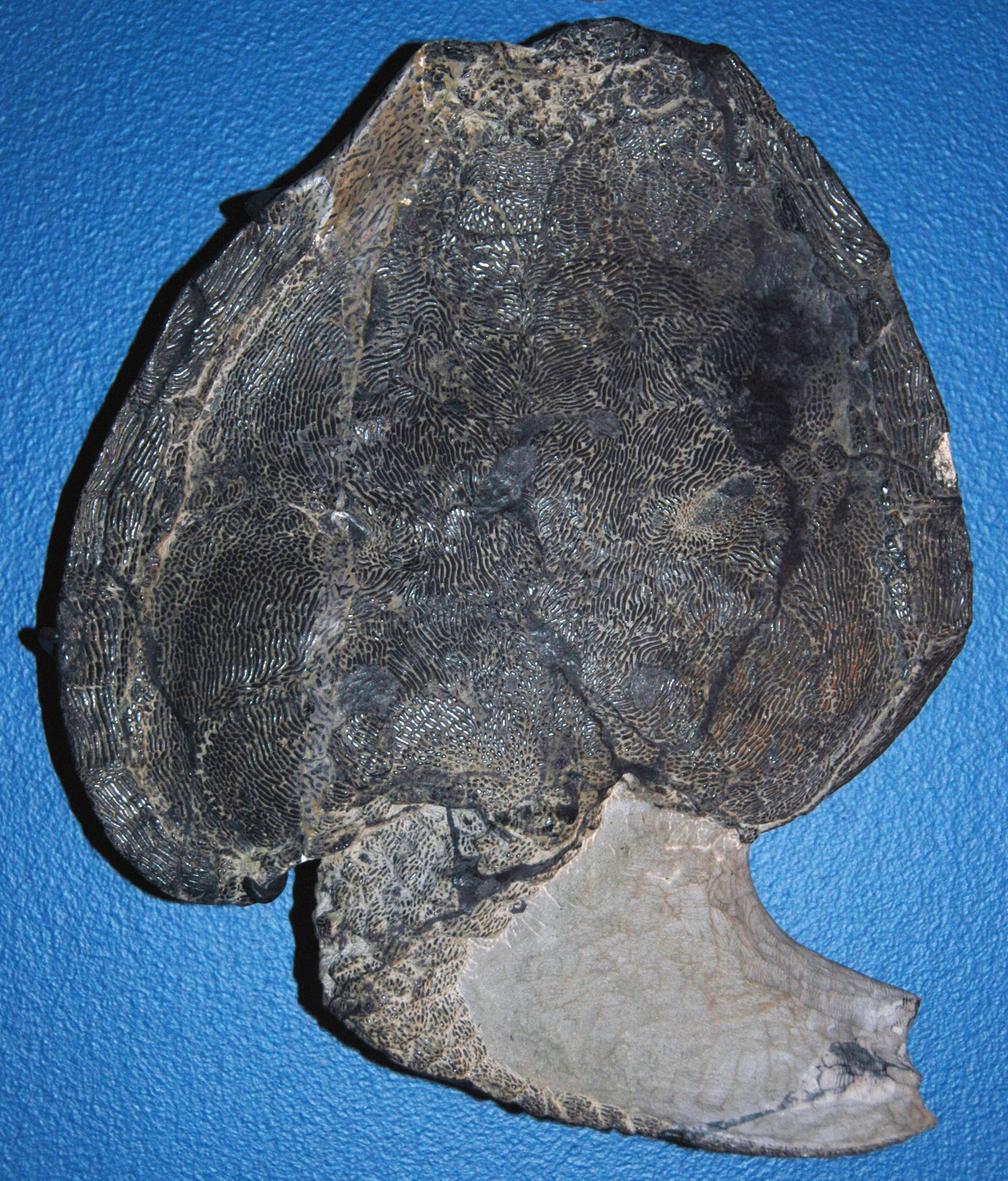
- C. richardsoni specimen on display at the Field Museum of Natural History

Scientific classification
- Kingdom: Animalia
- Phylum: Chordata
- Infraphylum: Agnatha
- Class: †Pteraspidomorpha
- Subclass: †Heterostraci
- Order: †Cardipeltiformes; Bryant, 1933
- Family: †Cardipeltidae; Garadiner, 1967
- Genus: †Cardipeltis; Branson & Mehl, 1931

Type species
- C. wallacii Branson & Mehl, 1931

Other Species
- C. bryanti Denison, 1966; C. richardsoni Denison, 1966

Synonyms
- C. oblongus; C. sinclairi

= Cardipeltis =

Cardipeltis Temporal range: Early Devonian Lochkovian-Emsian ~419–394 Ma

Extinct genus of jawless fishes

Cardipeltis is an extinct genus of heterostracan jawless-fish from the early Devonian of Utah and Wyoming. Material of the fish has come from the Beartooth Butte Formation and Water Canyon Formation. Compared to other members of Heterostraci, Cardipeltis was strange. While having a dorsal shield similar to what is seen in more well known groups such as pteraspids, the ventral shield is made up of a large number of small polygonal plates more similar to what is seen in "Tessellate heterostracans". Along with this, unlike other members of the subclass, the brachial openings of the fish were located on the dorsal surface rather than on the sides. Due to this strange anatomy, the exact placement of Cardipeltis within Heterostraci has been disputed. Depending on the author, it was suggested to be closely related to Pteraspidiformes, Psammosteidae, Cyathaspididae, or "Tessellate heterostracans". More recent studies suggest that Cardipeltis is closely related to "Tessellate heterostracans". The environments that the fish is presented in represent brackish to freshwater environments, mainly bays and deltas.

== History ==
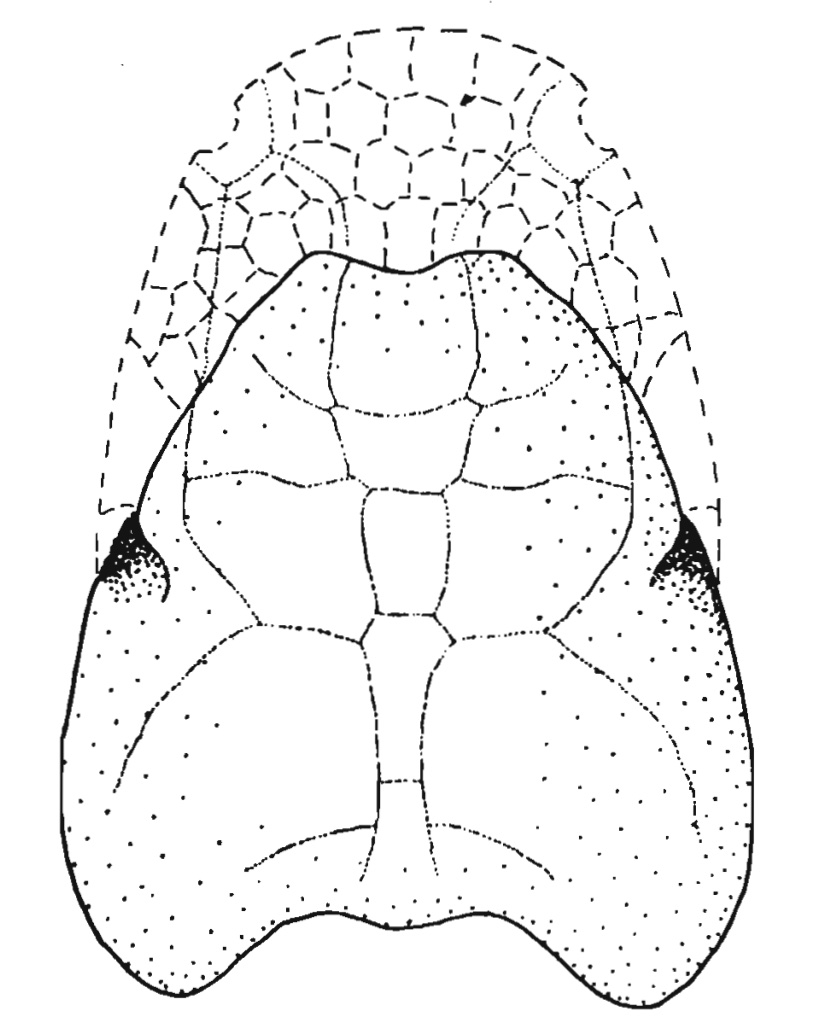
The now-outdated interpretation of the complete head shield of Cardipeltis by Stensiö

The first two collected specimens of Cardipeltis (601VP and 602VP) were collected from a locality from the early Devonian Water Canyon Formation within the Blacksmith Fork Canyon in Cache County, Utah. Both specimens are made up of internal molds, with the more complete of these specimens (601VP) represents both the dorsal and ventral shields. These specimens were then described as Cardipeltis wallacii by E. B. Branson and M. G. Mehl in 1931. Two years later, William L. Bryant coined the family name Cardipeltidae and described two new species of the genus from the Beartooth Butte Formation: C. sinclairi and C. oblongus. The former was described based on a counterpart of a dorsal shield and the latter was described based on a dorsal shield. In 1953, Robert H. Denison described a third specimen of C. wallaci (PF 895) made up of the anterior half of a dorsal shield along with the rim of a dorsal shield (PF 805) from the Cottonwood Canyon section of the Beartooth Butte Formation in Wyoming. In 1958, Erik Stensiö redescribed the genus, showing an interpretation that had a large amount of the anterior portion of the shield missing in known specimens. In 1966, Denison published a much more in depth description of the genus based on a number of specimens from the Cottonwood Canyon section of the Beartooth Butte Formation. Part of this publication was placing the two species described by Bryant as synonyms of the type species. This was due to the taphonomy seen in the holotype of C. sinclairi and more preparation work done on C. oblongus. Some of these specimens were named as new species resulting in the species C. bryanti and C. richardsoni. C. bryanti was named based on the holotype dorsal shield (FMNH PF3905) along with three referred specimens. One of these (FMNH PF3895) is an articulated specimen with a prepared ventral shield. The second species he named, C. richardsoni, was based on a holotype (FMNH PF3902) represented by a dorsal shield and eleven referred specimens. Similar to the other species, one of these specimens (FMNH PF3897) is represented by an articulated specimen with a prepared dorsal shield.

== Description ==
Similar to a majority of jawless fish, Cardipeltis is a small fish with it having a headshield length of 104–159 millimetres (4.1–6.3 in) depending on the species and specimen. In the specimen where both a headshield and tail are preserved, the tail is slightly longer than the headshield.

=== Headshield ===
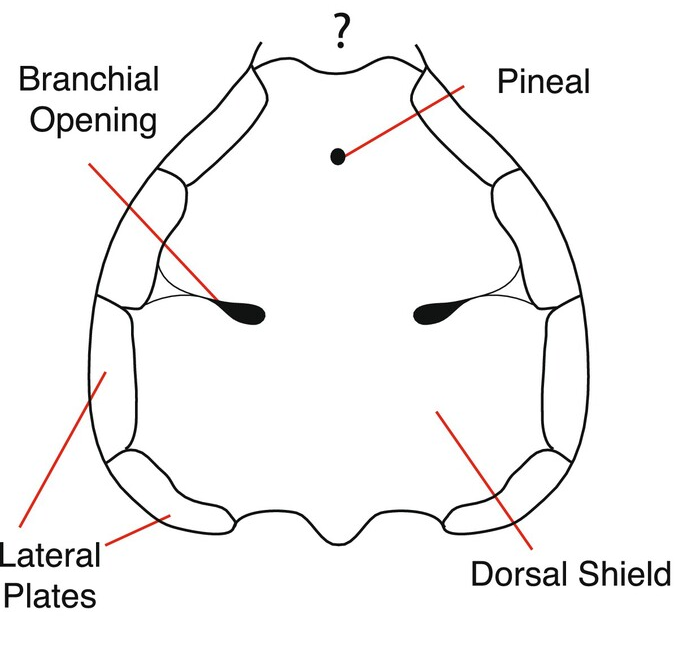
Anatomical diagram of the headshield

The rostral region is very poorly preserved in specimens with the only specimen including it (PF 3897) still not being complete. Rather than a single plate, the rostral region is a short structure made up of a number of plates. Though incomplete in the specimen, it was most likely only 20–30 millimetres (0.79–1.18 in) long. Also unlike other heterostracans, there is no evidence of orbital plates seen in specimens of Cardipeltis. Rather than the animal lacking eyes, it has been suggested that the eyes were more likely located very anteriorly near the mouth. There is a single isolated orbital plate (PF 3932) that most likely belongs to the fish but proper studies of the material have not been done due to the bone being imbedded in plastic. The dorsal shield of Cardipeltis is a large, flat disc-shaped plate that is made up of three lobes, making it almost heart-shaped. This is the anterior lobe and a paired postbranchial lobe located behind the branchial openings. The exact size of these lobes relative to one another slightly differ between species though the postbranchial lobe is always wider. The branchial openings of the fish are strange for heterostracan due to them being located near the midline of the shield rather than the lateral sides of the body. Leading to each of the openings is a notch that would have been covered by small plates. Unlike what is seen in closely related groups like cyathaspids, Cardipeltis lacks gill pouches on the underside of the dorsal shield. It has been suggested that the gills themselves would have sat more anteriorly than the openings. Besides the branchial grooves, the most notable feature of the inner surface of the dorsal shield is a shallow groove that runs along the midline and becomes a ridge posteriorly. The dorsal shield is ornamented with ridges radiating from the posterior portion of the midline. While ridges near the back of the shield head head towards this center of radiation, those in the front instead are angled more laterally. The size of these ridges differ depending on how close they are to the center of the shield. They start out fairly long but towards the edges of the shield, the get smaller until they simply become ovular tubercles.

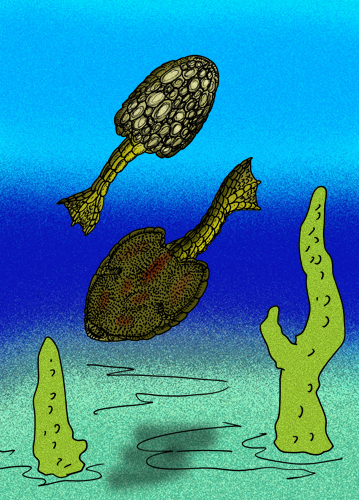
Life restoration of C. bryanti

Along the lateral sides of the fish there are four to eight paired bones (depending on the species) that are similar in morphology to the branchial plates in pteraspids and cyathaspids. Each of these lateral plates fold inwards to form laminae that insert into both the dorsal and ventral plates with the former being wider than the latter. The anterior-most plate is the longest of these bones. Closely-shaped, irregular dentine ridges are found along the ventral lamina and surrounding those are much smaller rows of ridges that most likely represent growth. The ornamentation on the dorsal laminae is much more similar to what is seen in the dorsal shield. The second and third plates are slightly shorter than the one in front of it. The posterior-most lateral plates of Cardipeltis are very small with them being about the size of nearby scales. The ventral shield of the fish is made up of a large number of plates rather than a single one. The anterior portion of the shield is formed by at least two elongate postoral plates that differ in size and shape. Behind these plates is a large number of pentagonal and hexagonal tesserae. These decrease in size within the posterior portion of the shield. In a few isolated specimens, some of these small plates are fused though this is very uncommon. Oral plates are unknown from the fish but it is most likely that they would have been similar to what is seen in Drepanaspis.

=== Tail ===
The tail of Cardipeltis is much more narrow than the headshield and was most likely subtriangular in cross section due to having a flattened bottom. The paired ventral scales of the tail are subrectangular, being organized in double rows. The front portion of each scale lacks any sort of ornamentation and is covered by the scale before it. The dentine ridges on the scales are pointed back and outwards. Down the length of the tail, these scales decrease in size with all of these rows ending in a singular large median scale. The rest of the scales are much smaller and are rhombic in shape. Like the larger ventral scales, these scales decrease in size down the length of the tail. Each of these scales have wavy ridges that are in a line down the width of the size. The caudal fin of the fish is made up of three lobes. Both the top and middle lobes of the fin are long with the middle lobe most likely being the longer one. Between these lobes there is a deep 40 millimetres (1.6 in) split. There is also a deeper split measuring 70 millimetres (2.8 in) between the middle and short lower lobe.

=== Sensory Canal System ===
The sensory canal system of the fish is known from throughout the body of the fish with them being the most notable on the dorsal shield. The longest canal on the dorsal shield is the median dorsal canal which runs almost the entire length of the plate with it starting a bit behind the anterior edge of the plate. Medially to it, there is a much smaller supraorbital canal that is connected to the anterior portion of the median canal via a short commissure. Running along the length of the median canals, there are a total of five transverse sensory canals. The longest of these is the first which connects the two median canals. Within about the middle third of the length of the plate, there is the lateral dorsal sensory canal which runs along the lateral edge of the plate. Another canal, the lateral vertral canal, is also found along the length of the lateral portion of the postoral plates and on some marginal plates. Pores of the canal system are also seen on the anterior marginal plates, some plates of the ventral shield.

=== Species ===
| Species | Formation | Diagnosis |
|---|---|---|
| C. wallaci | Water Canyon Formation and Beartooth Butte Formation | Known specimens of the type species have dorsal shield lengths of 132–159 millimetres (5.2–6.3 in) with it being slightly wider than it is long (ratio between 1.05 and 1.15). The anterior lobe of the shield is wider than what is seen in other species, only having a ratio of .73. The branchial openings are 95–105 millimetres (3.7–4.1 in) away from one another. The ornamentation on the dorsal shield is made up of coarse ridges that largely radiated outwards and frontwards and outwards from the midline. Throughout the shield, there are many irregular ridges. All ridges decrease in size laterally, becoming tubercules near the edges and rarely more inwards. |
| C. richardsoni | Beartooth Butte Formation | Known specimens of the species have dorsal shield lengths of 104–133 millimetres (4.1–5.2 in) with it being slightly wider than it is long (ratio between 1.03 and 1.15). The anterior lobe is a bit smaller than the posterior lobe, having ratios ranging from .75-.85 which makes its anterior lobe proportionally smaller than the other species. The branchial openings are 45–60 millimetres (1.8–2.4 in) away from one another. The rnamentation on the dorsal shield is made up of coarse ridges that are parallel to the lateral and anterior edges of the shield. |
| C. bryanti | Beartooth Butte Formation | Known specimens of the species have dorsal shield lengths of 121–137 millimetres (4.8–5.4 in) with it being slightly wider than it is long (ratio .92). The anterior lobe is a bit smaller than the posterior lobe, having ratios ranging from .86-.87. The branchial openings are 45 millimetres (1.8 in) away from one another. Like the other species, the ornamentation of the shield is made up of course ridges but the exact pattern is poorly known. |

== Classification ==
Due to the strange anatomy of Cardipeltis, the interpretations of where the fish fits within Heterstraci has shifted since its original discovery. In this original description by Branson and Mehl, they suggested that it was closely related to what is now known as Americaspis. Due to the fact that they interpreted the anterior portion of the body being a single shield along with the presence of orbital notches. Between 1931 and Denison's major description of the genus in 1966,a number of different relationships for the genus had been suggested. These included cyathaspids, pteraspids, corvaspids, and psammosteids. In the 1966 publication by Denison disagreed with the genus' relationship with psammosteids due to the position of the branchial openings. He instead put forward two hypotheses four its placement within Heterstraci. The first of these is that Cardipeltis was derived from cyathaspids, as he suggested before, and the shield just divided. The other option he put foreword is that it was closely related to what have been referred to as "Tessellate heterostracans" due to there entire exoskeleton being made up of small plates. In this case, the tesserae would require the formation of a large shield on the dorsal surface while keeping small plates everywhere else. This second hypothesis is the one he found more likely. In 1973, Halstead instead treated Cardipeltis and Corvaspis as a transitional point between "Tessellate heterostracans" and the non-tessellate clades Amphiaspididae and Cyathaspididae. In 2025, Emma Randle and coauthors performed the first comprehensive phylogenic analysis of Heterostraci. In this analysis they showed that the genus placed as a sister group to a paraphyletic clade of Tessellate heterostracans as had been suggested by previous authors. Below is the cladogram from the 2025 publication:

- Pteraspidomorphi
  - - Astraspis
    - Eriptychius
  - - Arandaspida
      - Sacabambaspis
      - Arandaspis
    - Heterostraci
      - Amphiaspidida
      - - Natlaspis
        - - "Traquairaspis" mackenziensis
          - - - Corveolepis
              - Cyathaspidida
            - - - "Corveolepis" elgae
                - - Aporemaspis
                  - Aserotaspis
                  - Oniscolepis
                  - Kallostrakon
                  - - Lepidaspis
                    - Tesseraspis
                  - Cardipeltis
              - - Corvaspis
                - Traquairaspidida
                - Pteraspidiformes (including Psammosteida)

== Paleobiology ==
Similar to most other heterstracans, Cardipeltis was most likely a benthic animal that spend most of its time close to the sediment. Along with this, the combination of a heavily armored body and a small tail suggests that it was a slow swimmer. It is known from northwest coastal region of Euramerica, also known as the Old Red Sandstone continent. The Water Canyon Formation represents a more isolated marine bay with a barrier partially blocking it from the ocean along with the Tooele Arch which was parallel to the southern portion of the basin. This bay was influenced by freshwater exiting from a delta, causing it to be less saline than one would expect. A mix of environments including a prodelta, distributary channels, and brackish sediments. Cardipeltis is also known from both of the most well known localities of the Beartooth Butte Formation which represents a mix of environments. The type locality of the formation is represented by the shallow, marginal portions of a bay within a flooded river valley. Similar to Water Canyon, these parts of the bay have been suggested to have been an estuary. Cottonwood Canyon, another locality of Beartooth Butte Formation is also a channel fill deposit. The layering of plants within the locality shows a pattern of flooding and subsequent growth then burying of Sengelia. Gosslingia and a plant similar in morphology to Trimerophyton are also known from the locality. A number of pteraspids, actinolepids, cyathaspids, and osteostracans are the most common features of these faunas.
