= Timeline of fish evolution =

Evolution of fish

External videos
- Pikaia gracilens animation The Burgess Shale

The evolution of fishes took place over a timeline which spans the Cambrian to the Cenozoic, including during that time in particular the Devonian, which has been dubbed the "age of fishes" for the many changes during that period.

The Late Devonian extinctions played a crucial role in shaping the evolution of fish, or vertebrates in general. Fishes evolved during the Early Paleozoic; by the Devonian, all modern groups (Agnatha, Chondrichthyes, and Osteichthyes) were already present. Devonian aquatic environments were also marked by placoderms and acanthodians, which are only known from fossils, however. After suffering large losses during the Late Devonian extinctions, cartilaginous fishes (Chondrichthyes) and the Actinopterygii among the bony fishes (Osteichthyes) diversified.

The sections below describe the pre-Devonian origin of fish, their Devonian radiation, including the conquest of land by early tetrapods, and the post-Devonian evolution of fishes.

== Pre Devonian: Origin of fish ==
Cambrian	Cambrian (541–485 Ma): The beginning of the Cambrian was marked by the Cambrian explosion, the sudden appearance of nearly all of the invertebrate animal phyla (molluscs, jellyfish, worms and arthropods, such as crustaceans) in great abundance. The first vertebrates appeared in the form of primitive fish, which were subsequently greatly diversified in the Silurian and Devonian.	
Cambrian	Pikaia	Although Pikaia is not actually "first vertebrate" or "first fish", this is still an important organism to show the early forms of chordates. Pikaia is a genus that appeared about 530 Ma during the Cambrian explosion of multicellular life. It is traditionally considered as transitional fossil between invertebrates and vertebrates, and considered as stem-group chordate in 2012. It was a primitive creature with no evidence of eyes, without a well defined head, and less than 2 inches (5.1 centimetres) long. Pikaia was a sideways-flattened, leaf-shaped animal that swam by throwing its body into a series of S-shaped, zig-zag curves, similar to movement of snakes. Fish inherited the same swimming movement, but they generally have stiffer backbones. It had a pair of large head tentacles and a series of short appendages, which may be linked to gill slits, on either side of its head. The flattened body is divided into pairs of segmented muscle blocks, seen as faint vertical lines. The muscles lie on either side of a flexible structure resembling a rod that runs from the tip of the head to the tip of the tail.
Cambrian	Haikouichthys	Haikouichthys (fish from Haikou) is a genus that also appears in the fossil record about 530 Ma, and marks the transition from invertebrate to vertebrates. Haikouichthys is craniates (animals with backbones and distinct heads). Unlike Pikaia, they had eyes. They also had a defined skull and other characteristics that have led paleontologists to label it a true craniate, and even to be popularly characterized as one of the earliest fishes. Cladistic analysis indicates that the animal is probably a basal chordate or a basal craniate; but it does not possess sufficient features to be included uncontroversially even in either stem group.
Cambrian	Myllokunmingia	Myllokunmingia is a genus that appeared about 530 Ma. It is a chordate, and it has been argued that it is a vertebrate, It is 28 mm long and 6 mm high, and is among the oldest possible craniates.
Cambrian	Conodont	Conodonts (cone-teeth) resembled primitive eels. They appeared 495 Ma and were wiped out 200 Ma. Initially they were known only from tooth-like microfossils called conodont elements. These "teeth" have been variously interpreted as filter-feeding apparatuses or as a "grasping and crushing array". Conodonts ranged in length from a centimeter to the 40 cm Promissum. Their large eyes had a lateral position of which makes a predatory role unlikely. The preserved musculature hints that some conodonts (Promissum at least) were efficient cruisers but incapable of bursts of speed. In 2012 researchers classify the conodonts in the phylum Chordata on the basis of their fins with fin rays, chevron-shaped muscles and notochord. Some researchers see them as vertebrates similar in appearance to modern hagfish and lampreys, though phylogenetic analysis suggests that they are more derived than either of these groups.
Cambrian	Ostracoderms	Ostracoderms (shell-skinned) are any of several groups of extinct, primitive, jawless fishes that were covered in an armour of bony plates. They appeared in the Cambrian, about 510 million years ago, and became extinct towards the end of the Devonian, about 377 million years ago. Initially Ostracoderms had poorly formed fins, and paired fins, or limbs, first evolved within this group. They were covered with a bony armour or scales and were often less than 30 cm (12 in) long.
Ordov- ician	Ordovician (485–443 Ma): Fish, the world's first true vertebrates, continued to evolve, and those with jaws (Gnathostomata) may have first appeared late in this period. Life had yet to diversify on land.	
Ordov- ician	Arandaspis	Arandaspis are jawless fish that lived in the early Ordovician period, about 480–470 Ma. It was about 15 cm (6 in) long, with a streamlined body covered in rows of knobbly armoured scutes. The front of the body and the head were protected by hard plates with openings for the eyes, nostrils and gills. Although it was jawless, Arandaspis might have had some moveable plates in its mouth, serving as lips, sucking in food particles. The low position of its mouth suggests it foraged the ocean floor. It is not known how its trunk and caudal fin looked like.
Ordov- ician	Astraspis	Astraspis (star shield) is an extinct genus of primitive jawless fish related to other Ordovician fishes, such as Sacabambaspis and Arandaspis. Fossils show clear evidence of a sensory structure (lateral line system). The arrangement of these organs in regular lines allows the fish to detect the direction and distance from which a disturbance in the water is coming. Arandaspis are thought to have had a mobile tail covered with small protective plates and a head region covered with larger plates. A specimen described by Sansom et al. had relatively large, lateral eyes and a series of eight gill openings on each side.
Ordov- ician	Pteraspidomorphi	Pteraspidomorphi is an extinct class of early jawless fish. The fossils show extensive shielding of the head. Many had hypocercal tails to generate lift to increase ease of movement through the water for their armoured bodies, which were covered in dermal bone. They also had sucking mouth parts and some species may have lived in fresh water.
Ordov- ician	Thelodonts	Thelodonts (nipple teeth) are a class of small, extinct jawless fishes with distinctive scales instead of large plates of armour. There is debate over whether these represent a monophyletic grouping, or disparate stem groups to the major lines of jawless and jawed fish. Thelodonts are united by their characteristic "thelodont scales". This defining character is not necessarily a result of shared ancestry, as it may have been evolved independently by different groups. Thus the thelodonts are generally thought to represent a polyphyletic group. If they are monophyletic, there is no firm evidence on what their ancestral state was. These scales were easily dispersed after death; their small size and resilience makes them the most common vertebrate fossil of their time. The fish lived in both freshwater and marine environments, first appearing during the Ordovician, and perishing during the Frasnian–Famennian extinction event of the Late Devonian. They were predominantly deposit-feeding bottom dwellers, although some species may have been pelagic.
Ordov- ician	The Ordovician ended with the Ordovician–Silurian extinction event (450–440 Ma). Two events occurred that killed off 27% of all families, 57% of all genera and 60% to 70% of all species. Together they are ranked by many scientists as the second largest of the five major extinctions in Earth's history in terms of percentage of genera that became extinct.	
Silurian	Silurian (443–419 Ma): Many evolutionary milestones occurred during this period, including the appearance of armoured jawless fish, jawed fish, spiny sharks and ray-finned fish.	
Silurian		While it is traditional to refer to the Devonian as the age of fishes, recent findings have shown the Silurian was also a period of considerable diversification. Jawed fish developed movable jaws, adapted from the supports of the front two or three gill arches
Silurian	Anaspida	Anaspida (without shield) is an extinct class of primitive jawless vertebrates that lived during the Silurian and Devonian periods. Anaspids were small, primarily marine agnathans that lacked heavy bony shield and paired fins, but have highly exaggerated hypocercal tails. They first appeared in the Early Silurian, and flourished until the Late Devonian extinction, where most species, save for lampreys, became extinct. Unusually for an agnathan, anaspids did not possess a bony shield or armour. The head is instead covered in an array of smaller, weakly mineralised scales.
Silurian	Osteostraci	Osteostraci ("bony shields") was a class of bony-armored jawless fish that lived from the Middle Silurian to Late Devonian. Anatomically speaking, the osteostracans, especially the Devonian species, were among the most advanced of all known agnathans. This is due to the development of paired fins, and their complicated cranial anatomy. The osteostracans were more similar to lampreys than to jawed vertebrates in possessing two pairs of semicircular canals in the inner ear, as opposed to the three pairs found in the inner ears of jawed vertebrates. Most osteostracans had a massive cephalothoracic shield, but all Middle and Late Devonian species appear to have had a reduced, thinner, and often micromeric dermal skeleton. They were probably relatively good swimmers, possessing dorsal fins, paired pectoral fins, and a strong tail.
Silurian	Spiny sharks	Spiny sharks, more formally called "Acanthodians" (having spines), constitute the class Acanthodii. They first appeared by the late Silurian ~420 Ma, and were among the first fishes to evolve jaws. They share features with both cartilaginous fish and bony fish, but they are not true sharks, though leading to them. They became extinct before the end of the Permian ~250 Ma. However, scales and teeth attributed to this group, as well as more derived jawed fish, such as cartilaginous and bony fish, date from the Ordovician ~460 Ma. Acanthodians were generally small shark-like fishes varying from toothless filter-feeders to toothed predators. They were once often classified as an order of the class Placodermi, but recent authorities tend to place the acanthodians as a paraphyletic assemblage leading to modern cartilaginous fish. They are distinguished in two respects: they were the earliest known jawed vertebrates, and they had stout spines supporting all their fins, fixed in place and non-movable (like a shark's dorsal fin), an important defensive adaptation. Their fossils are extremely rare.
Silurian	Placoderms	Placoderms, (plate-like skin), are a group of armoured jawed fishes, of the class Placodermi. The oldest fossils appeared during the late Silurian, and became extinct at the end of the Devonian. Recent studies suggest that the placoderms are possibly a paraphyletic group of basal jawed fishes, and the closest relatives of all living jawed vertebrates. Some placoderms were small, flattened bottom-dwellers, such as antiarchs. However many, particularly the arthrodires, were active midwater predators. Dunkleosteus, which appeared later in the Devonian below, was the largest and most famous of these. The upper jaw was firmly fused to the skull, but there was a hinge joint between the skull and the bony plating of the trunk region. This allowed the upper part of the head to be thrown back and, in arthrodires, allowed them to take larger bites.
Silurian	Megamastax	Megamastax, (big mouth), is a genus of lobe-finned fish which lived during the late Silurian period, about 423 million years ago, in China. Before the discovery of Megamastax, it was thought that jawed vertebrates (gnathostomes) were limited in size and variation before the Devonian period. Megamastax is known only from jaw bones and it is estimated that it reached about 1 metre (3 ft 3 in) long.
Silurian	Guiyu oneiros	Guiyu oneiros, the earliest known bony fish. It has the combination of both ray-finned and lobe-finned features, although analysis of the totality of its features place it closer to lobe-finned fish.
Silurian	Andreolepis	The extinct genus Andreolepis includes the earliest known ray finned fish Andreolepis hedei, which appeared in the late Silurian, around 420 Ma.

== Devonian: Age of fishes ==
Events of the Devonian Period
← / Rhynie chert; ← / Hangenberg event; last placoderms disappear; ← / Kellwasser event (Late Devonian extinction); ← / first vertebrates on land; ← / most jawless fish disappear; ← / Hunsrück fauna
Key events of the Devonian Period. Axis scale: millions of years ago.

The Devonian period is broken into the Early, Middle and Late stages. By the start of the Early Devonian 419 mya, jawed fishes had divided into four distinct clades: the placoderms and spiny sharks, both of which are now extinct, and the cartilaginous and bony fishes, both of which are still extant. The modern bony fish, class Osteichthyes, appeared in the late Silurian or early Devonian, about 416 million years ago. Both the cartilaginous and bony fish may have arisen from either the placoderms or the spiny sharks. A subclass of bony fish, the ray-finned fishes (Actinopterygii), have become the dominant group in the post-Paleozoic and modern world, with some 30,000 living species. Meanwhile, another subclass of bony fish, the lobe-finned fishes, became the dominant group on land.

Sea levels in the Devonian were generally high. Marine faunas were dominated by bryozoa, diverse and abundant brachiopods, the enigmatic hederelloids, microconchids and corals. Lily-like crinoids were abundant, and trilobites were still fairly common. Among vertebrates, jawless armoured fish (ostracoderms) declined in diversity, while the jawed fish (gnathostomes) simultaneously increased in both the sea and fresh water. Armoured placoderms were numerous during the lower stages of the Devonian Period but became extinct in the Late Devonian, perhaps because of competition for food against the other fish species. Early cartilaginous (Chondrichthyes) and bony fish (Osteichthyes) also become diverse and played a large role within the Devonian seas. The first abundant genus of shark, Cladoselache, appeared in the oceans during the Devonian Period. The great diversity of fish around at the time have led to the Devonian being given the name "The Age of Fish" in popular culture.

The first ray-finned and lobe-finned bony fish appeared in the Devonian, while the placoderms began dominating almost every known aquatic environment. However, another subclass of Osteichthyes, the Sarcopterygii(which includes lobe-finned fish like coelacanths and lungfish, as well as and tetrapods), was the most diverse group of bony fish in the Devonian. Sarcopterygians are basally characterized by internal nostrils, lobe fins containing a robust internal skeleton, and cosmoid scales.

During the Middle Devonian 393–383 Ma, the armoured jawless ostracoderm fish were declining in diversity; the jawed fish were thriving and increasing in diversity in both the oceans and freshwater. The shallow, warm, oxygen-depleted waters of Devonian inland lakes, surrounded by primitive plants, provided the environment necessary for certain early fish to develop essential characteristics such as well developed lungs and the ability to crawl out of the water and onto the land for short periods of time. Cartilaginous fish, class Chondrichthyes, consisting of sharks, rays and chimaeras, appeared by about 395 million years ago, in the middle Devonian

During the Late Devonian the first forests were taking shape on land. The first tetrapods appeared in the fossil record over a period, the beginning and end of which are marked with extinction events. This lasted until the end of the Devonian 359 mya. The ancestors of all tetrapods began adapting to walking on land, their strong pectoral and pelvic fins gradually evolved into legs (see Tiktaalik). In the oceans, primitive sharks became more numerous than in the Silurian and the late Ordovician. The first ammonite mollusks appeared. Trilobites, the mollusk-like brachiopods and the great coral reefs, were still common.

The Late Devonian extinction occurred at the beginning of the last phase of the Devonian period, the Famennian faunal stage, (the Frasnian-Famennian boundary), about 372.15 Ma. Many fossil agnathan fish, save for the psammosteid heterostracans, make their last appearance shortly before this event. The Late Devonian extinction crisis primarily affected the marine community, and selectively affected shallow warm-water organisms rather than cool-water organisms. The most important group affected by this extinction event were the reef-builders of the great Devonian reef-systems.

A second extinction pulse, the Hangenberg event closed the Devonian period and had a dramatic impact on vertebrate faunas. Placoderms mostly became extinct during this event, as did most members of other groups including lobe-finned fish, acanthodians and early tetrapods in both marine and terrestrial habitats, leaving only a handful of survivors. This event has been related to glaciation in the temperate and polar zones as well as euxinia and anoxia in the seas.

Devonian (419–359 mya): The start of Devonian saw the first appearance of lobe-finned fish, precursors to the tetrapods (animals with four limbs). Major groups of fish evolved during this period, often referred to as the age of fish. See Category:Devonian fish.
D e v o n i a n	Early; Devonian	Early Devonian (419–393 Ma):	
D e v o n i a n	Early; Devonian	Psarolepis	Psarolepis (speckled scale) is a genus of extinct lobe-finned fish that lived around 397 to 418 Ma. Fossils of Psarolepis have been found mainly in South China and described by paleontologist Xiaobo Yu in 1998. It is not known for certain which group Psarolepis belongs to, but paleontologists agree that it is close to the common ancestor of lobe-finned and ray-finned fishes.
D e v o n i a n	Early; Devonian	Holoptychius	Holoptychius is an extinct genus from the order of porolepiform lobe-finned fish, extant from 416 to 359 Ma. It was a streamlined predator about 50 centimetres (20 in) long (though it could grow up to 2.5 m), which fed on other bony fish. Its rounded scales and body form indicate that it could have swum quickly through the water to catch prey. Similar to other rhipidistians, it had fang-like teeth on its palate in addition to smaller teeth on the jaws. Its asymmetrical tail sported a caudal fin on its lower end. To compensate for the downward push caused by this fin placement, Holoptychius's pectoral fins were placed high on the body.
D e v o n i a n	Early; Devonian	Ptyctodontida	The ptyctodontids (beak-teeth) are an extinct monotypic order of unarmored placoderms, containing only one family. They were extant from the start to the end of the Devonian. With their big heads, big eyes, and long bodies, the ptyctodontids bore a strong resemblance to modern day chimaeras (Holocephali). Their armor was reduced to a pattern of small plates around the head and neck. Like the extinct and related acanthothoracids, and the living and unrelated holocephalians, most of the ptyctodontids are thought to have lived near the sea bottom and preyed on shellfish.
D e v o n i a n	Early; Devonian	Petalichthyida	The Petalichthyida was an order of small, flattened placoderms that existed from the beginning of the Devonian to the Late Devonian. They were typified by splayed fins and numerous tubercles that decorated all of the plates and scales of their armour. They reached a peak in diversity during the Early Devonian and were found throughout the world. Because they had compressed body forms, it is supposed they were bottom-dwellers that chased after or ambushed smaller fish. Their diet is not clear, as none of the fossil specimens found have preserved mouth parts.
D e v o n i a n	Early; Devonian	Laccognathus	Laccognathus (pitted jaw) was a genus of amphibious lobe-finned fish that existed 398–360 Ma. They were characterized by the three large pits (fossae) on the external surface of the lower jaw, which may have had sensory functions. Laccognathus grew to 1–2 metres (3–7 ft) in length. They had very short dorsoventrally flattened heads, less than one-fifth the length of the body. The skeleton was structured so large areas of skin were stretched over solid plates of bone. This bone was composed of particularly dense fibers – so dense that exchange of oxygen through the skin was unlikely. Rather, the dense ossifications served to retain water inside the body as Laccognathus traveled on land between bodies of water.
D e v o n i a n	Middle; Devonian	Middle Devonian (393–383 Ma): Cartilaginous fish, consisting of sharks, rays and chimaeras, appeared about 395 Ma.	
D e v o n i a n	Middle; Devonian	Cheirolepis	Cheirolepis (hand fin) was a genus of ray-finned fishes. It was among the most basal of the Devonian ray-finned fish and is considered the first to possess the "standard" dermal cranial bones seen in later ray-finned fish. It was a predatory freshwater fish about 55 centimetres (22 in) long, and based on the size of its eyes it hunted by sight.
D e v o n i a n	Middle; Devonian	Coccosteus	Coccosteus (seed bone) is an extinct genus of arthrodire placoderm. The majority of fossils have been found in freshwater sediments, though they may have been able to enter saltwater. They grew up to 40 centimetres (16 in) long. Like all other arthrodires, Coccosteus had a joint between the armour of the body and skull. It also had an internal joint between its neck vertebrae and the back of the skull, allowing it to open its mouth even wider. Along with the longer jaws, this allowed Coccosteus to feed on fairly large prey. As with all other arthrodires, Coccosteus had bony dental plates embedded in its jaws, forming a beak. The beak was kept sharp by having the edges of the dental plates grind away at each other.
D e v o n i a n	Middle; Devonian	Bothriolepis	External videos: Bothriolepis – Animal Planet; Bothriolepis (pitted scale) was the most successful genus of antiarch placoderms, if not the most successful genus of any placoderm, with over 100 species spread across Middle to Late Devonian strata across every continent.
D e v o n i a n	Middle; Devonian	Pituriaspida	Pituriaspida (hallucinogenic shield) is a class containing two bizarre species of armoured jawless fish with tremendous nose-like rostrums. They lived in estuaries around 390 Ma. The paleontologist Gavin Young, named the class after the hallucinogenic drug pituri, since he thought he might be hallucinating upon viewing the bizarre forms. The better studied species looked like a throwing-dart-like, with an elongate headshield and spear-like rostrum. The other species looked like a guitar pick with a tail, with a smaller and shorter rostrum and a more triangular headshield.
D e v o n i a n	Middle; Devonian	Late Devonian extinction: 375–360 Ma. A prolonged series of extinctions eliminated about 19% of all families, 50% of all genera and 70% of all species. This extinction event lasted perhaps as long as 20 Ma, and there is evidence for a series of extinction pulses within this period.	
D e v o n i a n	Late; Devonian	Late Devonian (383–359 Ma):	
D e v o n i a n	Late; Devonian	Cladoselache	Cladoselache was the first abundant genus of early chondrichthyan, related to modern sharks (though probably closer to holocephalans like chimaeras), appearing about 370 Ma. It grew to 6 feet (1.8 m) long, with anatomical features similar to modern mackerel sharks. It had a streamlined body almost entirely devoid of scales, with five to seven gill slits and a short, rounded snout that had a terminal mouth opening at the front of the skull. It had a very weak jaw joint compared with modern-day sharks, but it compensated for that with very strong jaw-closing muscles. Its teeth were multi-cusped and smooth-edged, making them suitable for grasping, but not tearing or chewing. Cladoselache therefore probably seized prey by the tail and swallowed it whole. It had powerful keels that extended onto the side of the tail stalk and a semi-lunate tail fin, with the superior lobe about the same size as the inferior. This combination helped with its speed and agility, which was useful when trying to outswim its probable predator, the heavily armoured 8.8 metres (29 ft) long placoderm fish Dunkleosteus.
D e v o n i a n	Late; Devonian	Dipterus	Dipterus (two wings) is an extinct genus of lungfish from 376 to 361 Ma. It was about 35 centimetres (14 in) long, mostly ate invertebrates, and had lungs, not an air bladder. Like its ancestor Dipnorhynchus it had tooth-like plates on its palate instead of real teeth. However, unlike its modern relatives, in which the dorsal, caudal, and anal fin are fused into one, its fins were still separated. Otherwise Dipterus closely resembled modern lungfish.
D e v o n i a n	Late; Devonian	Dunkleosteus	External videos: Dunkleosteus – Animal Planet; Dunkleosteus is a genus of arthrodire placoderms that existed from 380 to 360 Ma. Its length estimation varies around 4.1 to 10 metres (13 to 33 ft) long. It was a hypercarnivorous apex predator. Apart from its contemporary Titanichthys (below), no other placoderm rivalled it in size. Instead of teeth, Dunkleosteus had two pairs of sharp bony plates, which formed a beak-like structure. Apart from megalodon, it had the most powerful bite of any fish, generating bite forces in the same league as Tyrannosaurus rex and the modern crocodile.
D e v o n i a n	Late; Devonian	Titanichthys	Titanichthys is a genus of giant, aberrant marine placoderm that lived in shallow seas. Many of the species approached Dunkleosteus in size and build. Unlike its relative, however, the various species of Titanichys had small, ineffective-looking mouth-plates that lacked a sharp cutting edge. It is assumed that Titanichthys was a filter feeder that used its capacious mouth to swallow or inhale schools of small, anchovy-like fish, or possibly krill-like zooplankton, and that the mouth-plates retained the prey while allowing the water to escape as it closed its mouth.
D e v o n i a n	Late; Devonian	Materpiscis	External videos: The mother fish – Nature; Materpiscis (mother fish) is a genus of ptyctodontid placoderm from about 380 Ma. Known from only one specimen, it is unique in having an unborn embryo present inside, and with remarkable preservation of a mineralised placental feeding structure (umbilical cord). This makes Materpiscis the first known vertebrate to show viviparity, or giving birth to live young. The specimen was named Materpiscis attenboroughi in honour of David Attenborough.
D e v o n i a n	Late; Devonian	Hyneria	Hyneria is a genus of predatory lobe-finned fish, about 2.5 m (8.2 ft) long, that lived 360 million years ago.
D e v o n i a n	Late; Devonian	Rhizodonts	Rhizodonts were an order of lobe-finned fish that survived to the end of the Carboniferous, 377–310 Ma. They reached huge sizes. The largest known species, Rhizodus hibberti grew up to 7 metres in length, making it the largest freshwater fish known.

== Fish to tetrapods ==
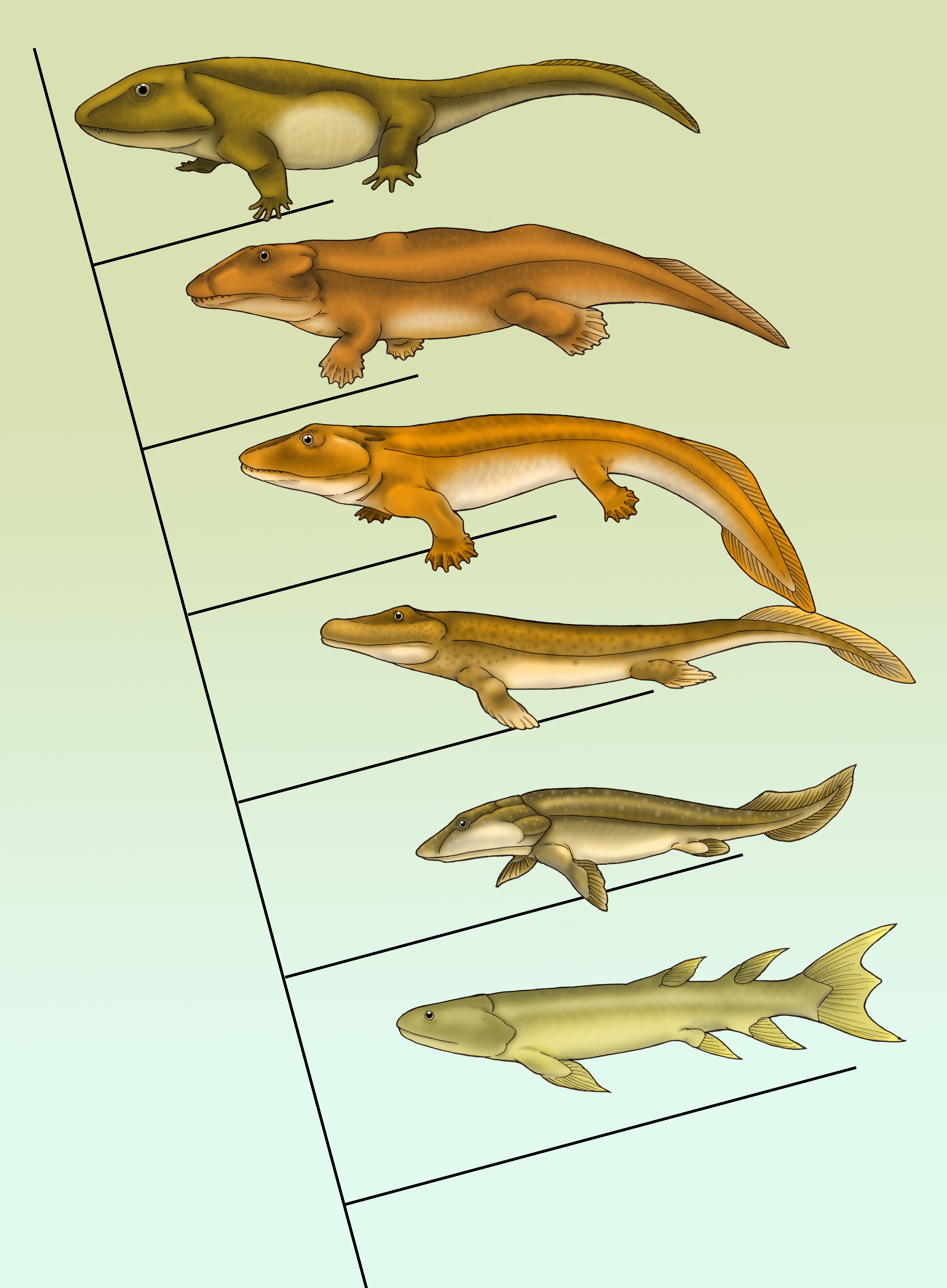
A cladogram of the evolution of tetrapods showing some of the best-known transitional fossils. It starts with Eusthenopteron at the bottom, indisputably still a fish, through Panderichthys, Tiktaalik, Acanthostega and Ichthyostega to Pederpes at the top, indisputably a tetrapod From fins to limbs Illustration showing how much the hindlimb attachments in lobe-finned fishes need to change in transitioning from lobe-finned fishes (A) to early tetrapods (B) if the fish was to become a terrestrial animal. Comparison between the fins of lobe-finned fishes and the legs of early tetrapods: 1. Tiktaalik 2. Panderichthys 3. Eusthenopteron 4. Acanthostega 5. Ichthyostega (hindleg)

The first tetrapods are four-legged, air-breathing, terrestrial animals from which the land vertebrates descended, including humans. They evolved from lobe-finned fish of the clade Sarcopterygii, appearing in coastal water in the middle Devonian, and giving rise to the first amphibians.

The group of lobe-finned fishes that were the ancestors of the tetrapod are grouped together as the Rhipidistia, and the first tetrapods evolved from these fish over the relatively short timespan 385–360 Ma. The early tetrapod groups themselves are grouped as Labyrinthodontia. They retained aquatic, fry-like tadpoles, a system still seen in modern amphibians. From the 1950s to the early 1980s it was thought that tetrapods evolved from fish that had already acquired the ability to crawl on land, possibly so they could go from a pool that was drying out to one that was deeper. However, in 1987, nearly complete fossils of Acanthostega from about 363 Ma showed that this Late Devonian transitional animal had legs and both lungs and gills, but could never have survived on land: its limbs and its wrist and ankle joints were too weak to bear its weight; its ribs were too short to prevent its lungs from being squeezed flat by its weight; its fish-like tail fin would have been damaged by dragging on the ground. The current hypothesis is that Acanthostega, which was about 1 metre (3.3 ft) long, was a wholly aquatic predator that hunted in shallow water. Its skeleton differed from that of most fish, in ways that enabled it to raise its head to breathe air while its body remained submerged, including: its jaws show modifications that would have enabled it to gulp air; the bones at the back of its skull are locked together, providing strong attachment points for muscles that raised its head; the head is not joined to the shoulder girdle and it has a distinct neck.

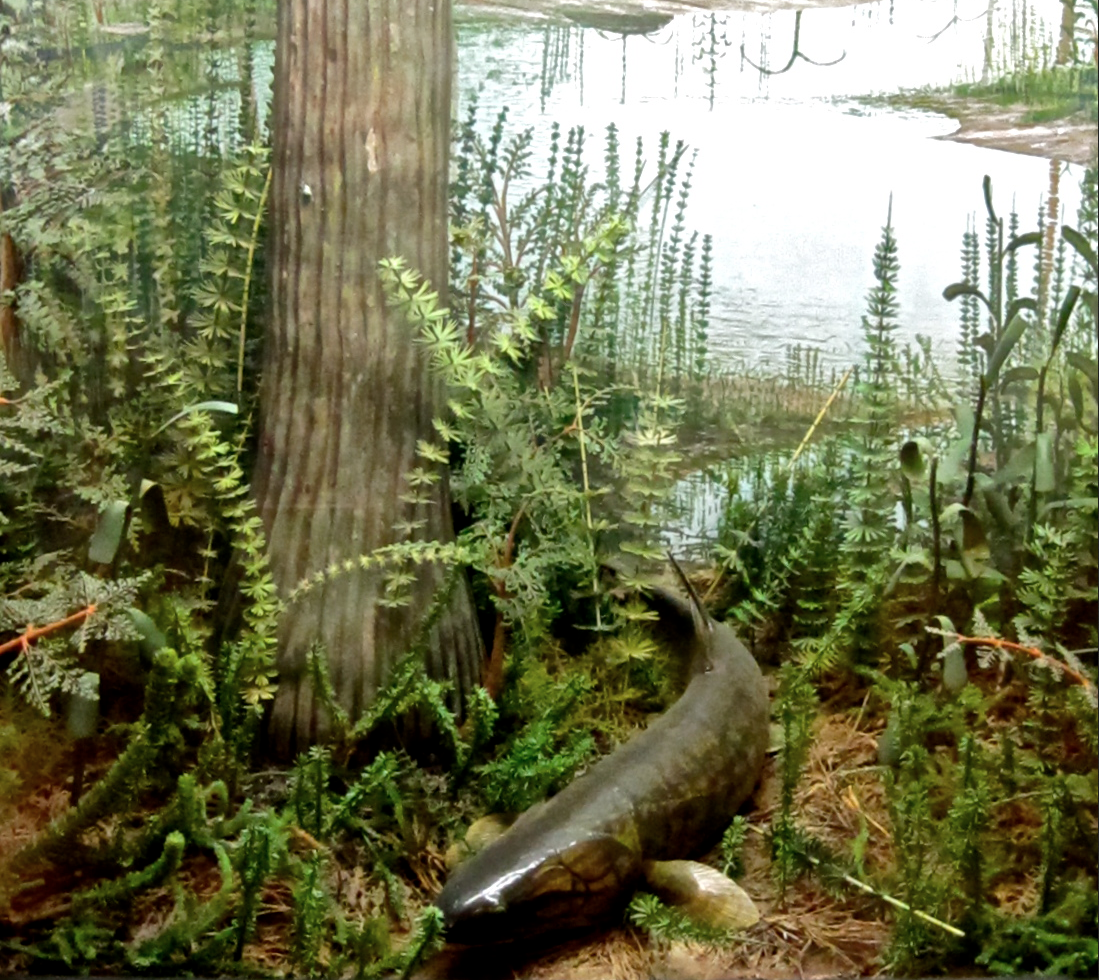
Until the 1980s early transitional lobe-finned fishes, such as the Eusthenopteron shown here, were depicted as emerging onto land. Paleontologists now widely agree this did not happen, and they were strictly aquatic. External videos: Tetrapod Evolution Animal Planet; 1 2 3 4 5; Evolution fish with fingers Transitional fossils – YouTube

The Devonian proliferation of land plants may help to explain why air-breathing would have been an advantage: leaves falling into streams and rivers would have encouraged the growth of aquatic vegetation; this would have attracted grazing invertebrates and small fish that preyed on them; they would have been attractive prey but the environment was unsuitable for the big marine predatory fish; air-breathing would have been necessary because these waters would have been short of oxygen, since warm water holds less dissolved oxygen than cooler marine water and since the decomposition of vegetation would have used some of the oxygen.

There are three major hypotheses as to how tetrapods evolved their stubby fins (proto-limbs). The traditional explanation is the "shrinking waterhole hypothesis" or "desert hypothesis" posited by the American paleontologist Alfred Romer. He believed limbs and lungs may have evolved from the necessity of having to find new bodies of water as old waterholes dried up.

The second hypothesis is the "inter-tidal hypothesis" put forward in 2010 by a team of Polish paleontologists led by Grzegorz Niedźwiedzki. They argued that sarcopterygians may have first emerged unto land from intertidal zones rather than inland bodies of water. Their hypothesis is based on the discovery of the 395 million-year-old Zachełmie tracks in Zachełmie, Poland, the oldest ever discovered fossil evidence of tetrapods.

The third hypothesis, the "woodland hypothesis", was proposed by the American paleontologist Gregory J. Retallack in 2011. He argues that limbs may have developed in shallow bodies of water in woodlands as a means of navigating in environments filled with roots and vegetation. He based his conclusions on the evidence that transitional tetrapod fossils are consistently found in habitats that were formerly humid and wooded floodplains.

Research by Jennifer A. Clack and her colleagues showed that the very earliest tetrapods, animals similar to Acanthostega, were wholly aquatic and quite unsuited to life on land. This is in contrast to the earlier view that fish had first invaded the land — either in search of prey (like modern mudskippers) or to find water when the pond they lived in dried out — and later evolved legs, lungs, etc.

Two ideas about the homology of arms, hands and digits have existed in the past 130 years. First that digits are unique to tetrapods and second that antecedents were present in the fins of early sarcopterygian fish. Until recently it was believed that "genetic and fossil data support the hypothesis that digits are evolutionary novelties".^{p. 640.} However new research that created a three-dimensional reconstruction of Panderichthys, a coastal fish from the Devonian period 385 million years ago, shows that these animals already had many of the homologous bones present in the forelimbs of limbed vertebrates. For example, they had radial bones similar to rudimentary fingers but positioned in the arm-like base of their fins. Thus there was in the evolution of tetrapods a shift such that the outermost part of the fins were lost and eventually replaced by early digits. This change is consistent with additional evidence from the study of actinopterygians, sharks and lungfish that the digits of tetrapods arose from pre-existing distal radials present in more primitive fish. Controversy still exists since Tiktaalik, a vertebrate often considered the missing link between fishes and land-living animals, had stubby leg-like limbs that lacked the finger-like radial bones found in the Panderichthys. The researchers of the paper commented that it "is difficult to say whether this character distribution implies that Tiktaalik is autapomorphic, that Panderichthys and tetrapods are convergent, or that Panderichthys is closer to tetrapods than Tiktaalik. At any rate, it demonstrates that the fish–tetrapod transition was accompanied by significant character incongruence in functionally important structures.".^{p. 638.}

From the end of the Devonian to the Mid Carboniferous a 30 million year gap occurs in the fossil record. This gap, called Romer's gap, is marked by the absence of ancestral tetrapod fossils and fossils of other vertebrates that look well-adapted for life on land.

Transition from lobe-finned fishes to tetrapods
~385 Ma	Eusthenopteron	External videos: Eusthenopteron – Animal Planet; Genus of extinct lobe-finned fishes that has attained an iconic status from its close relationships to tetrapods. Early depictions of this animal show it emerging onto land, however paleontologists now widely agree that it was a strictly aquatic animal. The genus Eusthenopteron is known from several species that lived during the Late Devonian period, about 385 Ma. It was the object of intense study from the 1940s to the 1990s by the paleoichthyologist Erik Jarvik.
	Gogonasus	Gogonasus (snout from Gogo) was a lobe-finned fish known from 3-dimensionally preserved 380 million-year-old fossils found in the Gogo Formation. It was a small fish reaching 30–40 cm (12–16 in) in length. Its skeleton shows several tetrapod-like features. They included the structure of its middle ear, and its fins show the precursors of the forearm bones, the radius and ulna. Researchers believe it used its forearm-like fins to dart out of the reef to catch prey. Gogonasus was first described in 1985 by John A. Long. For almost 100 years Eusthenopteron has been the role model for demonstrating stages in the evolution of lobe-finned fishes to tetrapods. Gogonasus now replaces Eusthenopteron in being a better preserved representative without any ambiguity in interpreting its anatomy.
~385 Ma	Panderichthys	Adapted to muddy shallows, and capable of some kind of shallow water or terrestrial body flexion locomotion. Had the ability to prop itself up. They had large tetrapod-like heads, and are thought to be the most crownward stem fish-tetrapod with paired fins.
~375 Ma	Tiktaalik	A fish with limb-like fins that could take it onto land. It is an example from several lines of ancient sarcopterygian fish developing adaptations to the oxygen-poor shallow-water habitats of its time, which led to the evolution of tetrapods. Paleontologists suggest that it is representative of the transition between non-tetrapod vertebrates (fish) such as Panderichthys, known from fossils 380 million years old, and early tetrapods such as Acanthostega and Ichthyostega, known from fossils about 365 million years old. Its mixture of primitive fish and derived tetrapod characteristics led one of its discoverers, Neil Shubin, to characterize Tiktaalik as a "fishapod".
365 Ma	Acanthostega	A fish-like early labyrinthodont that occupied swamps and changed views about the early evolution of tetrapods. It had eight digits on each hand (the number of digits on the feet is unclear) linked by webbing, it lacked wrists, and was generally poorly adapted to come onto land. Subsequent discoveries revealed earlier transitional forms between Acanthostega and completely fish-like animals.
374–359 Ma	Ichthyostega	External videos: Ichthyostega – Animal Planet; Pierce et al. Vertebral Architecture; 1 2 3 4 5 – YouTube; Until finds of other early tetrapods and closely related fishes in the late 20th century, Ichthyostega stood alone as the transitional fossil between fish and tetrapods, combining a fishlike tail and gills with an amphibian skull and limbs. It possessed lungs and limbs with seven digits that helped it navigate through shallow water in swamps.
359–345 Ma	Pederpes	Pederpes is the earliest known fully terrestrial tetrapod. It is included here to complete the transition of lobe-finned fishes to tetrapods, even though Pederpes is no longer a fish.

By the late Devonian, land plants had stabilized freshwater habitats, allowing the first wetland ecosystems to develop, with increasingly complex food webs that afforded new opportunities. Freshwater habitats were not the only places to find water filled with organic matter and choked with plants with dense vegetation near the water's edge. Swampy habitats like shallow wetlands, coastal lagoons and large brackish river deltas also existed at this time, and there is much to suggest that this is the kind of environment in which the tetrapods evolved. Early fossil tetrapods have been found in marine sediments, and because fossils of primitive tetrapods in general are found scattered all around the world, they must have spread by following the coastal lines — they could not have lived in freshwater only.

- Fossil Illuminates Evolution of Limbs from Fins Scientific American, 2 2 April 2004.

== Post Devonian ==
- During the Carboniferous period, fish diversity seemingly declined and reached low levels during the Permian period.
- The Mesozoic Era began about 252 million years ago in the wake of the Permian-Triassic event, the largest mass extinction in Earth's history, and ended about 66 million years ago with the Cretaceous–Paleogene extinction event, another mass extinction that killed off non-avian dinosaurs, as well as other plant and animal species. It is often referred to as the Age of Reptiles because reptiles were the dominant vertebrates of the time. The Mesozoic witnessed the gradual rifting of the supercontinent Pangaea into separate landmasses. The climate alternated between warming and cooling periods; overall the Earth was hotter than it is today. The impact of the end-Permian event on Bony fishes diversity remains elusive. It appears that there is no major diversity loss, but that can be the result of poor fossil record.

The Mesozoic saw the diversification of neopterygian fishes, the clade that consists of holostean and teleost fishes. Most of them were small in size. The diversity of body shape variety in Triassic, Jurassic, and Early Cretaceous neopterygian fishes has been documented, revealing that the accumulation of novel body shapes in teleost fishes was predominantly gradual throughout this 150 million year period (250Mya - 100Mya). Holostean fishes appear to accumulate body shape variety (so called disparity) between the early Triassic and Toarcian, after which the amount of variety seen among their body shapes remained stable until the end of the Early Cretaceous.

Carbon- iferous	Carboniferous (359–299 Ma): Sharks underwent a major evolutionary radiation during the Carboniferous. It is believed that this evolutionary radiation occurred because the decline of the placoderms at the end of the Devonian period caused many environmental niches to become unoccupied and allowed new organisms to evolve and fill these niches.	
Carbon- iferous	Coastal seas during the Carboniferous: The first 15 million years of the Carboniferous has very few terrestrial fossils. This gap in the fossil record, is called Romer's gap after the American paleontologist Alfred Romer. While it has long been debated whether the gap is a result of fossilisation or relates to an actual event, recent work indicates the gap period saw a drop in atmospheric oxygen levels, indicating some sort of ecological collapse. The gap saw the demise of the Devonian fish-like ichthyostegalian labyrinthodonts, and the rise of the more advanced temnospondyl and reptiliomorphan amphibians that so typify the Carboniferous terrestrial vertebrate fauna. The Carboniferous seas were inhabited by many fish, mainly Elasmobranchs (sharks and their relatives). These included some, like Psammodus, with crushing pavement-like teeth adapted for grinding the shells of brachiopods, crustaceans, and other marine organisms. Other sharks had piercing teeth, such as the Symmoriida; some, the petalodonts, had peculiar cycloid cutting teeth. Most of the sharks were marine, but the Xenacanthida invaded fresh waters of the coal swamps. Among the bony fish, the Palaeonisciformes found in coastal waters also appear to have migrated to rivers. Sarcopterygian fish were also prominent, and one group, the Rhizodonts, reached very large size. Most species of Carboniferous marine fish have been described largely from teeth, fin spines and dermal ossicles, with smaller freshwater fish preserved whole. Freshwater fish were abundant, and include the genera Ctenodus, Uronemus, Acanthodes, Amphicentrum, and Gyracanthus.	
Carbon- iferous	Stethacanthus	As a result of the evolutionary radiation, carboniferous cartilaginous fishes assumed a wide variety of bizarre shapes—including cartilaginous fishes (holocephalian, relative of modern ratfishes) of the family Stethacanthidae, which possessed a flat brush-like dorsal fin with a patch of denticles on its top. Stethacanthus's unusual fin may have been used in mating rituals. Apart from the fins, Stethacanthidae resembled Falcatus (below).
Carbon- iferous	Falcatus	Falcatus is a genus of small cladodont-toothed cartilaginous fishes that lived 335–318 Ma. They were about 25–30 cm (10–12 in) long. They are characterised by the prominent fin spines that curved anteriorly over their heads.
Carbon- iferous	Belantsea	Belantsea is a representative of the Carboniferous to Permian order Petalodontiformes. Petalodontiforms are characterized by their peculiar teeth. The group became extinct in the late Permian (Wuchiapingian). One of the last survivors was Janassa, which superficially looked like modern rays, though it is not closely related with them.
Carbon- iferous	Orodus	Orodus is another cartilaginous fish of the Carboniferous, a genus from the family Orodontidae that lived into the early Permian from 303 to 295 Ma. It grew to 2 m (6.5 ft) in length.
Carbon- iferous	Chondrenchelys	Chondrenchelys is an extinct genus of cartilaginous fish from the Carboniferous period. It had an elongate, eel-like body. Chondrenchelys is a holocephalan and a distant relative of modern ratfishes.
Carbon- iferous	Edestus	Tooth whorl Edestus is a genus of the extinct eugeneodontid order, a group of cartilaginous fishes that is related with modern chimerids (ratfishes). Other Carboniferous genera aare Bobbodus, Campodus, and Ornithoprion. Eugeneodontids were common during the Carboniferous period. Members of this order typically had tooth whorls, mostly formed by their lower jaws. In Edestus, both the upper and lower jaws formed a tooth whorl. Some species of Edestus could reach body lengths of 6.7 m (22 ft).
Permian	Permian (298–252 Ma):	
Permian	Helicoprion	Tooth whorl Helicoprion is arguably the most iconic genus of the extinct Eugeneodontida. This order of cartilaginous fishes is related with extant chimerids (ratfishes). Eugeneodontids disappeared during the Permian period, with only a few genera surviving into the earliest Triassic (Caseodus, Fadenia). Typically, members of this group had tooth whorls. Species of Helicoprion could reach between 5 and 8 m (16.5 and 26 ft) in size.
Permian	Triodus	Triodus is a genus of xenacanthid cartilaginous fish. The order Xenacanthida existed during the Carboniferous to Triassic period, and is well known from many complete skeletons from the early Permian. They typically had a prominent dorsal fin spine, which in some species was attached to the back of their skull, while in others it was located more posteriorly. Xenacanthids were ferocious freshwater predators.
Permian	Acanthodes	Acanthodes is an extinct genus of spiny shark (Acanthodii). It had gills but no teeth, and was presumably a filter feeder. Acanthodes had only two skull bones and were covered in cubical scales. Each paired pectoral and pelvic fins had one spine, as did the single anal and dorsal fins, giving it a total of six spines, less than half that of many other spiny sharks. Acanthodians share qualities of both bony fish (osteichthyes) and cartilaginous fish (chondrichthyes), and it has been suggested that they may have been stem chondrichthyans and stem gnathostomes. Spiny sharks became extinct in the Permian.
Permian	Megalichthyids	Megalichthyids are an extinct family of lobe-finned fish. They are tetrapodomorphs, a group of lobe-finned fish that is closely related with land-living vertebrates. Megalichthyids survived into the Permian, but became extinct during this period. Palatinichthys from the early Permian of Germany was one of the last survivors of this clade.
Permian	Acrolepis	Acrolepis is a genus of palaeoniscoid ray-finned fish that existed during the Carboniferous to Triassic period. It had elongate jaws and its eyes were located in the front of the skull. Acrolepis had a heterocercal tail fin and fusiform body. The body was covered in thick ganoid scales. This morphology is typical for many late Palaeozoic ray-fins.
Permian	The Permian ended with the most extensive extinction event recorded in paleontology: the Permian-Triassic extinction event. 90% to 95% of marine species became extinct, as well as 70% of all land organisms. It is also the only known mass extinction of insects. Recovery from the Permian-Triassic extinction event was protracted; land ecosystems took 30M years to recover, and marine ecosystems took even longer. The impact of the end-Permian event on Bony fishes diversity remains elusive. It appears that there is no major diversity loss, but that can be the result of poor fossil record.	
Triassic	Triassic (252–201 Ma): The fish fauna of the Early Triassic was remarkably uniform, reflecting the fact that the surviving families dispersed globally after the Permian-Triassic extinction. A considerable radiation of ray-finned fishes occurred during the Triassic, laying the foundation for many modern fishes. See Category:Triassic fish.	
Triassic	Foreyia	Ticinepomis The Middle Triassic Foreyia, along with Ticinepomis, is one of the earliest known members of the family Latimeriidae, which also includes the extant coelacanth Latimeria. Foreyia had an atypical body shape for a coelacanth, a group that is otherwise known for their conservative morphology. Rebellatrix is another Triassic coelacanth with an aberrant morphology. This genus is characterized by a forked caudal fin, suggesting that Rebellatrix was a fast swimmer. Coelacanths had one of their highest post-Devonian diversity during the Early Triassic.
Triassic	Saurichthys	Gravid female Saurichthyiformes are an extinct clade of ray-finned fish that evolved shortly before the Permian-Triassic extinction, and that rapidly diversified after the event. The Triassic genus Saurichthys comprises over 50 species, some reaching up to 1.5 metres (4.9 ft) in length. Some Middle Triassic species show evidence for viviparity in the form of embryos that are preserved in females, and gonopodia in males. This is the earliest case of a viviparous ray-finned fish. Saurichthys was also the first ray-fin to show adaptations for ambush predation.
Triassic	Perleidus	Colobodus jaws Perleidus was a ray-finned fish from the Middle Triassic. About 15 centimetres (6 in) in length, it was a marine predatory fish with jaws that hung vertically under the braincase, allowing them to open wide. The Triassic Perleidiformes were very diverse in shape and showed distinct feeding specializations in their teeth. Colobodus, for example, had strong, button-like teeth. Some perleidiforms, such as Thoracopterus, were the first ray-fins to glide over water, much like extant flying fish, with which they are only distantly related.
Triassic	Robustichthys	Robustichthys is a Middle Triassic ionoscopiform ray-finned fish. They belong to the clade Halecomorphi, which were once diverse during the Mesozoic Era, but which are today represented by only a single species, the bowfin. Halecomorphs are holosteans, a clade which first appeared in the fossil record during the Triassic.
Triassic	Semionotus	Thick scales Semionotiformes are an extinct order of holostean ray-finned fish that existed from during the Mesozoic Era. They were characterized by thick scales and specialized jaws. They are relatives of modern gars, both belonging to the clade Ginglymodi. This clade first appears in the fossil record during the Triassic. Once diverse, they are only represented by a few species today.
Triassic	Pholidophorus	Pholidophorus was an extinct genus of teleost, around 40 centimetres (16 in) long, from about 240–140 Ma. Although not closely related to the modern herring, it was somewhat like herring in appearance and niche. It had a single dorsal fin, a symmetrical tail, and an anal fin placed towards the rear of the body. It had large eyes and was probably a fast swimming predator, hunting planktonic crustaceans and smaller fish. A very early teleost/teleosteomorph, Pholidophorus had many primitive characteristics such as ganoid scales and a spine that was partially composed of cartilage, rather than bone. Teleosts first appeared in the fossil record during the Triassic. One of the earliest members is Prohalecites (Ladinian).
Triassic	The Triassic ended with the Triassic–Jurassic extinction event. About 23% of all families, 48% of all genera (20% of marine families and 55% of marine genera) and 70% to 75% of all species became extinct. Ray-finned fishes, however, remained largely unaffected by this extinction event. Non-dinosaurian archosaurs continued to dominate aquatic environments, while non-archosaurian diapsids continued to dominate marine environments.	
Jurassic	Jurassic (201–145 Ma): During the Jurassic period, the primary vertebrates living in the seas were fish and marine reptiles. The latter include ichthyosaurs who were at the peak of their diversity, plesiosaurs, pliosaurs, and marine crocodiles of the families Teleosauridae and Metriorhynchidae. Numerous turtles could be found in lakes and rivers. See Category:Jurassic fish.	
Jurassic	Pachycormiformes	Hypsocormus Pachycormiformes are an extinct order of ray-finned fish that existed from the Early Jurassic to the K-Pg extinction (below). They were characterized by serrated pectoral fins, reduced pelvic fins and a bony rostrum. Their relations with other fish are unclear.
Jurassic	Leedsichthys	Along with its close pachycormid relatives Bonnerichthys and Rhinconichthys, Leedsichthys is part of a lineage of large-sized filter-feeders that swam the Mesozoic seas for over 100 million years, from the middle Jurassic until the end of the Cretaceous period. Pachycormids might represent an early branch of Teleostei, the group most modern bony fishes belong to; in that case Leedsichthys is the largest known teleost fish. In 2003, a fossil specimen 22 meters (72 feet) long was unearthed.
Jurassic	Ichthyodectiformes	This fossil Ichthyodectiform from the Lower Jurassic is one of the best conserved fossil fishes worldwide The order Ichthyodectiformes (literally "fish-biters") was a family of marine actinopterygian fish. They first appeared 156 Ma during the Late Jurassic and disappeared during the K-Pg extinction event 66 Ma. They were most diverse throughout the Cretaceous period. Most ichthyodectids ranged between 1 and 5 meters (3.5 and 16.5 ft) in length. All known taxa were predators, feeding on smaller fish; in several cases, larger Ichthyodectidae preyed on smaller members of the family. Some species had remarkably large teeth, though others, such as Gillicus arcuatus, had small ones and sucked in their prey. The largest Xiphactinus was 20 feet long, and appeared in the Late Cretaceous (below).
Cret- aceous	Cretaceous (145–66 Ma): See Category:Cretaceous fish.	
Cret- aceous	Sturgeon	True sturgeons appear in the fossil record during the Upper Cretaceous. Since that time, sturgeons have undergone remarkably little morphological change, indicating their evolution has been exceptionally slow and earning them informal status as living fossils. This is explained in part by the long generation interval, tolerance for wide ranges of temperature and salinity, lack of predators due to size, and the abundance of prey items in the benthic environment.
Cret- aceous	Cretoxyrhina	Cretoxyrhina mantelli was a large shark that lived about 100 to 82 million years ago, during the mid Cretaceous period. It is commonly known as the Ginsu Shark. This shark was first identified by a famous Swiss Naturalist, Louis Agassiz in 1843, as Cretoxyhrina mantelli. However, the most complete specimen of this shark was discovered in 1890, by the fossil hunter Charles H. Sternberg, who published his findings in 1907. The specimen consisted of a nearly complete associated vertebral column and over 250 associated teeth. This kind of exceptional preservation of fossil sharks is rare because a shark's skeleton is made of cartilage, which is not prone to fossilization. Charles dubbed the specimen Oxyrhina mantelli. This specimen represented a 20-foot-long (6.1 m) shark.
Cret- aceous	Enchodus	Enchodus is an extinct genus of bony fish. It flourished during the Upper Cretaceous and was small to medium in size. One of the genus' most notable attributes are the large "fangs" at the front of the upper and lower jaws and on the palatine bones, leading to its misleading nickname among fossil hunters and paleoichthyologists, "the saber-toothed herring". These fangs, along with a long sleek body and large eyes, suggest Enchodus was a predatory species.
Cret- aceous	Xiphactinus	External videos: Xiphactinus – YouTube; Xiphactinus is an extinct genus of large predatory marine bony fish of the Late Cretaceous. They grew more than 4.5 metres (15 feet) long.
Cret- aceous	Ptychodus	Ptychodus is a genus of extinct shark (previously considered as hybodontiformes but later denied) that lived from the late Cretaceous to the Paleogene. Ptychodus mortoni (pictured) was about 32 feet (9.8 metres) long and was unearthed in Kansas, United States.
Cret- aceous	The end of the Cretaceous was marked by the Cretaceous–Paleogene extinction event (K-Pg extinction). There are substantial fossil records of jawed fishes across the K–T boundary, which provides good evidence of extinction patterns of these classes of marine vertebrates. Within cartilaginous fish, approximately 80% of the sharks, rays, and skates families survived the extinction event, and more than 90% of teleost fish (bony fish) families survived. There is evidence of a mass kill of bony fishes at a fossil site immediately above the K–T boundary layer on Seymour Island near Antarctica, apparently precipitated by the K–Pg extinction event. However, the marine and freshwater environments of fishes mitigated environmental effects of the extinction event, and evidence shows that there was a major increase in size and abundance of teleosts immediately after the extinction, apparently due to the elimination of their ammonite competitors (there was no similar change in shark populations across the boundary).	
Cenozoic Era	Cenozoic Era (66 Ma to present): The current era has seen great diversification of bony fishes. Over half of all living vertebrate species (about 32,000 species) are fishes (non-tetrapod craniates), a diverse set of lineages that inhabit all the world's aquatic ecosystems, from snow minnows (Cypriniformes) in Himalayan lakes at elevations over 4,600 metres (15,100 feet) to flatfishes (order Pleuronectiformes) in the Challenger Deep, the deepest ocean trench at about 11,000 metres (36,000 feet). Fishes of myriad varieties are the main predators in most of the world's water bodies, both freshwater and marine.	
Cenozoic Era	Amphistium	Amphistium is a 50-million-year-old fossil fish that has been identified as an early relative of the flatfish, and as a transitional fossil. In a typical modern flatfish, the head is asymmetric with both eyes on one side of the head. In Amphistium, the transition from the typical symmetric head of a vertebrate is incomplete, with one eye placed near the top of the head.
Cenozoic Era	Otodus megalodon	External videos: Megalodon Giant Shark – National Geographic (full documentary); Megalodon battle History Channel; The Nightmarish Megalodon Discovery; Megalodon is an extinct species of shark that lived about 28 to 1.5 Ma. It looked much like a stocky version of the great white shark, but was much larger with estimated length reaching up to 20.3 metres (67 ft). Found in all oceans it was one of the largest and most powerful predators in vertebrate history, and probably had a profound impact on marine life.

== Sources ==
- Ahlberg, Per Erik (2001). Major events in early vertebrate evolution: palaeontology, phylogeny, genetics, and development. Washington, DC: Taylor & Francis. ISBN 978-0-415-23370-5. Archived from the original on 2016-06-16.
- Benton, Michael J (2005). Vertebrate Palaeontology.
- Dawkins, Richard (2004). The Ancestor's Tale: A Pilgrimage to the Dawn of Life. Boston: Houghton Mifflin Company. ISBN 978-0-618-00583-3.
- Donoghue, P. C.; Forey, P. L.; Aldridge, R. J. (2000). "Conodont affinity and chordate phylogeny". Biological Reviews of the Cambridge Philosophical Society. 75 (2): 191–251. doi:10.1111/j.1469-185X.1999.tb00045.x. PMID 10881388. S2CID 22803015.
- Hall, Brian Keith; Hanken, James (1993). The Skull. Chicago: University of Chicago Press. ISBN 978-0-226-31568-3. Archived from the original on 2016-05-20.
- Janvier, Philippe (2003). Early Vertebrates. Oxford University Press. ISBN 978-0-19-852646-9.
- Long, John A. (1996). The Rise of Fishes: 500 Million Years of Evolution. Johns Hopkins University Press. ISBN 0-8018-5438-5.
- Palmer, D., ed. (1999). The Marshall Illustrated Encyclopedia of Dinosaurs and Prehistoric Animals. London: Marshall Editions. p. 26. ISBN 978-1-84028-152-1.
- Palmer, D. (2000). The Atlas of the Prehistoric World. Philadelphia: Marshall Publishing Ltd.
- Sarjeant, William Antony S.; Halstead, L. B. (1995). Vertebrate fossils and the evolution of scientific concepts: writings in tribute to Beverly Halstead. Gordon and Breach. ISBN 978-2-88124-996-9. Archived from the original on 2017-02-16.
- Turner, S. (1999). "Early Silurian to Early Devonian thelodont assemblages and their possible ecological significance". In A. J. Boucot; J. Lawson (eds.). Palaeocommunities, International Geological Correlation Programme 53, Project Ecostratigraphy, Final Report. Cambridge University Press.
