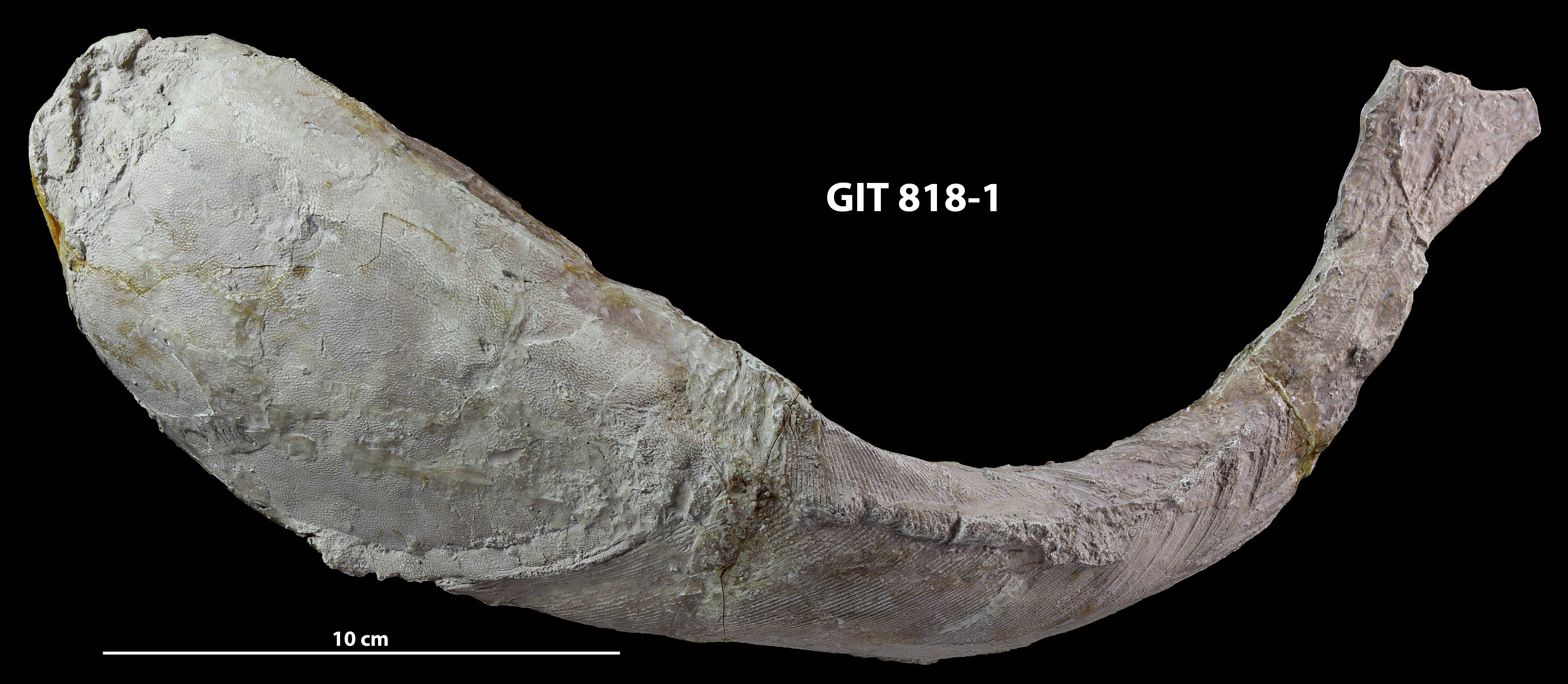
- Cast (replica) of a Sacabambaspis fossil

Scientific classification
- Kingdom: Animalia
- Phylum: Chordata
- Infraphylum: Agnatha
- Class: †Pteraspidomorpha
- Order: †Arandaspidiformes
- Family: †Arandaspididae
- Genus: †Sacabambaspis; Gagnier, Blieck & Rodrigo, 1986

Type species
- †Sacabambaspis janvieri Gagnier, Blieck & Rodrigo, 1986

Species
- S. janvieri Gagnier, Blieck & Rodrico, 1986

= Sacabambaspis =

Sacabambaspis Temporal range: Middle to Late Ordovician (Llanvirn–Sandbian), ~468–453 Ma

Extinct genus of jawless fishes

Sacabambaspis is an extinct genus of armored jawless fish ("ostracoderm") which lived in the Ordovician period. Sacabambaspis inhabited shallow waters on the continental margins of the southern supercontinent Gondwana. The most complete specimens have been found in Bolivia, while armor fragments are also known from Argentina, Australia, and Oman. Sacabambaspis vaguely resembles a slender tadpole, with an oversized armor-plated head, flat body, and no discernible fins outside of its narrow tail. The eyes are closely spaced and positioned at the very front of the head, akin to car headlamps. It was about 35 cm (13 3/4 inches) long in total, including its distinctively thin scaly tail.

With many well-preserved specimens, Sacabambaspis is the best-known member of Arandaspida, a group of jawless fish found only in the Ordovician of Gondwana. Arandaspids were among the earliest members of the class Pteraspidomorpha, alongside a far more diverse group of jawless fish, the Silurian–Devonian heterostracans.

== History ==
=== Bolivian specimens ===
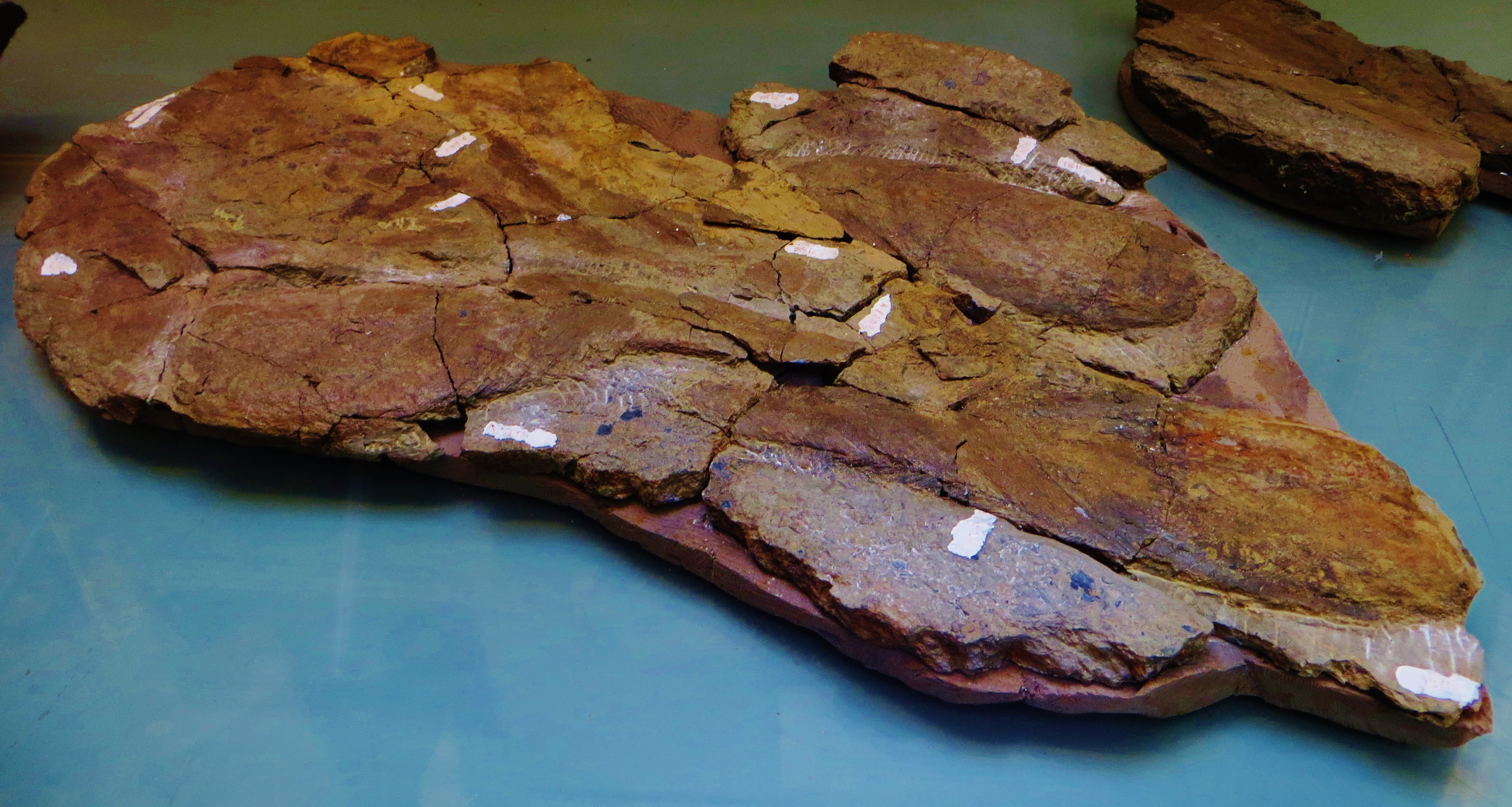
A bonebed of Sacabambaspis fossils, displayed at Musée d'Histoire Naturelle, Paris.

Sacabambaspis is named after the village of Sacabamba, Cochabamba Department, Bolivia, where the first fossils of the genus were found. S. janvieri, the type species of the genus, is known from the Anzaldo Formation of Bolivia.

Sacabambaspis janvieri was first described by Gagnier, Blieck & Rodrico (1986), based on a few armor fragments. Further discoveries in the late 1980s and early 1990s greatly expanded the list of specimens. Later studies in the mid-2000s cleared up a few remaining points of ambiguity regarding its armor structure and tail anatomy.

Over 30 specimens have been found in Bolivia, all crammed into a very confined area. Their close arrangement is believed to be the result of a fish kill, probably due a sudden inflow of fresh water and sediments from a large storm. They were found associated with a large number of lingulid brachiopods, also killed at the same time.

=== Other specimens ===
Indeterminate specimens (described as "Sacabambaspis sp.") have been found in many countries corresponding to the margin of Gondwana. Young (1997) described fossils of the genus from the Stokes Siltstone and Carmichael Sandstone of Central Australia, the latter of which is dated to the Eastonian (corresponding to the Katian age). Specimens have also been reported from Argentina.

Sansom et al. (2009) described specimens from the Amdeh Formation of Oman on the Arabian Peninsula. The Oman discoveries showed that the fish were present all around the periphery of the ancient continent of Gondwana, and not just in the southern regions as had previously been shown by the findings from South America and Australia. The layers in Oman containing Sacabambaspis may be as old as the late Dapingian or early Darriwilian stages of the Middle Ordovician (roughly 470 million years ago). By comparison, the South American and Australian fossils are equivalent to the historical Llanvirn–Caradoc series (late Darriwilian to early Sandbian stages), persisting into the Late Ordovician (roughly 458 million years ago).

=== Internet attention ===
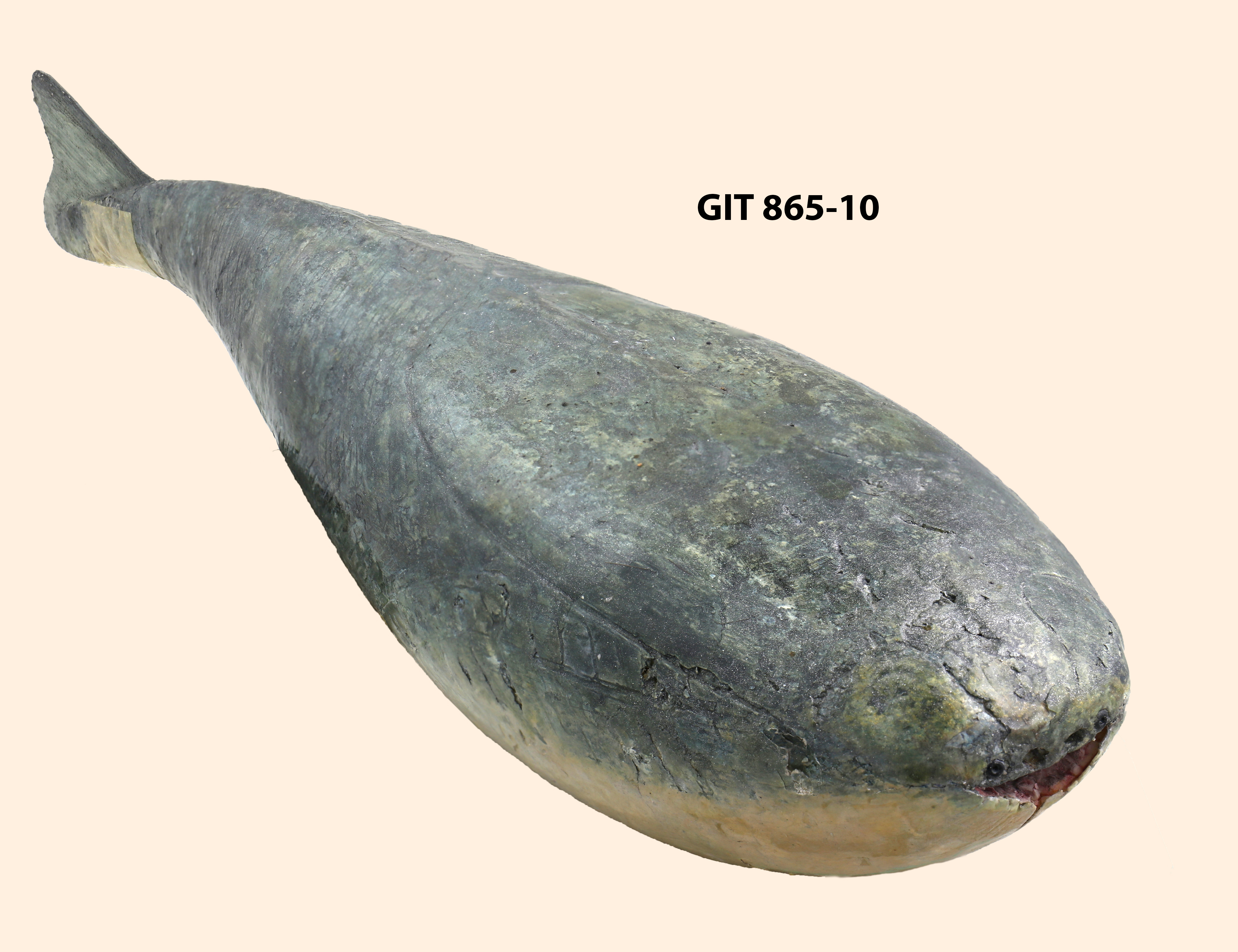
A Sacabambaspis model created by Elga Mark-Kurik, very similar to her memetic 1995 model on exhibit in Helsinki. The simple tail fin does not factor in newer research by Pradel et al. (2006).

A Sacabambaspis model exhibited at the Natural History Museum of Helsinki in Finland became a source of internet memes and fan art in June 2023, following a viral tweet from August 2022. The Helsinki model of Sacabambaspis (サカバンバスピス) is a particularly popular subject in Japan, where it receives a level of attention akin to yuru-kyara (cute promotional mascots).

The prehistoric fish models on display at the Natural History Museum of Helsinki are the work of Estonian paleontologist Elga Mark-Kurik (1928–2016), who the museum asked to design their 1995 fossil fish exhibit. Mark-Kurik was not an artist by trade, and her models were entirely made from scratch. The exhibited models are made of silicone (copied from a sculpted foam template), with added doll eyes purchased at a nearby craft store.

== Description ==
Sacabambaspis averages around 35 cm (13 3/4 inches) in total length, with the head shield about 10 cm (4 inches) long and 8 cm (3 1/4 inches) wide.

=== Head shield ===
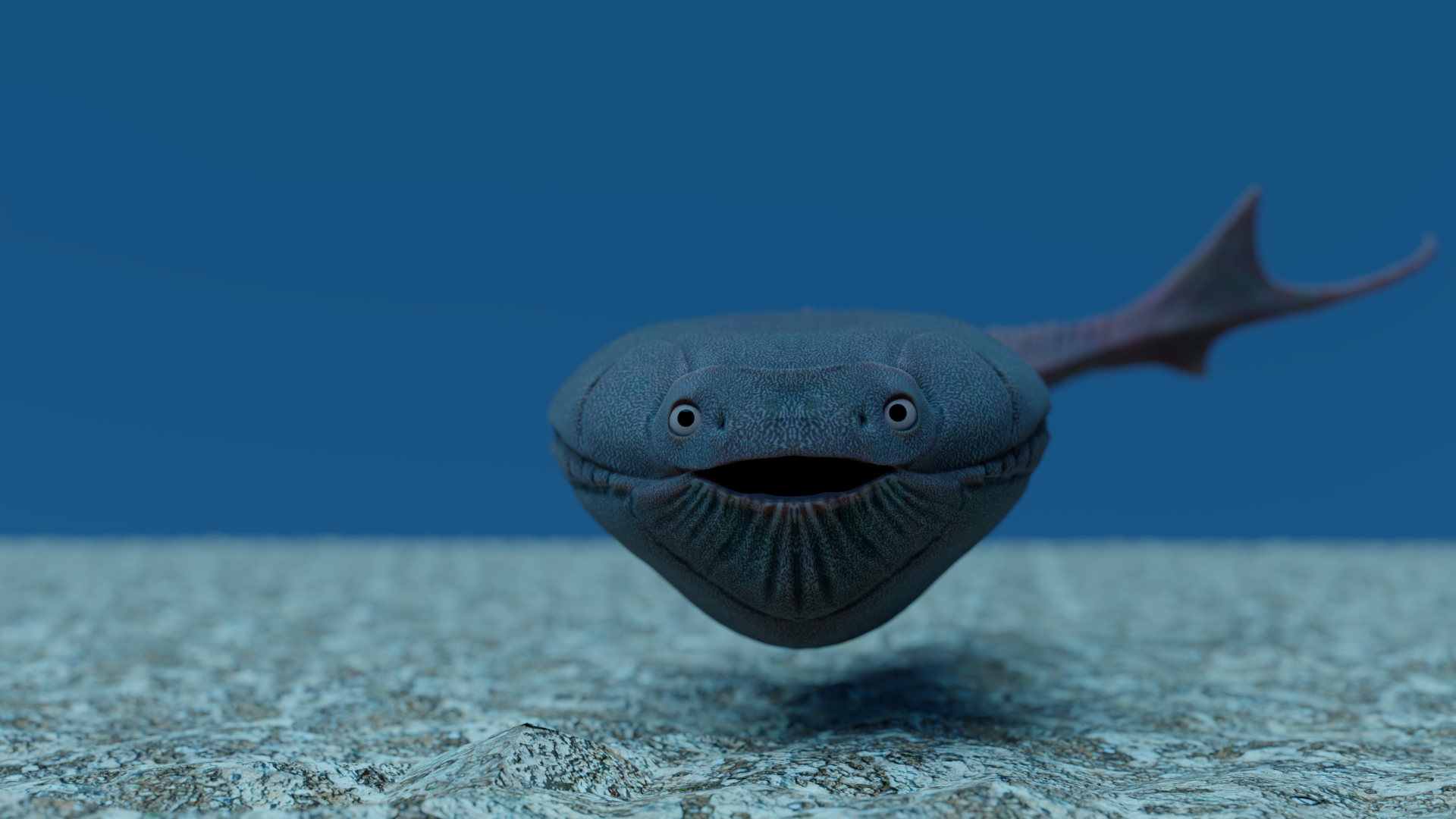
A life restoration of Sacabambaspis as seen from the front.

The head of Sacabambaspis is covered in large plates of armor. Two armor plates are particularly large: an upper (dorsal) plate, mostly flat beyond a slight ridge near the back, and a lower (ventral) plate which is deeply convex at the front. This headshield is ornamented with characteristic oak leaf-shaped tubercles (raised areas). The shields probably evolved from a mosaic of many tiny platelets, fused together at their lowest layer. A few early heterostracans (such as Tesseraspis and Lepidaspis) have tubercles of a similar shape, though in an unfused format. The side of the head has a curved row of diamond-shaped branchial plates, which separate the dorsal and ventral plates. The branchial plates most likely covered a series of gill openings.

The eyes are reinforced by scleral rings and are positioned far forward, at the very front of the head. The jawless mouth is a narrow slit, with its lower "lip" a broad bundle of thin scaly strips. The space between the mouth and eye sockets is covered by a T-shaped plate. The gaps between the median T-shaped plate and the eye sockets may have held a pair of nostrils, each right next to an eye. The forward-positioned eyes of Sacabambaspis mean that its brain must have been further back in the head. This feature may not have been typical in the Paleozoic. Galeaspids, some placoderms, and Eriptychius, for example, had widely-spaced eyes with the brain filling in the entire front of the head.

The sensory system of Sacabambaspis was not limited to eyes and nostrils: a pair of small pits near the front of the dorsal shield may represent pineal and parapineal organs. Arandaspids appear to be the only vertebrates with paired pineal-parapineal organs. Shallow lateral lines (sensory grooves) cover the headshield. The dorsal shield has a pair of intermittent grooves along its length, plus a complete loop behind each eye. The ventral shield has a pair of lateral lines extending down from the edge of the mouth.

The armor of Sacabambaspis has a three-layer internal structure. The lowest layer is horizontal plate-like bone and the thick middle layer is cancellous (spongy) bone. The upper layer is formed of fibrous dentine capped by hardened enameloid, the same tissues which form the scales and teeth of sharks. The external armor tubercles correspond to the dentine-enamel layer. The three armor layers of Sacabambaspis are similar to the armor of heterostracans and astraspids. The walls of the spongy middle layer are porous, with small spaces which may have hosted either bone fibers (like heterostracans and astraspids) or osteocytes (internal bone cells).

=== Body and tail ===
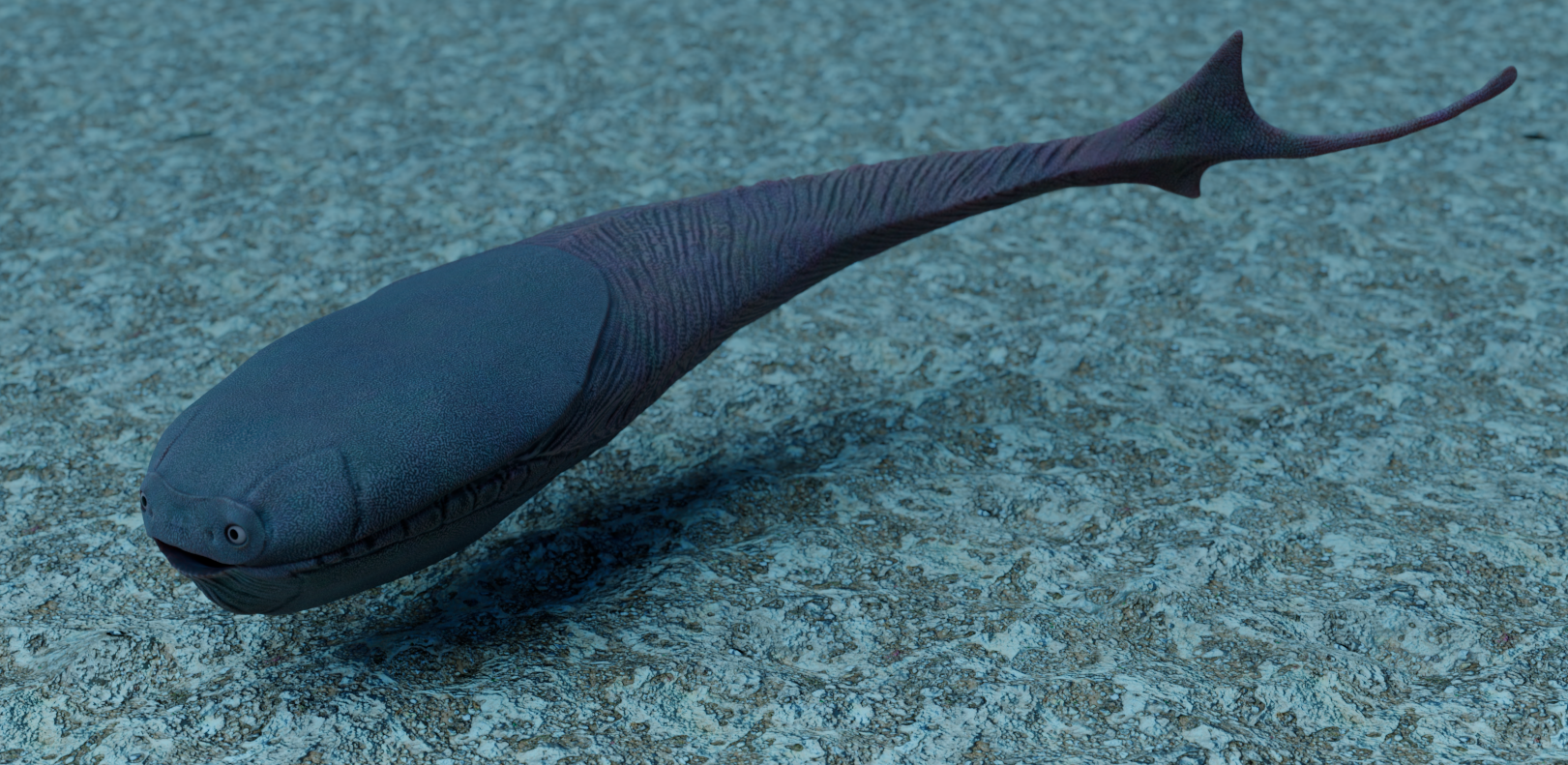
A life restoration of Sacabambaspis, with a thin, specialized tail, reflecting the conclusions of Pradel et al. (2006).

Behind the armored head, the rest of the body is covered by much narrower scales, each bearing a line of oak leaf-shaped tubercles similar to those of the head shields. One series of scales forms a ridge down the upper edge of the body, and another ridge of scales extends along most of the lower edge. Strap-like scales converge towards the middle of each flank, forming a chevron (V-shaped) pattern when seen from the side. The paired lateral lines of the ventral shield extend beyond the head, marking scales on the lower half of the body about 2/3 as far as the tail.

The tail of Sacabambaspis is one of its most distinctive features, though the exact details were debated for many years. Based on the best-preserved specimen, MHNC 1182, Gagnier (1989) reconstructed the tail as a whip-like scaly tube surrounding the spinal cord, with small symmetrical fins at its base. Most subsequent publications placed doubt on this "rat-tail" reconstruction, which was unprecedented among jawless fish. Instead, they argued that its tail was short and leaf-shaped, with the longer string of scales simply misplaced armor from a nearby specimen.

A 2006 study supported Gagnier's original interpretation, recognizing the thin scaly tail as a valid feature of MHNC 1182. The webbing of the tail fin web is supported by extremely thin scales, split into an upper and lower portion, plus a small patch of webbing at the very tip of the tail. The upper fin web was probably the largest in the tail, though there is some room for interpretation considering the tail is strongly twisted in the fossil. The lower fin web may be equivalent to an anal fin. The tail fin of Sacabambaspis, though unique in its details, can broadly be classified as hypocercal. This means that the spinal cord bends down in the tail, with most of the fin webbing above it, like many other extinct and living jawless fish groups. Heterostracans appear to have a more symmetrical tail, though without a clear axis for the spinal cord.

== Classification ==
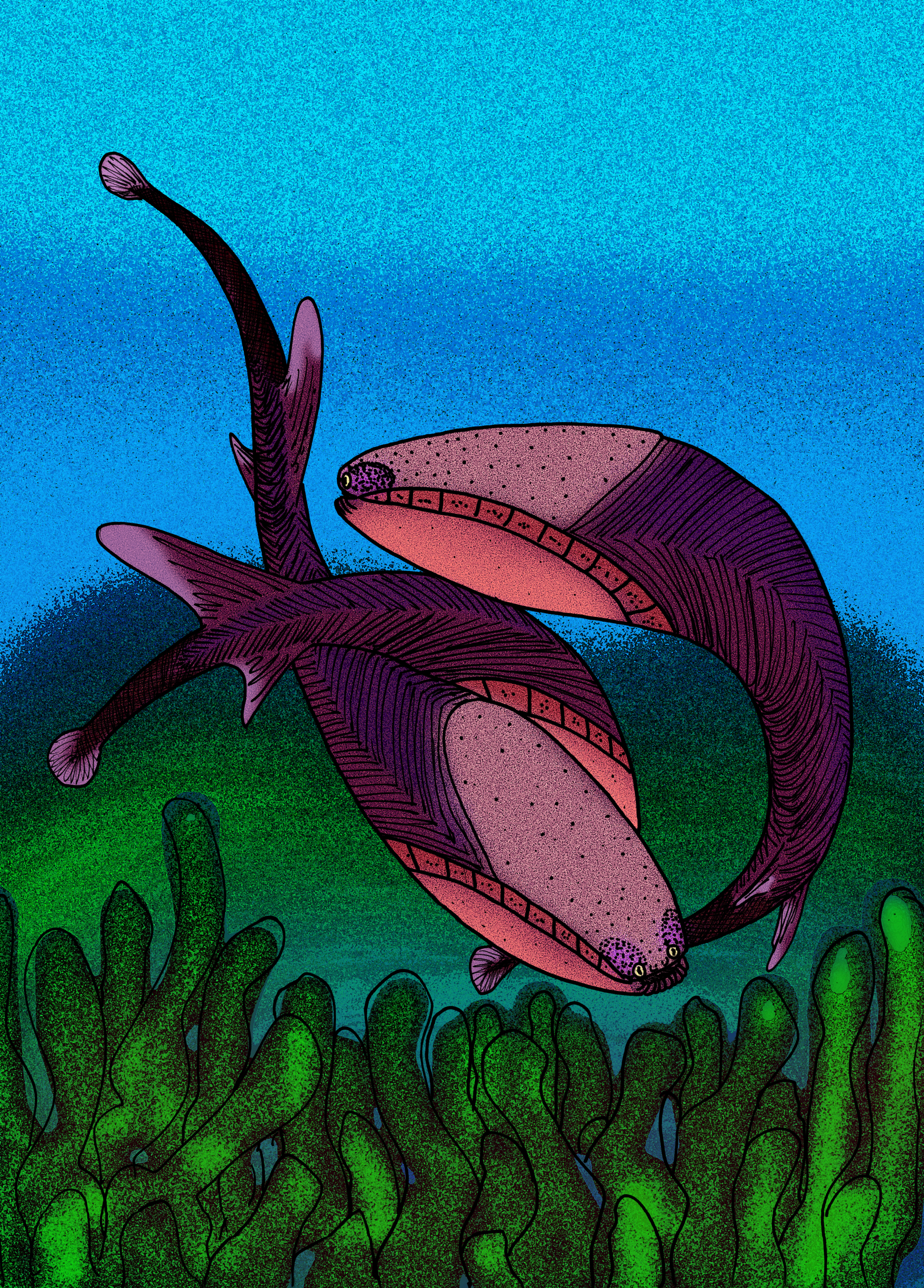
A life restoration of several Sacabambaspis with a thin, specialized tail, reflecting the conclusions of Pradel et al. (2006).

There were many types of jawless fish in Paleozoic seas, with countless variations on body types and the arrangement of fins, armor, and other organs. Jawless fish are technically known as "agnathans" while extinct armored jawless fish are called "ostracoderms". These terms are purely categorical, paleontologists no longer use them in the context of evolutionary relationships. Some "ostracoderms" are more closely related to jawed fish (gnathostomes), others closer to living jawless fish (hagfish and lampreys), and others have no close living relatives.

Sacabambaspis is the best-known member of Arandaspida, a group of armored jawless fish endemic to the Ordovician of Gondwana. Arandaspids are all very similar to each other, only differing in subtle aspects of their armor texture. They were closely related to two other groups: the astraspids (from Ordovician Laurentia, the core of modern North America) and heterostracans (Silurian-Devonian, worldwide). All three groups had several traits in common: large dorsal and ventral head shields (or a mosaic of armor in their place), a characteristic set of internal layers in the armor, and no fins apart from the tail fin. Arandaspids, astraspids, and heterostracans are collectively known as pteraspidomorphs. The most fundamental physical difference between the rare Ordovician species and the extremely diverse heterostracans is that heterostracans condense their gill openings into only two holes, one on each side of the head.

Pteraspidomorphs are probably a clade, meaning that they are most closely related to each other and not ancestral to any non-pteraspidomorph fish. The most comprehensive study on pteraspidomorph relationships is by Randle et al. (2025). The result of their maximum parsimony analysis is shown below:

- Pteraspidomorphi
  - - Astraspis
    - Eriptychius
  - - Arandaspida
      - Sacabambaspis
      - Arandaspis
    - Heterostraci
      - Amphiaspidida
      - - Natlaspis
        - - "Traquairaspis" mackenziensis
          - - - Corveolepis
              - Cyathaspidida
            - - - "Corveolepis" elgae
                - - Aporemaspis
                  - Aserotaspis
                  - Oniscolepis
                  - Kallostrakon
                  - - Lepidaspis
                    - Tesseraspis
                  - Cardipeltis
              - - Corvaspis
                - Traquairaspidida
                - Pteraspidiformes (including Psammosteida)

== Paleobiology ==
=== Feeding ===
Although it was jawless, the mouth of Sacabambaspis janvieri was lined with nearly 60 rows of small bony oral plates which were probably movable in order to provide more efficient suction feeding through expansion and contraction of the oral cavity and pharynx.

=== Sensory system ===
The fossils of Sacabambaspis show clear evidence of a sensory structure (lateral line system). This is a line of canal pores, within each of which are open nerve endings that can detect slight movements in the water, produced for example by predators. The arrangement of these organs in regular lines allows the fish to detect the direction and distance from which a disturbance in the water is coming.

== See also ==
- Arandaspida
