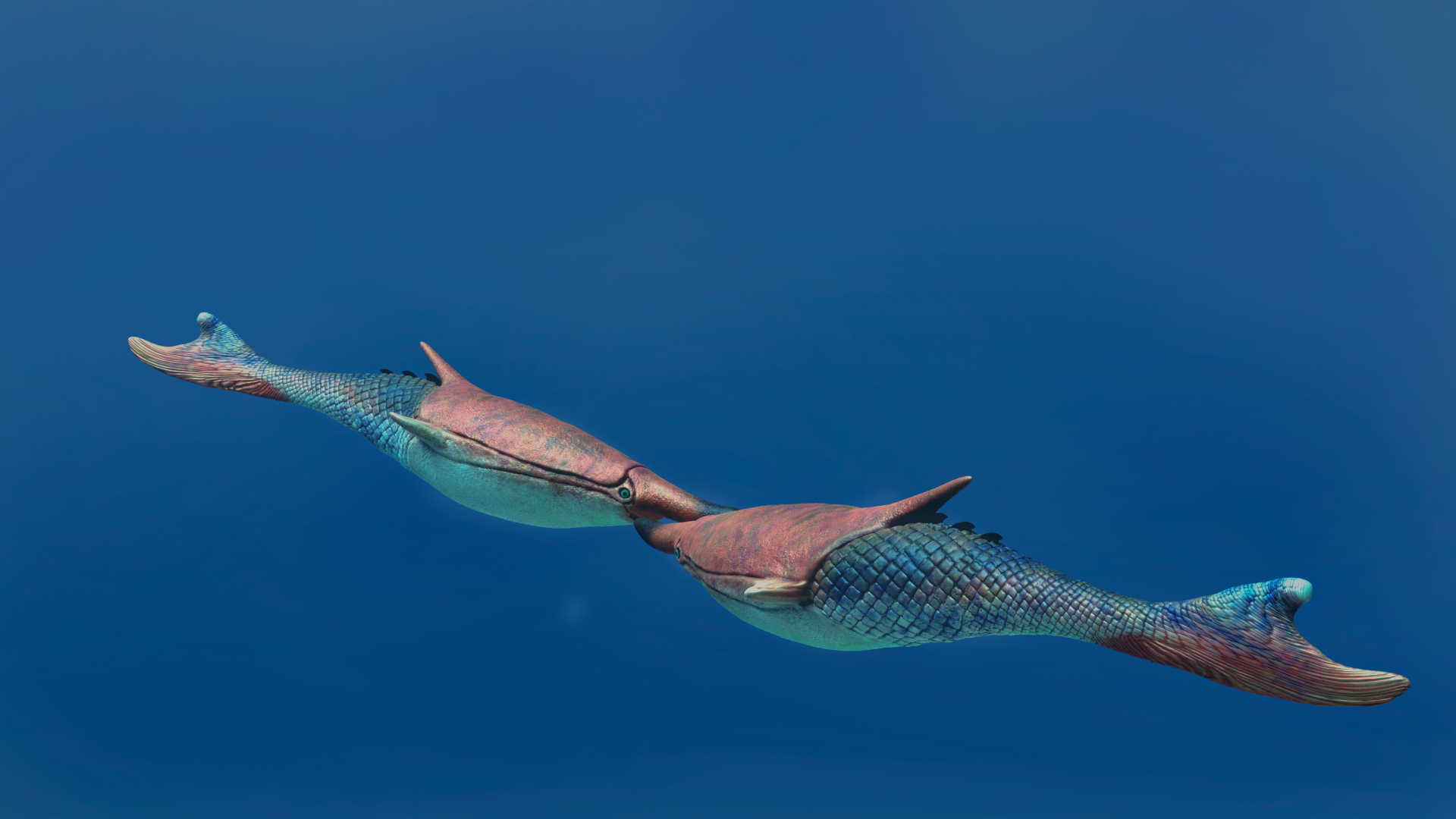
- Pteraspis (Heterostraci)
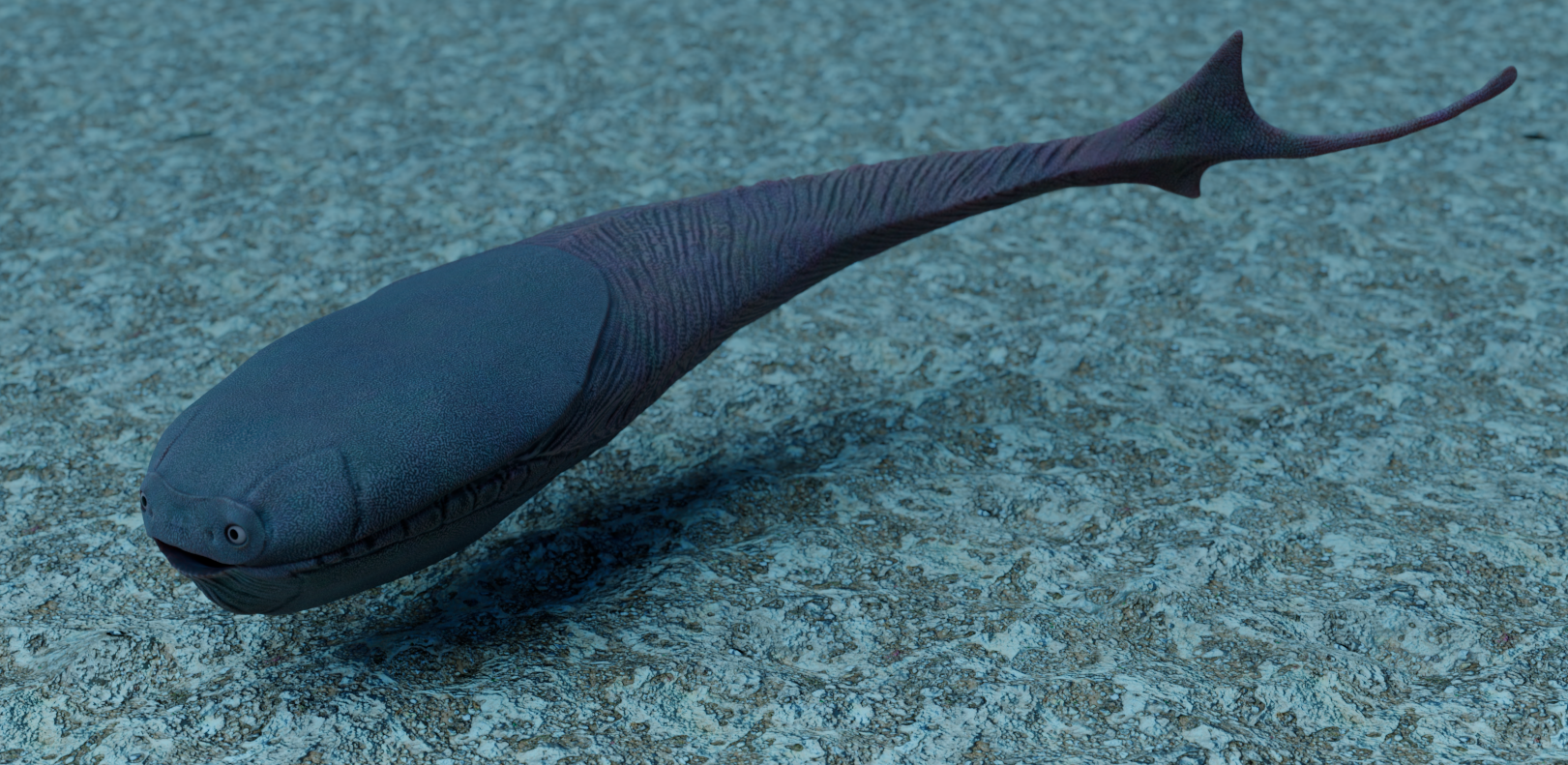
- Sacabambaspis (Arandaspida)

Scientific classification
- Kingdom: Animalia
- Phylum: Chordata
- Infraphylum: Agnatha
- Class: †Pteraspidomorpha; Goodrich, 1909

Type species
- †Pteraspis rostrata Agassiz, 1835

Subgroups
- †Arandaspida; †Astraspida; †Eriptychiida; †Heterostraci

= Pteraspidomorpha =

Pteraspidomorphs Temporal range: Early Ordovician to Late Devonian

Extinct class of jawless fishes

Pteraspidomorpha (also frequently spelled Pteraspidomorphi) is an extinct class of early jawless fish. They have long been regarded as closely related or even ancestral to jawed vertebrates, but the few characteristics they share with the latter are now considered as basal traits for all vertebrates.

== Characteristics ==
Pteraspidomorphs are characterized by their massive dermal head armour having large, median, ventral and dorsal plates or shields.

The fossils show extensive shielding of the head. Many had hypocercal tails in order to generate lift to increase ease of movement through the water for their armoured bodies, which were covered in dermal bone. They also had sucking mouth parts and some species may have lived in fresh water.

Most pteraspidomorphs were marine, but lived very near to the shore, in lagoons and deltas. Some groups are thought to have been fresh water-dwelling. They were certainly bottom-dwellers, as shown by traces of abrasion of the ventral surfaces of their headshields.

== Classification ==
Pteraspidomorphs have been first regarded as related to bony fishes, then to sharks, then ancestral to hagfishes, and finally as the closest jawless relatives of the gnathostomes.

This last theory was based on the fact that they seem to have a paired olfactory organ and a sensory-line pattern which is quite similar to that of the gnathostomes. These characteristics are, however, likely to be general for either the vertebrates or, at any rate, for the ensemble of all ostracoderms and the gnathostomes. Other ostracoderms, such as the Galeaspida are now known to have a paired olfactory organ. Current phylogenetic analysis using a large number of characteristics now place pteraspidomorphs as the sister-group of all other ostracoderms and the gnathostomes.

=== Phylogeny ===
Based on the work of Mikko Haaramo:

- Pteraspidomorphi
  - Anatolepis
  - - Arandaspida
      Arandaspidiformes
    - Heterostracomorphi
      - Astraspida
        - Astraspidiformes
        - Tesakoviaspidiformes
      - - Eriptychiida
          Eriptychiiformes
        - Heterostraci
          - Tesseraspidiformes
          - - †Traquairaspidiformes
            - - Tolypelepidiformes
              - - Cyathaspidiformes
                - Pteraspidiformes

The most comprehensive study on pteraspidomorph relationships is by Randle et al. (2025). The result of their maximum parsimony analysis is shown below:

- Pteraspidomorpha
  - - Astraspis
    - Eriptychius
  - - Arandaspida
      - Sacabambaspis
      - Arandaspis
    - Heterostraci
      - Amphiaspidida
      - - Natlaspis
        - - "Traquairaspis" mackenziensis
          - - - Corveolepis
              - Cyathaspidida
            - - - "Corveolepis" elgae
                - - Aporemaspis
                  - Aserotaspis
                  - Oniscolepis
                  - Kallostrakon
                  - - Lepidaspis
                    - Tesseraspis
                  - Cardipeltis
              - - Corvaspis
                - Traquairaspidida
                - Pteraspidiformes (including Psammosteida)

Phylogeny of jawless fish after Reeves and colleagues, 2023:

- Vertebrata total group
  - †Haikouella
  - - †Metaspriggina
    - †Myllokunmingiida
    - Vertebrata crown group
      - Cyclostomi total group
        - †Anaspida
          - †Birkeniida
          - - †Lasanius
            - - †Jamoytius
              - †Euphanerops
        - - †Euconodonta
          - Cyclostomi crown group
            - Myxinoidea
            - Petromyzontida
      - Gnathostomata total group
        - †Pteraspidomorphi
          - †Astraspis
          - - †Arandaspida
            - †Heterostraci
        - - †Thelodonti
            - †Furcacaudiformes
            - †Thelodontiformes
          - - †Pituriaspida
            - - †Galeaspida
              - - †Osteostraci
                - Gnathostomata (traditional usage)
                  - †Antiarchi
                  - - †Arthrodira
                    - Gnathostomata crown group
                      - Osteichthyes
                      - Chondrichthyes

== See also ==
- Ostracoderm
