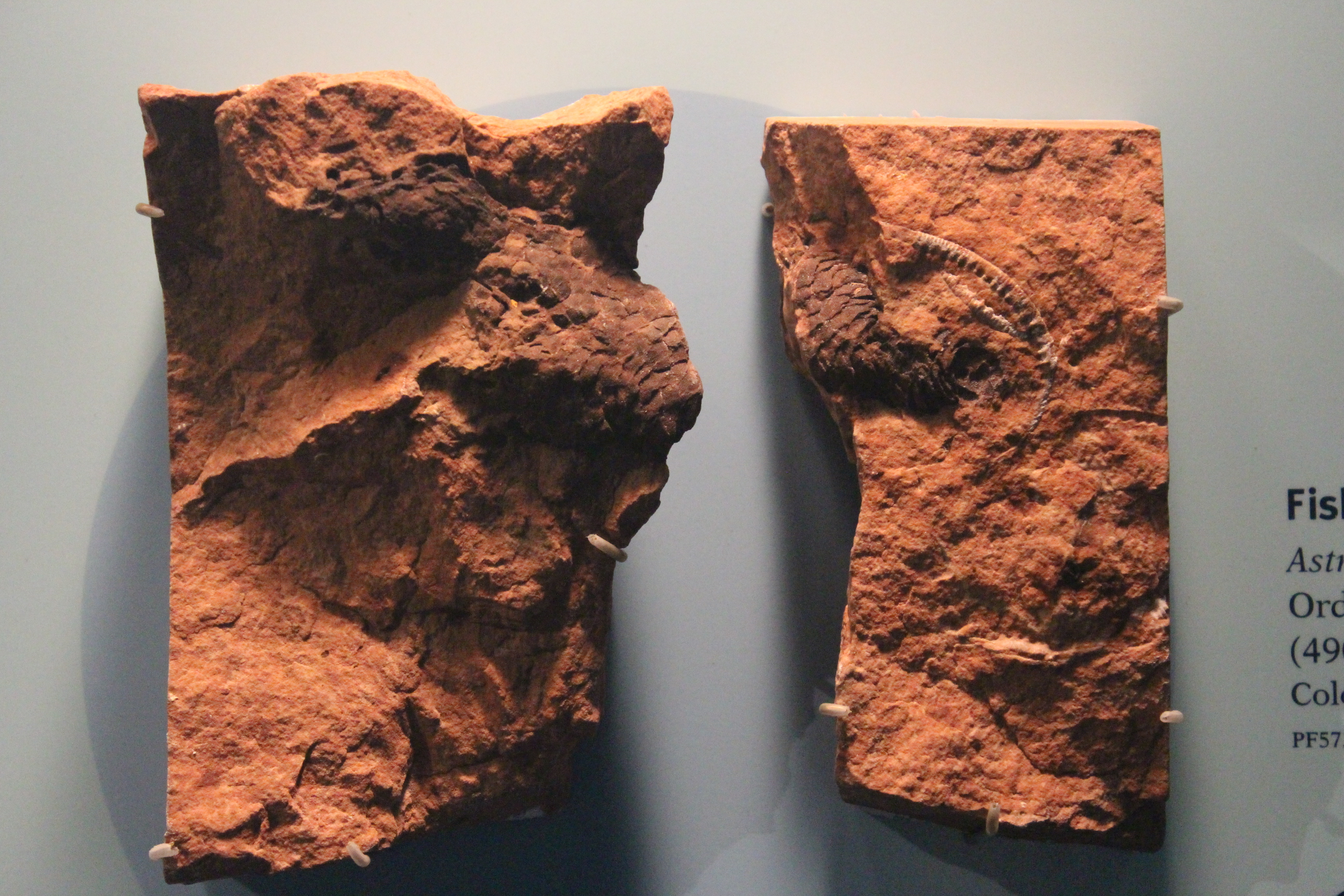
- Fossil specimen of A. desiderata, Field Museum of Natural History
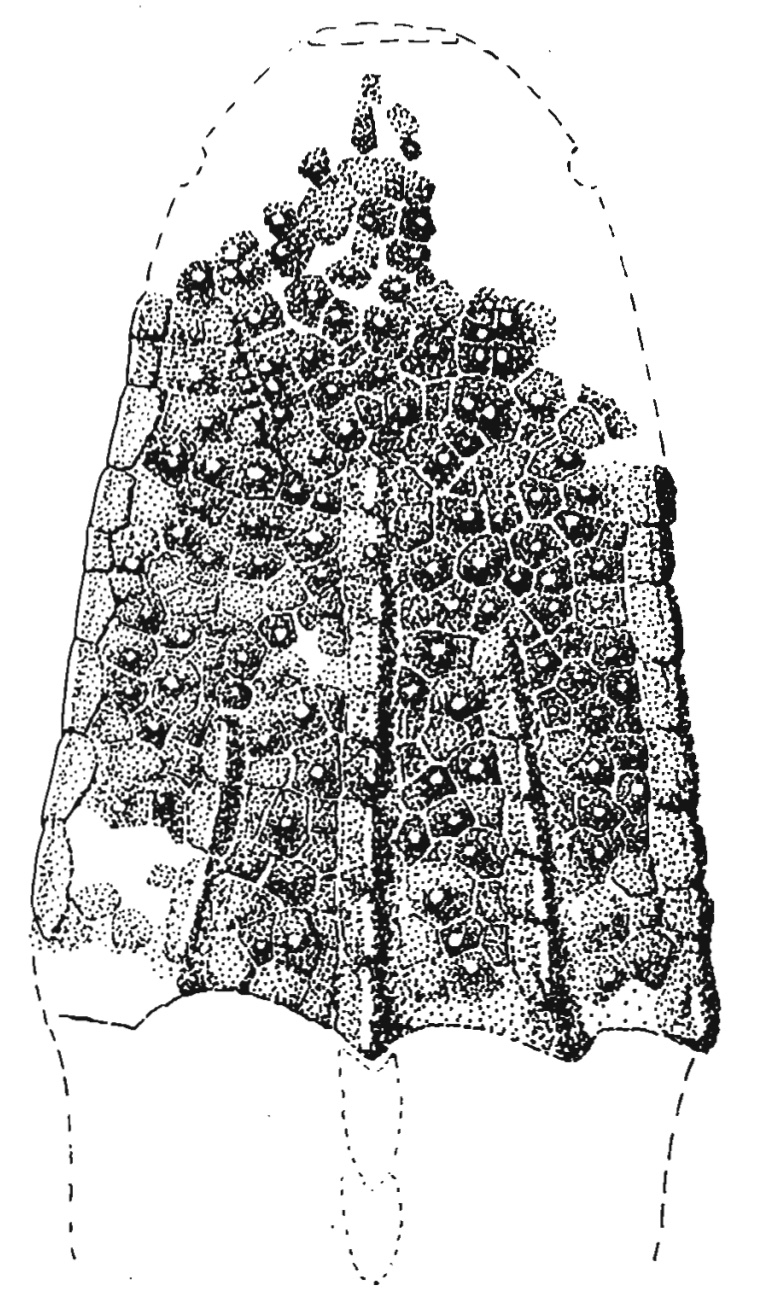
- Reconstruction of head shield of A. desiderata

Scientific classification
- Kingdom: Animalia
- Phylum: Chordata
- Infraphylum: Agnatha
- Class: †Pteraspidomorpha
- Subclass: †Heterostraci
- Order: †Pteraspidiformes
- Genus: †Astraspis; Walcott, 1892

Type species
- Astraspis desiderata Walcott 1892

Synonyms
- †Pycnaspis splendens Ørvig 1958; †Astraspis splendens (Ørvig 1958) Smith, Sansom & Smith 1995

= Astraspis =

Astraspis Temporal range: 467–443 Ma middle-late Ordovician

Extinct genus of jawless fishes

Astraspis ('star shield') is an extinct, monotypic genus of primitive jawless fish from the Ordovician of Central North America including the Harding Sandstone of Colorado and Bighorn Mountains of Wyoming. It is also known from Bolivia. It is related to other Ordovician fishes, such as the South American Sacabambaspis, and the Australian Arandaspis.

== Description ==
Life restoration of A. desiderata

Nearly complete fossils suggest the living animals were about 20 cm (7.9 in) in length. The body had a mobile tail covered with small protective plate-like scales of less than 1 mm (0.039 in) and a forebody covered with plate-like scales larger than 2 mm (0.079 in). The specimen from North America (described by Sansom et al., 1997) had relatively large, laterally-positioned eyes and a series of eight gill openings on each side. The specimen was generally oval in cross-section. The protective bony plates covering the animal were composed of aspidin (chemically similar to a modern shark's teeth), covered by tubercles composed of dentine. It is from these tubercles (which are generally star-shaped) that the name "Astraspis" (literally "star-shield") is derived. The histology of Astraspis desiderata was unique. Its hard tissues were made up of irregular soft tissue gaps and a basal component of spongy aspidin with extensive trabeculae. As is typical of Astraspis, the individual tubercles were composed of dentine with an enameloid cover, which contains a high density of parallel, fine-calibrated tapered tubules.

== Other sources ==
Michael J. Benton, Vertebrate Palaeontology, 3rd edition, 2005
