= Aserotaspis =

Scientific classification
- Domain: Eukaryota
- Kingdom: Animalia
- Phylum: Chordata
- Infraphylum: Agnatha
- Class: †Pteraspidomorpha
- Subclass: †Heterostraci
- Genus: †Aserotaspis; Elliott & Loeffler, 1976

Type species
- Aserotaspis canadensis Elliott & Loeffler, 1976

Extinct genus of jawless fishes

Aserotaspis is an extinct genus of jawless fish which existed in what is now northern Canada. It was first named by Dineley and Loeffler in 1976, and contains the species Aserotaspis canadensis.
