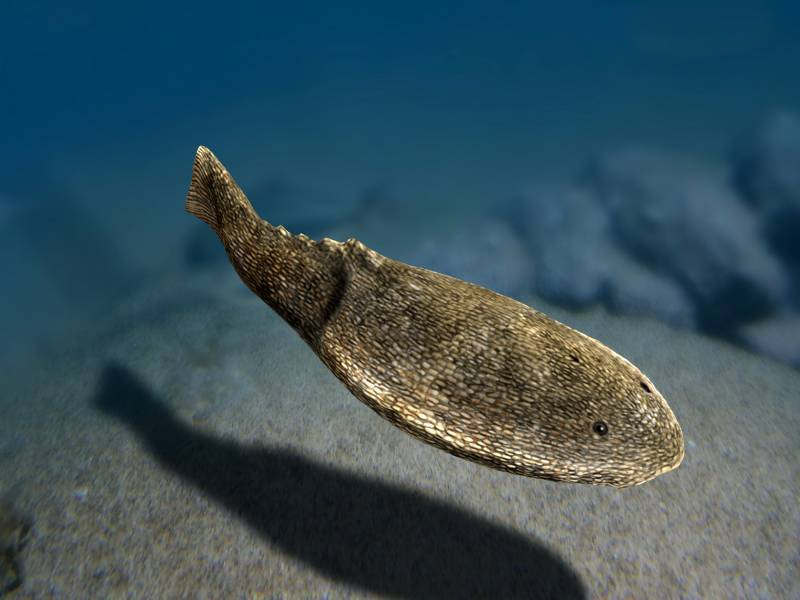

Scientific classification
- Domain: Eukaryota
- Kingdom: Animalia
- Phylum: Chordata
- Infraphylum: Agnatha
- Class: †Pteraspidomorpha
- Subclass: †Heterostraci
- Order: †Lepidaspidiformes
- Family: †Lepidaspididae
- Genus: †Lepidaspis; Dineley & Loeffler 1976

Species
- L. serrata Dineley & Loeffler 1976

= Lepidaspis =

Lepidaspis Temporal range: Early Devonian

Extinct genus of jawless fishes

Lepidaspis serrata ("serrated scaly shield") is an extinct heterostracan jawless fish from Early Devonian Canada. Its scientific name refers to the fact that the armor is composed of hundreds of tiny scales with serrated edges.

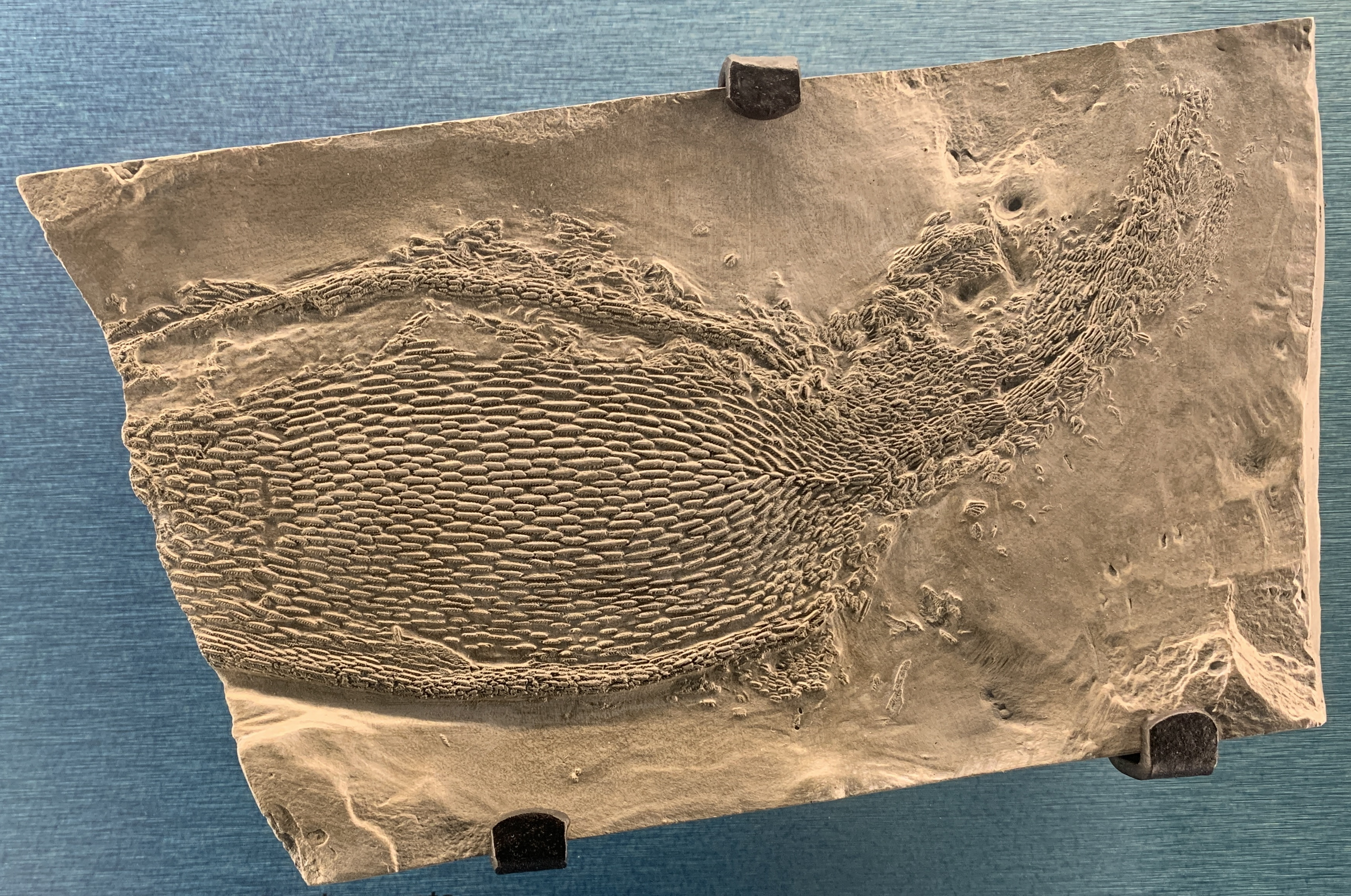
Lepidaspis serrata cast. Mackenzie Mountains, Northwest Territories (Canada). At the Royal Tyrrell Museum of Palaeontology.

Although it is regarded as a heterostracan, its exact placement within Heterostraci is regarded as incertae sedis, as the fact that it is currently impossible to discern where its dorsal and ventral plates (which are made up of a mosaic of the aforementioned tiny scales) end or begin. Some experts regard it as being descended from the basal heterostracans of the Silurian.
