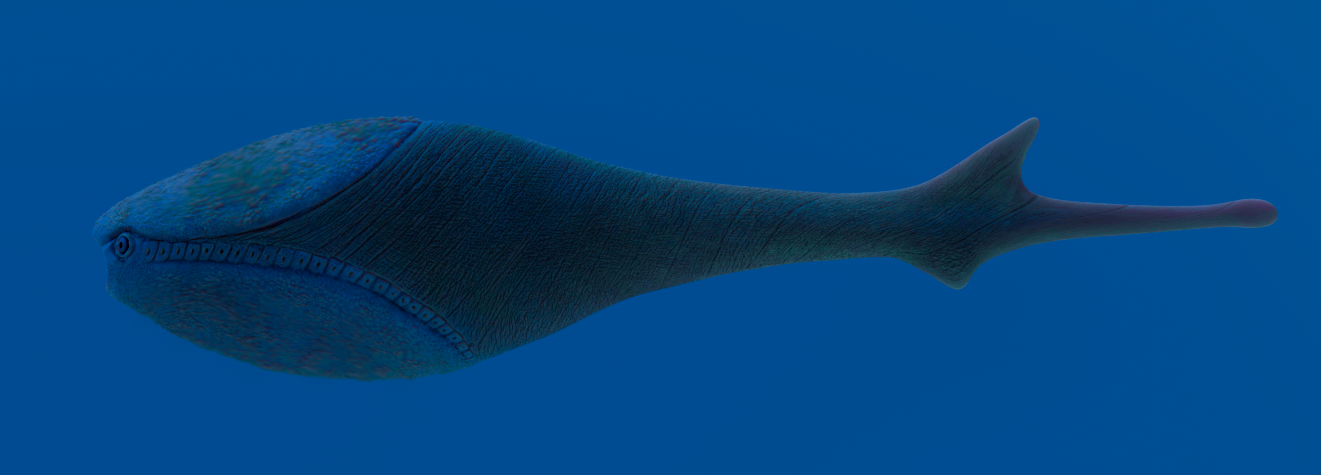
- Life reconstruction of Arandaspis prionotolepis
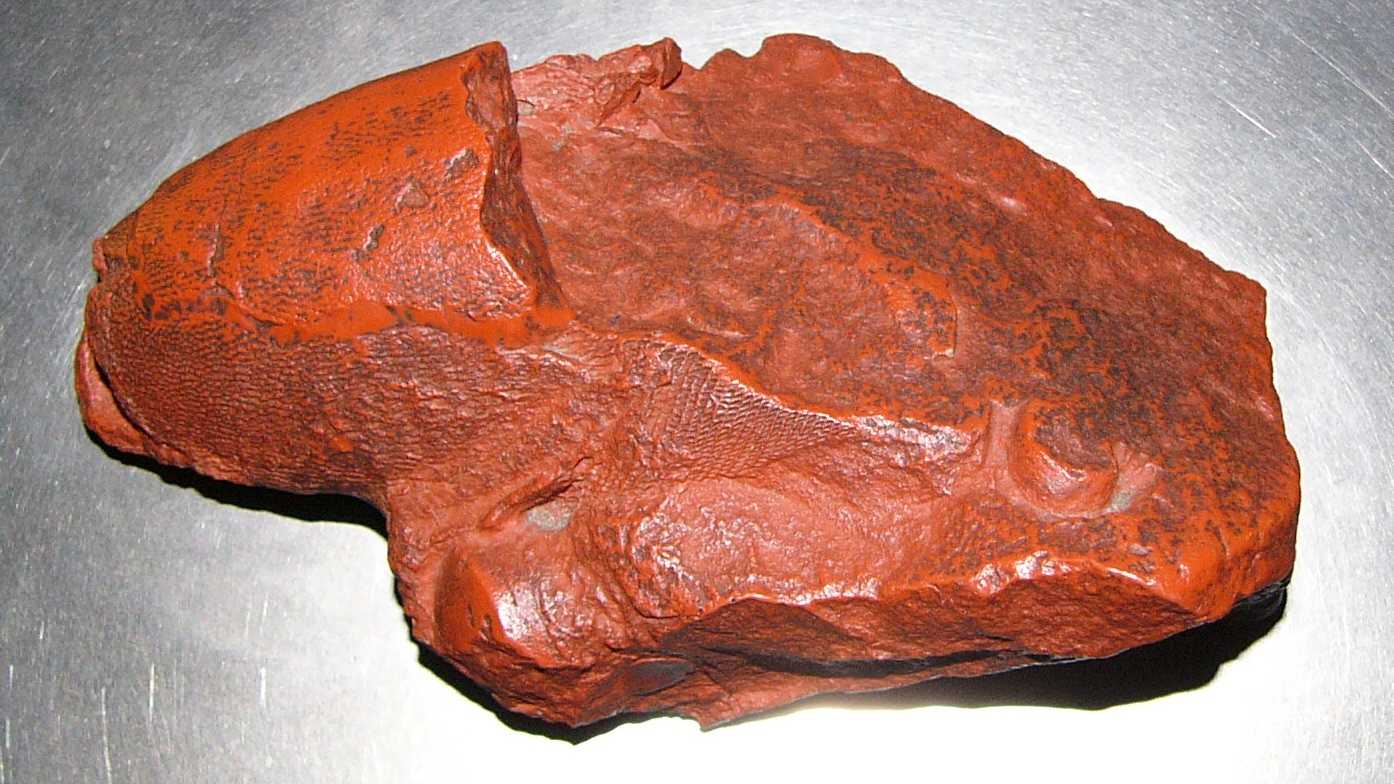
- Fossil of Arandaspis prionotolepis from the Natural History Museum in London

Scientific classification
- Kingdom: Animalia
- Phylum: Chordata
- Infraphylum: Agnatha
- Class: †Pteraspidomorpha
- Order: †Arandaspidiformes
- Family: †Arandaspididae
- Genus: †Arandaspis; Ritchie & Gilbert-Tomlinson, 1977

Type species
- †Arandaspis prionotolepis Ritchie & Gilbert-Tomlinson, 1977

Species
- †Arandaspis prionotolepis

= Arandaspis =

Arandaspis Temporal range: Middle Ordovician (Darriwilian), ~468–461 Ma

Extinct genus of Pteraspidomorph fish

Arandaspis is an extinct genus of jawless fish that lived in Australia during the Darriwilian age of the Ordovician period. It contains single species, Arandaspis prionotolepis.

== Discovery ==
Its remains were found in the Stairway Sandstone near Alice Springs, Australia in 1959, but it was not determined that they were the oldest known vertebrates until the late 1960s. The discovery of Arandaspis makes it one of the first record of a Ordovician vertebrate from the southern hemisphere.

Arandaspis is named after a local Indigenous Australian people, the Aranda (now currently called Arrernte).

== Description ==
Arandaspis is estimated to reach around 12–14 cm (5–6 in) long. It has a body covered in rows of knobbly armoured scutes. The front of the body and the head were protected by hard plates with openings for the eyes, nostrils and gills. It probably was a filter-feeder. The morphology of its trunk and tail is unknown. According to comparisons with other early ostracoderms, it would have lacked paired fins and the caudal fin would be of a simple shape, although another arandaspid Sacabambaspis had a tail consisting of dorsal and ventral webs and an elongated notochordal lobe.

== Species ==
- Arandaspis prionotolepis (Ritchie & Gilbert-Tomlinson, 1977)
- Arandaspis sp. (Young, 1997)

== See also ==
- Astraspis
- Sacabambaspis
