= Tesseraspis =

Tesseraspis Temporal range: Lochkovian

Scientific classification
- Domain: Eukaryota
- Kingdom: Animalia
- Phylum: Chordata
- Infraphylum: Agnatha
- Class: †Pteraspidomorpha
- Subclass: †Heterostraci
- Family: †Tesseraspidiformes
- Genus: †Tesseraspis; Wills, 1936

Extinct genus of jawless fishes

Tesseraspis is a Lowermost Devonian fish characteristic of the Traquairaspis Fish Zone.
