= 2018 in paleoichthyology =

This list of fossil fish described in 2018 is a list of new taxa of jawless vertebrates, placoderms, acanthodians, fossil cartilaginous fish, bony fish, and other fish of every kind described during the year 2018, as well as other significant discoveries and events related to paleontology occurring in 2018.

== Research ==
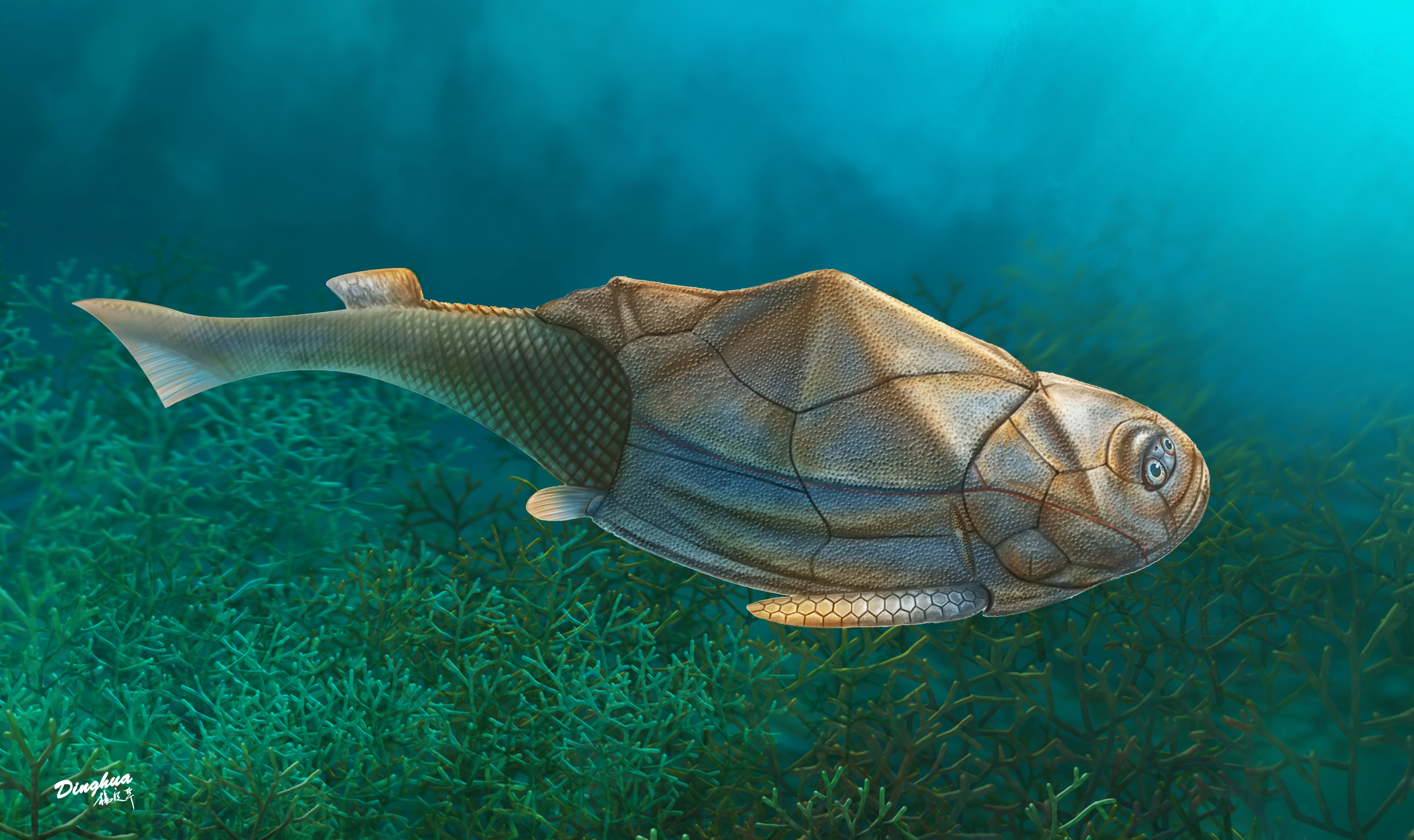
Phymolepis cuifengshanensis, life reconstruction

- A study on the fossil fish occurrences and habitat during the middle Paleozoic (480 million to 360 million years ago) is published by Sallan et al. (2018), fish originated in restricted, shallow intertidal-subtidal environments.
- A survey of Devonian fish fauna from Michigan is published by Stack & Sallan (2018).
- A study on the ecological diversification of thelodonts is published by Ferrón et al. (2018).
- The first occurrence of pelvic girdles and intromittent organs in Euphanerops longaevus, associated with a morphologically differentiated region of the axial skeleton, is reported by Chevrinais et al. (2018).
- A study on the identity of the aspidin (a primitive bone-like tissue of heterostracans) is published by Keating et al. (2018), who interpret aspidin as an acellular dermal bone.
- Redescription of Tesseraspis mosaica is published by Blieck, Elliott & Karatajūtė-Talimaa (2018).
- A study on the morphological and taxonomic diversity of pteraspidiforms is published by Romano, Sansom & Randle (2018).
- A study on the diversity of jaw shapes in modern and Paleozoic jawed fishes, evaluating whether the full extent of jaw morphological variation was established early in gnathostome evolutionary history, is published by Hill et al. (2018).
- New specimens of Brindabellaspis stensioi, providing new information on the morphology of the rostral region of the skull, are described from the Lower Devonian of the New South Wales (Australia) by King, Young & Long (2018).
- Redescription of the antiarch placoderm Asterolepis thule and a study on the age of the deposits preserving the fossils of this species is published by Newman & Den Blaauwen (2018).
- Description of bony pelvic plates in 32 specimens of Bothriolepis canadensis from the Upper Devonian Escuminac Formation (Canada) is published by Charest, Johanson & Cloutier (2018), who reject the interpretation of these structures as genital plates (suggested by Long et al., 2015), and identify them as the pelvic girdle instead.
- Redescription of the antiarch placoderm Phymolepis cuifengshanensis and a study on the phylogenetic relationships of this species is published by Wang & Zhu (2018).
- A study on the morphology of the skull, especially the braincase of the petalichthyid placoderm Shearsbyaspis oepiki is published by Castiello & Brazeau (2018).
- Fossil interpreted as placoderm (arthrodiran) egg cases are described from the Devonian (Famennian) Cleveland Shale (Ohio, United States) by Carr & Jackson (2018).
- Circular or near-circular patterned trace fossils, similar to underwater circles produced by male pufferfishes, are described from the Upper Devonian Hongguleleng Formation (China) by Zong & Gong (2018), who consider it possible that these fossils may be structures made by male fish to attract females.
- Redescription of Gladbachus adentatus and a study on the phylogenetic relationships of the species is published by Coates et al. (2018).
- A study on the wear of a tooth whorl of a specimen of Edestus heinrichi, as well as on its implications for inferring the function of the tooth whorls in this species, is published by Itano (2018).
- New description of Edestus, providing new information on the anatomy of this taxon, is published online by Tapanila et al. (2018).
- Two partial specimens of a callorhynchid chimaeroid left in open nomenclature are described from the Upper Kimmeridgian Nusplingen Plattenkalk (Germany) by Duffin (2018).
- A study on the teeth histology and vasculature of the oldest known tooth-bearing sharks, Leonodus carlsi and Celtiberina maderi, is published by Martinez-Perez et al. (2018).
- The first known basicranium of Carcharopsis wortheni is described from the Carboniferous Fayetteville Shale (United States) by Bronson, Mapes & Maisey (2018).
- A study on the morphology of the braincase of Tristychius arcuatus is published by Coates & Tietjen (2018).
- A diverse fauna of Early Triassic cartilaginous fishes is described from the Vikinghøgda Formation (Spitsbergen, Norway) by Bratvold, Delsett & Hurum (2018).
- The first material referable to hybodont shark (a member of the genus Asteracanthus) is described from the Lower Jurassic (Toarcian) Rosso Ammonitico Formation (Italy) by Romano et al. (2018), providing new information on the dispersal of this genus in the Jurassic Tethys.
- The first scroll coprolites from the Mesozoic reported so far, likely produced by euryhaline hybodontid sharks, are described from the Upper Triassic Tiki Formation of India by Rakshit et al. (2018), who name a new coprolite taxon Tikicopros triassicus.
- Description of new remains of the Late Jurassic shark Palaeocarcharias stromeri and a study on the anatomy and phylogenetic relationships of this species is published by Landemaine, Thies & Waschkewitz (2018), who name a new order Palaeocarchariiformes and a new family Palaeocarchariidae.
- Description of an articulated skeleton of a member of the palaeospinacid genus Synechodus from the Lower Cretaceous (Albian) Saint-Pô Formation (France), and a revision of the taxonomic history of the species assigned to the genus Synechodus, is published by Mollen & Hovestadt (2018).
- Late Cretaceous taxon Platylithophycus cretaceus known from the Niobrara Chalk of Kansas (United States), considered to be a green alga or a cuttlefish in earlier publications, is reinterpreted as a member of Elasmobranchii by Bronson & Maisey (2018).
- A study on the microstructure of enameloid in the isolated teeth of archaeobatid batomorphs Toarcibatis elongata, Cristabatis crescentiformis and Doliobatis weisi from the Jurassic (Toarcian) localities of Halanzy (Belgium) and Ginzebierg (Luxembourg) is published by Manzanares, Botella & Delsate (2018).
- A study on the structure of teeth of Myledaphus pustulosus from the Upper Cretaceous (Maastrichtian) Hell Creek Formation (Montana, United States) is published by Hoffman, Jensen & Hageman (2018).
- Isolated teeth of the sand shark Brachycarcharias lerichei are described from the Eocene (Ypresian) La Meseta Formation (Antarctica) by Marramà et al. (2018), representing the southernmost occurrence of the genus Brachycarcharias reported so far.
- A study on the anatomy, paleobiology and paleoecology of the Eocene requiem shark Eogaleus bolcensis is published by Marramà, Carnevale & Kriwet (2018).
- Teeth of members of the genera Galeorhinus and Physogaleus are described from the Lower Eocene sediments of the Khuiala Formation (Jaisalmer basin, India) by Pandey, Chaskar & Case (2018).
- A study on the teeth mineralization process and teeth histology in extant and fossil members of the genus Hemipristis is published by Jambura et al. (2018).
- A study on the global and regional morphological variation of the teeth of the ground sharks and mackerel sharks across the Cretaceous–Paleogene boundary is published by Bazzi et al. (2018).
- A study on the anatomy and evolution of teeth of members of the families Megachasmidae and Cetorhinidae, based on data from recent and fossil teeth, is published by Mitchell, Ciampaglio & Jacquemin (2018).
- A study on the physiological, ecological and life-history traits which influenced the biogeographic distributions of cartilaginous fishes from the Neogene to the present is published by Villafaña & Rivadeneira (2018).
- A review of the present and past (Miocene–Pleistocene) shark and ray diversity in marine waters of Tropical America is published by Carrillo-Briceño et al. (2018).
- A study on the phylogenetic relationships of extant and fossil squalomorph sharks as indicated by teeth morphology is published by Flammensbeck et al. (2018).
- A study on the morphology and phylogenetic relationships of an early bony fish known from two partial skulls recovered from the Devonian (Emsian) Taemas Limestones of the Burrinjuck area (New South Wales, Australia), possibly belonging to the genus Ligulalepis (described on the basis of isolated scales), is published by Clement et al. (2018).
- Redescription of Elonichthys germari is published by Schindler (2018), who presents the first reconstruction of the skull of this species.
- Redescription of the neotype of the elonichthyid Rhabdolepis macropterus is published by Schindler (2018), who presents new reconstruction of the skull of this species.
- A revision of ray-finned fishes from the Permian locality Buxières-les-Mines (Bourbon-l'Archambault Basin, France) is published by Štamberg (2018).
- A study on the effect of Permian–Triassic and Triassic–Jurassic extinction events on ray-finned fishes is published by Smithwick & Stubbs (2018).
- A study on the evolutionary history of ray-finned fishes across the Cretaceous–Paleogene extinction event, as indicated by isolated fossil teeth preserved in a South Pacific sediment core spanning 72–43 Ma, is published by Sibert et al. (2018).
- A study on the morphological variation of the dorsal finlets in extant bichirs, testing the viability of these anatomic structures as a tool for taxonomic diagnoses in the study of fossil members of this group, is published by Coelho, Cupello & Brito (2018).
- New data on the reproductive biology of the species Saurichthys curionii and Saurichthys macrocephalus from the Middle Triassic Meride Limestone (Monte San Giorgio, Switzerland) is presented by Maxwell et al. (2018), who identify six specimens as unambiguously gravid.
- A study on the internal anatomy of the skulls of two Early Triassic specimens of Saurichthys, as well as on the phylogenetic relationships of saurichthyiforms, is published by Argyriou et al. (2018).
- A comparative study on the bony labyrinth of early neopterygians, including relatives of gars and teleosts, is published by Giles, Rogers & Friedman (2018).
- A study on the diversity of body shapes of neopterygians from the Triassic to the Early Cretaceous is published by Clarke & Friedman (2018).
- Redescription and taxonomic reassessment of the pycnodontiform genus Cosmodus is published by Vullo et al. (2018).
- A study on 52 specimens of Pycnodus from the Eocene Monte Bolca Lagerstätte (Italy), evaluating whether the morphological variability within the sample might be related to inter- or intraspecific variation, is published by Cawley et al. (2018).
- A study on the anatomical structure and possible function of the flank bar-scales of members of Pycnodontiformes is published by Capasso (2018).
- A revision of the phylogenetic relationships of the fossils fishes belonging to the group Halecomorphi is published by Ebert (2018).
- A redescription of Asialepidotus shingyiensis and a study on the phylogenetic relationships of the species is published by Xu & Ma (2018).
- A study on the phylogenetic relationships of the Triassic neopterygian Ticinolepis, as well as on the relationships of the fossil neopterygians in general, is published by López-Arbarello & Sferco (2018).
- A study on the locomotion energetics of Leedsichthys problematicus, possible factors that drove the gigantism in pachycormiforms and the metabolic limits of body size in ray-finned fishes is published by Ferrón et al. (2018).
- An ichthyodectiform fossil specimen preserving a small skull and anterior part of the trunk is described from a core recovered from a well drilled in the Cape Verde Basin, ca. 400 km offshore from the West African Atlantic Margin, by Casson et al. (2018).
- A study on the evolutionary history of the family Catostomidae, based on data from molecules, morphology and fossil record, is published by Bagley, Mayden & Harris (2018).
- A study on the phylogenetic relationships of members of Acanthomorpha and on the timescale of the radiation of this group is published by Alfaro et al. (2018), who report that crown ages for five of the six major percomorph subclades, and for the bulk of the species diversity in the sixth, coincide with the Cretaceous–Paleogene boundary.
- A study on the morphology of the skeleton of Pholidophorus latiusculus, as well as on the phylogenetic relationships of this species, is published by Taverne (2018).
- A study on the gill-arch anatomy in Late Cretaceous–early Paleogene members of Aulopiformes is published by Beckett, Giles & Friedman (2018).
- A new specimen of Spinocaudichthys with preserved intestinal tract is described from the Cretaceous (Cenomanian) Jbel Oum Tkout Lagerstätte (Morocco) by Davesne et al. (2018).
- A study on the bone histology of extant opahs, comparing it with bones of their extant and fossil relatives (including "Aipichthys" velifer), and testing the hypothesized link between endothermy and cellular bone (bone containing embedded osteocyte cells) in teleosts, is published by Davesne et al. (2018).
- An articulated skeleton of a juvenile toadfish distinct from Louckaichthys novosadi is described from the Oligocene Bituminous Marls Formation (Romania) by Pikryl et al. (2018).
- A study on the dynamics of diversification, phenotypic evolution and habitat transitions in the ray-finned fish group Carangaria after the Cretaceous–Paleogene extinction event is published by Ribeiro et al. (2018).
- A study on the phylogenetic relationships of the fossil snake mackerels and cutlassfishes from the Eocene (Ypresian) London Clay Formation (United Kingdom) is published by Beckett et al. (2018).
- Detailed description of the caudal skeleton of the Paleogene surgeonfish Arambourgthurus scombrurus is published by Carnevale & Tyler (2018).
- A study on the morphology of the Oligocene percoid fish Oligoserranoides budensis is published by Bieńkowska-Wasiluk & Pałdyna (2018).
- A study on the Pliocene fish fossils from the Kanapoi site (Kenya) and their implications for reconstructing lake and river environments in the Kanapoi Formation is published online by Stewart & Rufolo (2018).
- A metacarpal bone of a specimen of Pteranodon, bearing teeth marks likely produced by a shark and by a saurodontid fish, is described from the Campanian Mooreville Chalk (Alabama, United States) by Ehret & Harrell (2018).
- A series of neck vertebrae of Pteranodon associated with a tooth of the lamniform shark Cretoxyrhina mantelli is described from the Upper Cretaceous Niobrara Formation (Kansas, United States) by Hone, Witton & Habib (2018), who interpret the specimen as evidence of Cretoxyrhina biting Pteranodon.
- A mawsoniid coelacanth specimen is described from Rhaetian deposits of the Var Department (France) by Deesri et al. (2018), representing the first known coelacanth from the marine Triassic of France.
- A study on both newly collected and earlier fossil material of Ventalepis ketleriensis from the Devonian (Famennian) of Latvia and central and northwestern Russia is published by Lebedev & Lukševičs (2018), who interpret the fossils as supporting the porolepiform affinities of this species, and name a new family Ventalepididae.
- Anatomical description of the endocast of "Chirodipterus" australis from the Upper Devonian Gogo Formation (Australia) is published by Henderson & Challands (2018).
- A revision of the lungfish remains from the Triassic of the Świętokrzyskie Mountains and from the northeastern Poland is published by Skrzycki, Niedźwiedzki & Tałanda (2018), who report the first known Middle Triassic finding of Arganodus worldwide and the oldest known occurrence of Ptychoceratodus in Europe.
- Lungfish burrows are reported for the first time from the Lower and Middle Triassic deposits of the Southern Cis-Urals by Sennikov (2018).
- A study on the anatomy of the lungfish Mioceratodus gregoryi from the Eocene Redbank Plains Formation (Australia) is published by Kemp (2018).
- Description of well-preserved pelvic fin skeleton of a specimen of Rhizodus hibberti from the Carboniferous (Viséan) Asbian Wardie Shales (United Kingdom) is published by Jeffery et al. (2018).
- A rediagnosis and redescription of Hyneria lindae based on new remains from the Catskill Formation (Pennsylvania, United States) is published by Daeschler & Downs (2018).

== New taxa ==
=== Jawless vertebrates ===
| Name | Novelty | Status | Authors | Age | Unit | Location | Notes | Images |
|---|---|---|---|---|---|---|---|---|
| Altigibbaspis | Gen. et sp. nov | Valid | Liu, Gai & Zhu | Devonian (early Lochkovian) | Xishancun | China | A member of Galeaspida belonging to the group Polybranchiaspiformes and the family Polybranchiaspidae. The type species is A. huiqingae. | |
| Elgaia | Gen. et comb. nov | Valid | Glinskiy | Devonian | | Estonia | A member of the family Psammosteidae. The type species is "Tartuosteus" luhai Mark-Kurik (1965). | |
| Faberaspis | Gen. et sp. nov | Valid | Elliott, Lassiter & Blieck | Devonian (Lochkovian) | Drake Bay | Canada (Nunavut) | A member of the family Cyathaspididae. The type species is F. elgae. | |
| Kalanaspis | Gen. et sp. nov | Valid | Tinn & Märss | Silurian (Aeronian) | | Estonia | An early osteostracan. Genus includes new species K. delectabilis. | |
| Nanningaspis | Gen. et sp. nov | Valid | Gai et al. | Devonian (Pragian) | Nakaolin | China | A member of Galeaspida belonging to the group Polybranchiaspiformes and the family Gumuaspidae. The type species is N. zengi. | |
| Paralogania denisoni | Sp. nov | Valid | Turner & Burrow | Silurian–Devonian boundary | Eastport | United States (Maine) | A thelodont. | |
| Platylomaspis | Gen. et sp. nov | Valid | Gai et al. | Silurian (Telychian) | Tataertag | China | A member of Galeaspida belonging to the group Polybranchiaspiformes and the family Gumuaspidae. The type species is P. serratus. | |
| Pseudolaxaspis | Gen. et comb. nov | Valid | Gai et al. | Devonian (early Lochkovian) | Tataertag | China | A member of Galeaspida belonging to the group Polybranchiaspiformes and the family Gumuaspidae. The type species is "Laxaspis" rostrata Liu (1975). | |
| Vladimirolepis | Gen. et comb. nov | Valid | Glinskiy | Devonian | | Estonia | A member of the family Psammosteidae. The type species is "Psammolepis" proia Mark-Kurik (1965). | |

=== Placoderms ===
| Name | Novelty | Status | Authors | Age | Unit | Location | Notes | Images |
|---|---|---|---|---|---|---|---|---|
| Hlavinichthys | Gen. et sp. nov | Valid | Carr | Devonian (Famennian) | Ohio Shale | United States (Ohio) | A member of Aspinothoracidi. The type species is H. jacksoni. | |
| Microbrachius kedoae | Sp. nov | Valid | Mark-Kurik et al. | Devonian (Givetian) | Moroch Beds | Belarus | | |
| Wufengshania | Gen. et sp. nov | Valid | Pan et al. | Devonian (Emsian) | | China | A member of Antiarchi belonging to the family Bothriolepididae. The type species is W. magniforaminis. | |

=== Acanthodians ===
| Name | Novelty | Status | Authors | Age | Unit | Location | Notes | Images |
|---|---|---|---|---|---|---|---|---|
| Cheiracanthus flabellicostatus | Sp. nov | Valid | Pinakhina | Middle Devonian | | Russia; United Kingdom | | |
| Drygantacanthus | Gen. et sp. nov | Valid | Voichyshyn & Szaniawski | Early Devonian | | Ukraine | A member of Ischnacanthiformes belonging to the new family Podoliacanthidae. The type species is D. semirotunda. | |
| Ginkgolepis | Gen. et sp. et comb. nov | Valid | Pinakhina & Märss | Devonian (Eifelian, Givetian, probably Famennian) | Härma Beds | Estonia; Russia | A member of Acanthodiformes belonging to the family Cheiracanthidae. The type species is G. tenericostatus; genus also includes "Cheiracanthus" talimae Valiukevičius (1985). | |
| Jolepis | Gen. et comb. nov | Valid | Burrow & Turner | Devonian (Lochkovian) | | Germany; United Kingdom | A possible acanthodian of uncertain phylogenetic placement. The type species is "Diplacanthoides" robustus Brotzen (1934). | |
| Kasperacanthus | Gen. et sp. nov | Valid | Voichyshyn & Szaniawski | Early Devonian | | Ukraine | A member of Ischnacanthiformes belonging to the new family Podoliacanthidae. The type species is K. serratus. | |
| Rhadinacanthus deltosquamosus | Sp. nov | Valid | Pinakhina & Märss | Devonian (Givetian) | Härma Beds | Estonia; Russia | A member of Diplacanthiformes belonging to the family Diplacanthidae. | |

=== Cartilaginous fishes ===
| Name | Novelty | Status | Authors | Age | Unit | Location | Notes | Images |
|---|---|---|---|---|---|---|---|---|
| Acutalamna | Gen. et sp. nov | Valid | Guinot & Carrillo-Briceño | Cretaceous (Albian and Cenomanian) | La Luna | Ecuador; France; Lithuania; Peru; Venezuela | A mackerel shark of uncertain phylogenetic placement. Genus includes new species A. karsteni. | |
| Alopias palatasi | Sp. nov | Valid | Kent & Ward | Miocene | Calvert | Malta; United States (Maryland; North Carolina; South Carolina; Virginia) | A thresher shark. | |
| Altholepis salopensis | Sp. nov | Valid | Burrow & Turner | Devonian (Lochkovian) | | United Kingdom | A member of Altholepidiformes belonging to the family Altholepididae. | |
| Altusmirus | Gen. et sp. nov | Valid | Fuchs et al. | Early Cretaceous (Valanginian) | | Austria | A ground shark. Genus includes new species A. triquetrus. | |
| Amaradontus | Gen. et sp. nov | Valid | Hodnett & Elliott | Carboniferous (Serpukhovian) | Surprise Canyon | United States (Arizona) | A member of Neoselachii belonging to the family Anachronistidae. The type species is A. santuccii. | |
| Arcuodus | Gen. et sp. et comb. nov | Valid | Itano & Lambert | Carboniferous (late Tournaisian to Viséan) | Bangor; Burlington; Keokuk; Salem | United States (Alabama; Illinois; Indiana; Iowa) | A member of Holocephali belonging to the group Cochliodontiformes. The type species is A. multicuspidatus; genus also includes "Deltodopsis" bialveatus St. John & Worthen (1883). | |
| Carcharoides lipsiensis | Sp. nov | Valid | Reinecke et al. | Oligocene (Rupelian) | Böhlen | Germany | A sand shark. | |
| Caucasochasma | Gen. et sp. nov | Valid | Prokofiev & Sychevskaya | Early Oligocene | | Russia (Krasnodar Krai) | A relative of the basking shark. The type species is C. zherikhini. | |
| Cooleyella platera | Sp. nov | Valid | Hodnett & Elliott | Carboniferous (Serpukhovian) | Surprise Canyon | United States (Arizona) | A member of Neoselachii belonging to the family Anachronistidae. | |
| Cretacladoides | Gen. et 2 sp. nov | Valid | Feichtinger et al. | Early Cretaceous (Valanginian) | | Austria | A cartilaginous fish of uncertain affinities. Originally described as a possible member of the family Falcatidae; Ivanov (2022) considered its teeth to be only superficially similar to the teeth of Paleozoic falcatids, and considered it to be a possible neoselachian. Genus includes new species C. ogiveformis and C. noricum. | |
| Cretalamna bryanti | Sp. nov | Valid | Ebersole & Ehret | Late Cretaceous (late Santonian and early Campanian) | Eutaw; Mooreville Chalk | United States (Alabama) | | |
| Deltodus tubineus | Sp. nov | Valid | Richards et al. | Carboniferous (Tournaisian) | Ballagan | United Kingdom | A member of Cochliodontiformes belonging to the family Cochliodontidae. | |
| Fornicatus | Gen. et sp. nov | Valid | Fuchs et al. | Early Cretaceous (Valanginian) | | Austria | A ground shark. Genus includes new species F. austriacus. | |
| Hokomata | Gen. et sp. nov | Valid | Hodnett & Elliott | Carboniferous (Bashkirian) | Watahomigi | United States (Arizona) | A member of Xenacanthiformes belonging to the family Diplodoselachidae. The type species is H. parva. | |
| Hybodus chuanjieensis | Sp. nov | | Sun in Sun et al. | Middle Jurassic | Chuanjie | China | | |
| Hybodus xinzhuangensis | Sp. nov | | Sun in Sun et al. | Middle Jurassic | Chuanjie | China | | |
| Igdabatis marmii | Sp. nov | Valid | Blanco | Late Cretaceous (Maastrichtian) | | Spain | | |
| Lamarodus | Gen. et sp. nov | Valid | Ivanov in Ivanov et al. | Permian (Guadalupian) | Bell Canyon | United States (Texas) | A member of Hybodontiformes belonging to the superfamily Hybodontoidea. Genus includes new species L. triangulus. Announced in 2018; the final version of the article naming it was published in 2020. | |
| Marambioraja | Gen. et sp. nov | Valid | Engelbrecht et al. | Eocene (Ypresian) | La Meseta | Antarctica (Seymour Island) | A skate. The type species is M. leiostemma. | |
| Mesetaraja | Gen. et sp. nov | Valid | Engelbrecht et al. | Eocene (Ypresian) | La Meseta | Antarctica (Seymour Island) | A skate. The type species is M. maleficapelli. | |
| Microcarcharias | Gen. et comb. nov | Valid | Guinot & Carrillo-Briceño | Late Cretaceous | Britton; Niobrara | Canada; United States; Venezuela | A sand shark; a new genus for "Odontaspis" saskatchewanensis Case, Tokaryk & Baird (1990). | |
| Microklomax | Gen. et sp. nov | Valid | Hodnett & Elliott | Carboniferous (Serpukhovian) | Surprise Canyon | United States (Arizona) | A member of Euselachii belonging to the family Protacrodontidae. The type species is M. carrieae. | |
| Mooreodontus jaini | Sp. nov | Valid | Bhat, Ray & Datta | Late Triassic | Tiki | India | A xenacanthid. | |
| Natarapax | Gen. et sp. nov | Valid | Feichtinger et al. | Early Cretaceous (Valanginian) | | Austria | A possible member of the family Ctenacanthidae. Genus includes new species N. trivortex. | |
| Novaculodus | Gen. et sp. nov | Valid | Hodnett & Elliott | Carboniferous (Serpukhovian) | Surprise Canyon | United States (Arizona) | A member of Euselachii belonging to the family Protacrodontidae. The type species is N. billingsleyi. | |
| Ostarriraja | Gen. et sp. nov | Valid | Marramà, Schultz & Kriwet | Miocene (Burdigalian) | | Austria | A member of Rajiformes of uncertain phylogenetic placement. The type species is O. parva. | |
| Palaeocentroscymnus | Gen. et comb. nov | Valid | Pollerspöck, Flammensbeck & Straube | Miocene | Lakšárska Nová Ves | Austria; Germany; Japan; Slovakia; Spain | A sleeper shark; a new genus for "Paraetmopterus" horvathi Underwood & Schlögl (2013). | |
| Palaeoheterodontus | Gen. et comb. nov | Valid | Hovestadt | Jurassic | | Germany | A bullhead shark. Genus includes "Heterodontus" sarstedtensis Thies (1983). | |
| Pastinachus kebarensis | Sp. nov | Valid | Adnet et al. | Eocene (late Bartonian) | | Tunisia | A cowtail stingray of Pastinachus. Announced in 2018; the final version of the article naming it was published in 2019. | |
| Pristrisodus | Gen. et comb. nov | Valid | Bhat, Ray & Datta | Late Triassic | Tiki | India | A member of Hybodontiformes belonging to the family Lonchidiidae. Genus includes "Parvodus" tikiensis Prasad et al. (2008). | |
| Procestracion | Gen. et comb. nov | Valid | Hovestadt | Jurassic | | Germany | A bullhead shark. Genus includes "Acrodus" semirugosus Plieninger (1847), "Hemipristis" bidens Quenstedt (1852) and "Strophodus" semirugosus Quenstedt (1852). | |
| Protoheterodontus | Gen. et comb. nov | Valid | Hovestadt | Late Cretaceous | | France; United Kingdom | A bullhead shark. Genus includes "Heterodontus" boussioni Guinot et al. (2013). | |
| Protohimantura | Gen. et comb. nov | Valid | Marramà et al. | Miocene (Burdigalian?) | Tonasa | Indonesia | A whiptail stingray belonging to the subfamily Urogymninae. The type species is "Trygon" vorstmani de Beaufort (1926). | |
| Raja amphitrita | Sp. nov | Valid | Engelbrecht et al. | Eocene (Ypresian and Lutetian) | La Meseta; Submeseta | Antarctica (Seymour Island) | A skate, a species of Raja. | |
| Raja manitaria | Sp. nov | Valid | Engelbrecht et al. | Eocene (Ypresian and Lutetian) | La Meseta; Submeseta | Antarctica (Seymour Island) | A skate, a species of Raja. | |
| Similiteroscyllium | Gen. et sp. et comb. nov | Valid | Fuchs et al. | Early Cretaceous (Valanginian) | | Austria; France | A carpet shark. Genus includes new species S. iniquus, as well as "Ornatoscyllium" rugasimulatum Guinot, Cappetta & Adnet (2014). | |
| Squalicorax acutus | Sp. nov | Valid | Siversson et al. | Late Cretaceous (Cenomanian) | Gearle | Australia | | |
| Squalicorax bazzii | Sp. nov | Valid | Siversson et al. | Late Cretaceous (Cenomanian) | Gearle | Australia | | |
| Squalicorax lalunaensis | Sp. nov | Valid | Guinot & Carrillo-Briceño | Late Cretaceous (Cenomanian) | La Luna | Venezuela | | |
| Squalicorax moodyi | Sp. nov | Valid | Guinot & Carrillo-Briceño | Late Cretaceous (Cenomanian) | La Luna | Venezuela | | |
| Squalicorax mutabilis | Sp. nov | Valid | Siversson et al. | Late Cretaceous (Cenomanian and Turonian) | Haycock | Australia | | |
| Stethacanthus concavus | Sp. nov | Valid | Ginter | Carboniferous (Gzhelian) | Indian Cave | United States (Nebraska) | | |
| Tamiobatis elgae | Sp. nov | Valid | Ivanov in Ivanov & Plax | Devonian (Famennian) and Carboniferous (Tournaisian) | | Belarus | A member of Ctenacanthiformes belonging to the family Ctenacanthidae. | |
| Tikiodontus | Gen. et sp. nov | Valid | Bhat, Ray & Datta | Late Triassic | Tiki | India | A xenacanthid. Genus includes new species T. asymmetricus. | |
| Truyolsodontos | Gen. et sp. nov | Valid | Bernárdez | Late Cretaceous (Cenomanian) | | Spain | A mackerel shark. Genus includes new species T. estauni. | |
| Whitropus | Gen. et sp. nov | Valid | Richards et al. | Carboniferous (Tournaisian) | Ballagan | United Kingdom | A member of Cochliodontiformes of uncertain phylogenetic placement. The type species is W. longicalcus. | |

=== Ray-finned fishes ===
| Name | Novelty | Status | Authors | Age | Unit | Location | Notes | Images |
|---|---|---|---|---|---|---|---|---|
| Allogenartina | Gen. et sp. nov | Valid | Schwarzhans, Huddleston & Takeuchi | Late Cretaceous (Santonian and Campanian) | Eutaw | United States (Alabama; New Jersey) | Possibly a member of Stomiiformes belonging to the group Gonostomatoidei, of uncertain phylogenetic placement within the latter group. The type species is A. muscogeei. | |
| Amakusaichthys | Gen. et sp. nov | Valid | Yabumoto, Hirose & Brito | Late Cretaceous (Santonian) | Hinoshima | Japan | A member of Ichthyodectiformes. Genus includes new species A. goshouraensis. Announced in 2018; the final version of the article naming it was published in 2020. | |
| Ameiurus grangerensis | Sp. nov | Valid | Smith, Martin & Carpenter | Miocene | Ellensburg | United States (Washington) | A species of Ameiurus. | |
| Amphiarius paleoorinocoensis | Sp. nov | Valid | Aguilera & Marceniuk | Late Miocene | Urumaco | Venezuela | A species of Amphiarius. | |
| Anchiacipenser | Gen. et sp. nov | Valid | Sato et al. | Late Cretaceous (Campanian) | Dinosaur Park | Canada (Alberta) | A sturgeon. Genus includes new species A. acanthaspis. | |
| Andrewsolepis | Gen. et sp. nov | Valid | Elliott | Carboniferous (Bashkirian) | Lower Coal Measures | United Kingdom | A member of Actinopteri belonging to the family Haplolepidae. The type species is A. lochlani. | |
| "Anguilloideus" angulatus | Sp. nov | Valid | Nolf & Rundle | Paleogene | | | | |
| Apateodus? assisi | Sp. nov | Valid | Schwarzhans, Huddleston & Takeuchi | Late Cretaceous (Santonian) | Eutaw | United States (Alabama) | A member of Aulopiformes belonging to the family Ichthyotringidae. | |
| Aphanolebias sarmaticus | Sp. nov | Valid | Reichenbacher, Filipescu & Miclea | Middle Miocene | | Romania | | |
| Apsopelix ?berlinensis | Sp. nov | Valid | Schwarzhans | Early Cretaceous (Berriasian to Valanginian) | | Germany; Israel | A member of Crossognathiformes belonging to the family Crossognathidae. | |
| Archaeglossus | Gen. et comb. et sp. nov | Valid | Schwarzhans | Jurassic (Bathonian to Tithonian) | | United Kingdom | A member of Osteoglossiformes of uncertain phylogenetic placement. The type species is "Otolithus (Leptolepidarum)" pentangulatus Frost (1924); genus also includes new species A. torrensi. | |
| Ariopsis ariopsilus | Sp. nov | Valid | Aguilera & Marceniuk | Late Miocene | Urumaco | Venezuela | A species of Ariopsis. | |
| Atherina carnevalei | Sp. nov | Valid | Reichenbacher, Filipescu & Miclea | Middle Miocene | | Romania | A species of Atherina. | |
| Aulothrissus | Gen. et 2 sp. nov | Valid | Schwarzhans | Early Cretaceous (Berriasian to Valanginian) | Gevaram | Israel | A member of Elopiformes of uncertain phylogenetic placement. The type species is A. avitus; genus also includes A. heletzensis. | |
| Avonichthys | Gen. et sp. nov | | Wilson, Pardo & Anderson | Carboniferous (Tournaisian) | Horton Bluff | Canada (Nova Scotia) | An early ray-finned fish. The type species is A. manskyi. | |
| Bagre urumacoensis | Sp. nov | Valid | Aguilera & Marceniuk | Late Miocene | Urumaco | Venezuela | A species of Bagre. | |
| Benthalbella praecessor | Sp. nov | Valid | Nazarkin & Carnevale | Miocene (late Langhian–early Serravallian) | Kurasi | Russia (Sakhalin Oblast) | A species of Benthalbella. | |
| Bicavolithus | Gen. et sp. nov | Valid | Schwarzhans | Early Cretaceous (Albian) | | Germany | A teleost of uncertain phylogenetic placement. Genus includes new species B. cavatus. | |
| Blairolepis wallacei | Sp. nov | Valid | Elliott | Carboniferous (Bashkirian) | Lower Coal Measures | United Kingdom | A member of Actinopteri belonging to the family Haplolepidae. | |
| Blennius? martinii | Sp. nov | Valid | Reichenbacher, Filipescu & Miclea | Middle Miocene | | Romania | A combtooth blenny. | |
| Bluefieldius | Gen. et sp. nov | Valid | Mickle | Carboniferous (late Mississippian) | Bluefield | United States (West Virginia) | An early ray-finned fish. The type species is B. mercerensis. | |
| Braccohaplolepis | Gen. et sp. nov | Valid | Elliott | Carboniferous (Bashkirian) | Lower Coal Measures | United Kingdom | A member of Actinopteri belonging to the family Haplolepidae. The type species is B. fenestratum. | |
| Cerinichthys | Gen. et sp. nov | Valid | Ebert | Late Jurassic | | France | A member of Halecomorphi belonging to the new order Ophiopsiformes. Genus includes new species C. koelblae. | |
| Champsodon tethensis | Sp. nov | Valid | Bannikov | Eocene (Bartonian) | | Russia | A species of Champsodon | |
| Chaoia | Gen. et comb. nov | Valid | Bannikov, Schwarzhans & Carnevale | Neogene | | Austria; Croatia; Romania | A member of the family Sciaenidae. The type species is "Sciaena" moguntiniformis Pana (1977). | |
| Clupea macrocephala | Sp. nov | Junior homonym | Yabumoto & Nazarkin | Miocene | Bessho | Japan | A species of Clupea. The specific name is preoccupied by Clupea macrocephala Lacépède (1803); Yabumoto & Nazarkin (2020) coined a replacement name Clupea hanishinaensis. | |
| Coryphaenoides scrupus | Sp. nov | Valid | Brzobohatý & Nolf | Middle Miocene | | Czech Republic | A species of Coryphaenoides. | |
| Cowetaichthys | Gen. et 2 sp. et comb. nov | Valid | Schwarzhans, Huddleston & Takeuchi | Late Cretaceous (Santonian to Maastrichtian) and Paleocene | Eutaw | Denmark; Germany; Greenland; United States (Alabama) | A beardfish. The type species is C. alabamae; genus also includes new species C. amberi, as well as "genus Polymixiidarum" beaury Schwarzhans (2010), "genus Veliferidarum" groenlandicus Schwarzhans (2004) and "genus Veliferidarum" harderi Schwarzhans (2003). | |
| Cretolepis | Gen. et sp. nov | Valid | Wang et al. | Early Cretaceous | Longjiang | China | A member of Palaeonisciformes. The type species is C. dongbeiensis. | |
| Croatosciaena | Gen. et sp. nov | Valid | Bannikov, Schwarzhans & Carnevale | Middle Miocene | | Croatia | A member of the family Sciaenidae. The type species is C. krambergeri. | |
| Cubariomma | Gen. et sp. nov | Valid | Bannikov | Early Oligocene | | Russia (Adygea) | A member of Stromateoidei of uncertain phylogenetic placement. Genus includes new species C. yanakuzminae. | |
| Dapedium ballei | Sp. nov | Valid | Maxwell & López-Arbarello | Middle Jurassic (Aalenian) | Opalinuston | Germany | | |
| Doggerichthys | Gen. et sp. nov | Valid | Schwarzhans | Middle Jurassic (Aalenian | | Germany | A member of Leptolepidiformes sensu lato of uncertain phylogenetic placement. Genus includes new species D. anguilliformis. | |
| Eleogobius prochazkai | Sp. nov | Valid | Reichenbacher, Filipescu & Miclea | Middle Miocene | | Romania | | |
| Elops eutawanus | Sp. nov | Valid | Schwarzhans, Huddleston & Takeuchi | Late Cretaceous (Santonian) | Eutaw | United States (Alabama) | A species of Elops. | |
| Eoalosa | Gen. et sp. nov | Valid | Marramà & Carnevale | Eocene (Ypresian) | Monte Bolca | Italy | A member of the family Clupeidae. The type species is E. janvieri. | |
| Eoellimmichthys | Gen. et sp. nov | Valid | Marramà et al. | Eocene (late Ypresian) | Monte Bolca | Italy | A member of Clupeomorpha belonging to the group Ellimmichthyiformes and the family Paraclupeidae. The type species is E. superstes. | |
| Eutawichthys | Gen. et 2 sp. et comb. nov | Valid | Schwarzhans, Huddleston & Takeuchi | Late Cretaceous (Santonian to Maastrichtian) | Eutaw | United States (Alabama; Maryland; Mississippi; New Jersey; Tennessee) | A member of Beryciformes belonging to the group Berycoidei, of uncertain phylogenetic placement within the latter group. The type species is E. stringeri; genus also includes new species E. compressus, as well as "genus Apogonidarum" maastrichtiensis Nolf & Stringer (1996) and "genus Apogonidarum" zideki Nolf & Stringer (1996). | |
| Furloichthys | Gen. et sp. nov | Valid | Taverne & Capasso | Late Cretaceous (Cenomanian) | | Italy | A member of the family Ichthyodectidae. The type species is F. bonarellii. | |
| Fuyuanichthys | Gen. et sp. nov | Valid | Xu, Ma & Ren | Middle Triassic (Ladinian) | Falang | China | An early member of Ginglymodi. The type species is F. wangi. | |
| Genartina cretacea | Sp. nov | Valid | Schwarzhans, Huddleston & Takeuchi | Late Cretaceous (Santonian) | Eutaw | United States (Alabama) | Possibly a member of Stomiiformes. | |
| Gobius apuseni | Sp. nov | Valid | Reichenbacher, Filipescu & Miclea | Middle Miocene | | Romania | A species of Gobius. | |
| Gobius holcovae | Sp. nov | Valid | Reichenbacher, Filipescu & Miclea | Middle Miocene | | Romania | A species of Gobius. | |
| Gobius manfredi | Sp. nov | Valid | Reichenbacher, Filipescu & Miclea | Middle Miocene | | Romania | A species of Gobius. | |
| Grimmenichthys | Gen. et sp. nov | Valid | Konwert & Hörnig | Early Jurassic (Toarcian) | | Germany | A member of Pholidophoriformes. Genus includes new species G. ansorgei. | |
| Guimarotaichthys | Gen. et sp. nov | Valid | Schwarzhans | Late Jurassic | Camadas de Guimarota | Portugal | A non-teleost bony fish of uncertain phylogenetic placement. Genus includes new species G. problematicus. | |
| Haqelpycnodus | Gen. et sp. nov | Valid | Taverne & Capasso | Late Cretaceous (Cenomanian) | | Lebanon | A member of the family Pycnodontidae. The type species is H. picteti. | |
| "Harpadontina" distorta | Sp. nov | Valid | Nolf & Rundle | Paleogene | | | | |
| Ijimaia rara | Sp. nov | Valid | Brzobohatý & Nolf | Middle Miocene | | Czech Republic | A species of Ijimaia. | |
| Italoalbula | Gen. et sp. nov | Valid | Taverne & Capasso | Early Cretaceous (Albian) | Pietraroja | Italy | A bonefish. The type species is I. pietrarojae. | |
| Joffrichthys tanyourus | Sp. nov | Valid | Murray et al. | Paleocene | Paskapoo | Canada (Alberta) | A member of Osteoglossomorpha of uncertain phylogenetic placement. | |
| Kalabisia | Gen. et sp. nov | Valid | Přikryl & Carnevale | Oligocene–early Miocene | Ždánicko-Hustopeče | Czech Republic | A viviparous brotula belonging to the subfamily Brosmophycinae. The type species is K. krumvirensis. | |
| Lagocephalus striatus | Sp. nov | Valid | Aguilera et al. | Miocene (Serravallian) | Valiente Peninsula | Panama | A species of Lagocephalus. | |
| Lanarkichthys | Gen. et sp. nov | Valid | Elliott | Carboniferous (Bashkirian) | Lower Coal Measures | United Kingdom | A member of Actinopteri of uncertain phylogenetic placement. The type species is L. gardineri. | |
| Landinisciaena | Gen. et sp. et comb. nov | Valid | Bannikov, Schwarzhans & Carnevale | Miocene (late Burdigalian or early Langhian) | | Belgium; Germany; Russia | A member of the family Sciaenidae. The type species is L. popovi; genus also includes "Atractoscion" elongatissimus Schwarzhans (1993). | |
| Lanxangichthys | Gen. et sp. nov | Valid | Cavin et al. | Early Cretaceous (Aptian) | Grès supérieurs Khok Kruat? | Laos; Thailand? | A gar. Genus includes new species L. alticephalus. | |
| Lasalichthys otischalkensis | Sp. nov | Valid | Gibson | Late Triassic | Dockum Group | United States (Texas) | A member of Redfieldiiformes. | |
| Leptoelops | Gen. et comb. nov | Valid | Schwarzhans | Middle Jurassic | | Germany | A member of Elopiformes of uncertain phylogenetic placement. The type species is Otolithus (Lycopteridarum) rhenanus Weiler (1954); genus also includes Otolithus (Lycopteridarum) acutus Weiler (1954). | |
| Leptosciaena | Gen. et comb. et sp. nov | Valid | Bannikov, Schwarzhans & Carnevale | Neogene | | Azerbaijan; Italy; Kazakhstan | A member of the family Sciaenidae. The type species is "Genyonemus" karagiensis Bratishko, Schwarzhans & Reichenbacher (2015); genus also includes "Otolithus (Mugilidarum)" azerbaidjanicus Djafarova (2006), as well as new species L. caputoi. | |
| Leuroglossus kobylianskyi | Sp. nov | Valid | Nazarkin | Middle–Late Miocene | Kurasi | Russia (Sakhalin Oblast) | A species of Leuroglossus | |
| Libanopycnodus | Gen. et sp. nov | Valid | Taverne & Capasso | Late Cretaceous (Cenomanian) | | Lebanon | A member of the family Pycnodontidae. The type species is L. wenzi. | |
| Lopadichthys | Gen. et sp. nov | Valid | Murray et al. | Paleocene | Paskapoo | Canada (Alberta) | A member of Osteoglossiformes. The type species is L. colwellae. | |
| Macroynis | Gen. et sp. nov | Valid | Beckett et al. | Eocene | London Clay | United Kingdom | A relative of snake mackerels and cutlassfishes. Genus includes new species M. casieri. | |
| Motlayoichthys | Gen. et sp. nov | Valid | Arratia, González-Rodríguez & Hernández-Guerrero | Cretaceous (Albian-Cenomanian) | El Doctor | Mexico | A member of Crossognathiformes belonging to the family Pachyrhizodontidae. The type species is M. sergioi. | |
| Mylocheilus kevinmeeksi | Sp. nov | Valid | Smith, Martin & Carpenter | Miocene | Ellensburg | United States (Washington) | A relative of the peamouth. | |
| Nardoglossus | Gen. et sp. nov. | Valid | Taverne & Capasso | Late Cretaceous (Campanian-Maastrichtian) | Altamura | Italy | A member of Gonorynchiformes belonging to the group Gonorynchoidei. The type species is N. sanctibernardini. | |
| Nipponocypris takayamai | Sp. nov | Valid | Miyata, Yabumoto & Hirano | Middle Pleistocene | Nogami | Japan | A species of Nipponocypris. | |
| Palealbula declivis | Sp. nov | Valid | Schwarzhans | Early Cretaceous (Valanginian) | | Germany | A member of Albuliformes of uncertain phylogenetic placement. | |
| Palealbula depressidorsalis | Sp. nov | Valid | Schwarzhans | Early Cretaceous (Albian) | | United Kingdom | A member of Albuliformes of uncertain phylogenetic placement. | |
| Paleoschizothorax | Gen. et sp. nov | Valid | Yang et al. | Oligocene | Qaidam Basin | China | A member of the family Cyprinidae related to members of the genus Schizothorax. Genus includes new species P. qaidamensis. | |
| Paleoserranus | Gen. et sp. nov | Valid | Cantalice, Alvarado-Ortega & Alaniz-Galvan | Paleocene | | Mexico | A member of the family Serranidae. Genus includes new species P. lakamhae. | |
| Parahaplolepis poppaea | Sp. nov | Valid | Elliott | Carboniferous (Bashkirian) | Lower Coal Measures | United Kingdom | A member of Actinopteri belonging to the family Haplolepidae. | |
| Peltopleurus tyrannos | Sp. nov | Valid | Xu, Ma & Zhao | Middle Triassic (Ladinian) | Falang | China | | |
| Pickeringius | Gen. et sp. nov | Valid | Choo et al. | Late Devonian | Gogo | Australia | An early ray-finned fish. Genus includes new species P. acanthophorus. | |
| Piranhamesodon | Gen. et sp. nov | Valid | Kölbl-Ebert et al. | Late Jurassic (late Kimmeridgian to early Tithonian) | | Germany | A member of Pycnodontiformes of uncertain phylogenetic placement. The type species is P. pinnatomus. | |
| Pontosciaena | Gen. et comb. nov | Valid | Bannikov, Schwarzhans & Carnevale | Neogene | | Crimean Peninsula Azerbaijan? Romania? | A member of the family Sciaenidae. The type species is "Serranus" acuterostratus Rückert-Ülkümen (1996); genus might also include "Otolithus (Percidarum)" sigmoilinoides Pobedina (1956). | |
| Protalbula websteri | Sp. nov | Valid | Schwarzhans | Late Jurassic (Kimmeridgian) | | United Kingdom | A member of Albuliformes of uncertain phylogenetic placement. | |
| Protarpon boualii | Sp. nov | Valid | Khalloufi et al. | Paleocene (Danian) | Oulad Abdoun Basin | Morocco | A relative of tarpons. | |
| Protoelops | Gen. et comb. nov | Valid | Schwarzhans | Middle Jurassic to Early Cretaceous (Bathonian to Aptian) | | Spain; United Kingdom | A member of the family Elopidae. The type species is "Otolithus (Leptolepidarum)" cuneiformis Frost (1924); genus also includes "Leptolepis" tenuirostris Stinton (1968) and "genus Protacanthopterygiorum" scalpellum Nolf (2004). | |
| Protosciaena kirbyorum | Sp. nov | Valid | Stringer & Bell | Early Pliocene | | United States (Georgia (U.S. state)) | A member of the family Sciaenidae. | |
| Pseudogonatodus aurulentum | Sp. nov | Valid | Elliott | Carboniferous (Bashkirian) | Lower Coal Measures | United Kingdom | A member of Actinopteri belonging to the family Gonatodidae. | |
| Pseudohaplolepis | Gen. et sp. nov | Valid | Elliott | Carboniferous (Bashkirian) | Lower Coal Measures | United Kingdom | A member of Actinopteri of uncertain phylogenetic placement. The type species is P. argentatum. | |
| Pseudotrichiurus | Gen. et sp. nov | Valid | Schwarzhans, Huddleston & Takeuchi | Late Cretaceous (Santonian) | Eutaw | United States (Alabama) | A member of Aulopiformes of uncertain phylogenetic placement. The type species is P. sagax. | |
| Pterothrissus carolinensis | Sp. nov | Valid | Stringer et al. | Late Cretaceous (early Campanian) | Tar Heel | United States (North Carolina) | A relative of the Japanese gissu. | |
| Quasimodichthys | Gen. et comb. nov | Valid | Paiva & Gallo | Late Jurassic (Oxfordian) | Pastos Bons | Brazil | A member of Semionotiformes. The type species is "Lepidotus" piauhyensis Roxo & Löfgren (1936) | |
| Rhadinichthys glabrolepis | Sp. nov | Valid | Elliott | Carboniferous (Bashkirian) | Lower Coal Measures | United Kingdom | A member of Actinopteri belonging to the family Rhadinichthyidae. | |
| Rhadinichthys? ornatocephalum | Sp. nov | Valid | Elliott | Carboniferous (Bashkirian) | Lower Coal Measures | United Kingdom | A member of Actinopteri belonging to the family Rhadinichthyidae. | |
| Rhadinichthys? plumosum | Sp. nov | Valid | Elliott | Carboniferous (Bashkirian) | Lower Coal Measures | United Kingdom | A member of Actinopteri belonging to the family Rhadinichthyidae. | |
| Sanjuanableps | Gen. et sp. nov | Valid | Bogan et al. | Late Miocene | | Argentina | A member of the family Anablepidae. Genus includes new species S. calingasta. | |
| Saurichthys spinosa | Sp. nov | Valid | Wu, Sun & Fang | Middle Triassic (Anisian) | Guanling | China | | |
| Sciades latissimum | Sp. nov | Valid | Aguilera & Marceniuk | Late Miocene | Urumaco | Venezuela | A species of Sciades. | |
| Sciades peregrinus | Sp. nov | Valid | Aguilera & Marceniuk | Late Miocene | Urumaco | Venezuela | A species of Sciades. | |
| Scleropages belgicus | Sp. nov | Valid | Nolf & Rundle | Paleogene | | | A species of Scleropages. | |
| Scopulipiscis | Gen. et sp. nov | Valid | Latimer & Giles | Late Triassic | Kössen | Switzerland | A relative of Dapedium. Genus includes new species S. saxciput. | |
| Sigmapycnodus | Gen. et sp. nov | Valid | Taverne & Capasso | Late Cretaceous (Cenomanian) | | Lebanon | A member of the family Pycnodontidae. The type species is S. giganteus. | |
| Sphaeronchus rundlei | Sp. nov | Valid | Schwarzhans | Late Jurassic (Kimmeridgian) | Kimmeridge Clay | United Kingdom | A member of Leptolepidiformes sensu lato of uncertain phylogenetic placement. | |
| "Umbrida" perforata | Sp. nov | Valid | Nolf & Rundle | Paleogene | | | | |
| Vinctifer ferrusquiai | Sp. nov | Valid | Cantalice, Alvarado-Ortega & Brito | Late Jurassic (Kimmeridgian) | Sabinal | Mexico | A member of Aspidorhynchiformes belonging to the family Aspidorhynchidae. | |
| Vox thlotlo | Gen. et sp. nov | Valid | Schwarzhans, Huddleston & Takeuchi | Late Cretaceous (Santonian) | Eutaw | United States (Alabama) | A teleost of uncertain phylogenetic placement. The type species is V. thlotlo. | |
| Wettonius | Gen. et sp. nov | Valid | Carnevale & Bannikov | Eocene | Monte Bolca; Nanjemoy Formation | Italy; United States (Virginia) | A member of the family Veliferidae. Genus includes new species W. angeloi. | |
| Xenoleptolepis | Gen. et comb. nov | Valid | Schwarzhans | Early Jurassic to Early Cretaceous (Sinemurian to Berriasian) | | Germany; United Kingdom | A member of the family Leptolepididae sensu lato. The type species is Otolithus (incertae sedis) withersi Frost (1926); genus also includes Otolithus (Salmonoidei) oncorhynchoides Weiler (1954). | |
| Yuskaichthys | Gen. et sp. nov | Valid | Bogan, Agnolin & Scanferla | Eocene | Maíz Gordo | Argentina | A member of the family Andinichthyidae. The type species is Y. eocenicus. | |
| Zaprora koreana | Sp. nov | Valid | Nam & Nazarkin | Neogene | | South Korea | A relative of the prowfish. | |
| Zurupleuropholis | Gen. et 2 sp. nov | Valid | Giordano et al. | Early Cretaceous (Albian) | Lagarcito | Argentina | A relative of Pleuropholis. Genus includes new species Z. quijadensis and Z. decollavi. | |

=== Lobe-finned fishes ===
| Name | Novelty | Status | Authors | Age | Unit | Location | Notes | Images |
|---|---|---|---|---|---|---|---|---|
| Celsiodon | Gen. et sp. nov | Valid | Clack et al. | Devonian (late Famennian) | | Greenland | A lungfish related to Ctenodus. Genus includes new species is C. ahlbergi. | |
| Ceratodus tunuensis | Sp. nov | Valid | Agnolin et al. | Late Triassic | Fleming Fjord | Greenland | A lungfish. | |
| Eusthenopteron jenkinsi | Sp. nov | Valid | Downs et al. | Devonian (Frasnian) | Fram | Canada (Nunavut) | | |
| Mawsonia soba | Sp. nov | Valid | Brito et al. | Early Cretaceous | Babouri Figuil Basin | Cameroon | A coelacanth. | |
| Ptychoceratodus oldhami | Sp. nov | Valid | Bhat & Ray | Late Triassic (Carnian) | Tiki | India | A lungfish. Announced in 2018; the final version of the article naming it was published in 2020. | |
