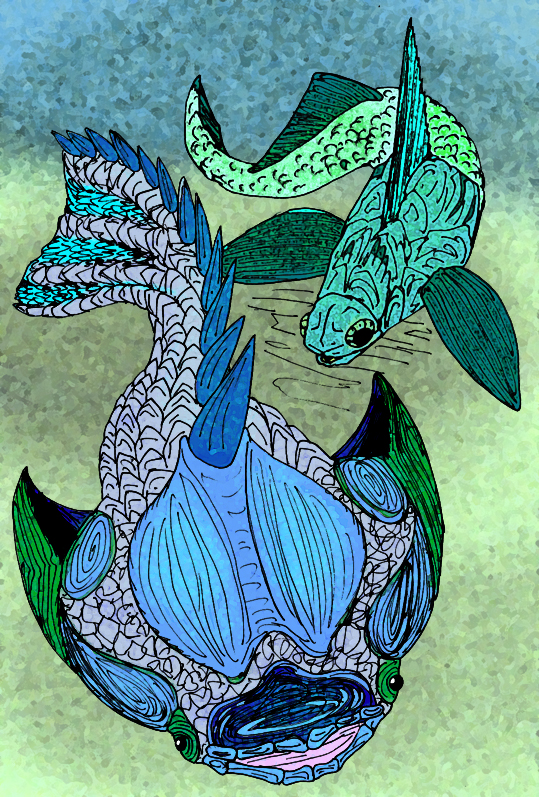
- Drepanaspis gemuendina and Tiaraspis subtilis

Scientific classification
- Domain: Eukaryota
- Kingdom: Animalia
- Phylum: Chordata
- Infraphylum: Agnatha
- Class: †Pteraspidomorpha
- Subclass: †Heterostraci
- Order: †Pteraspidiformes
- Suborder: †Psammosteida
- Family: †Psammosteidae

Genera
- Drepanaspis; Psammosteus; Pycnosteus; Schizosteus; Tartuosteus

= Psammosteidae =

Psammosteidae Temporal range: 416–359 Ma Early to Late Devonian

Extinct family of jawless fishes

Psammosteidae is an extinct family of flattened, benthic heterostracan vertebrates that lived in marine and estuary environments in Europe, Russia & North America. They arose during the Early Devonian, with the first (and best) known genus, Drepanaspis from the Hunsrück lagerstätte. The Psammosteids were the only heterostracans that survived the Upper Frasnian extinction event during the Late Devonian, dying out in the extinction event at the very end of the Devonian.
