= Toarcibatidae =

Scientific classification
- Kingdom: Animalia
- Phylum: Chordata
- Class: Chondrichthyes
- Subclass: Elasmobranchii
- Division: Batomorphi
- Family: †Toarcibatidae; Greenfield, Delsate, & Candoni, 2022

Genera
- †Cristabatis; †Toarcibatis

Synonyms
- "Archaeobatidae" Delsate & Candoni, 2001 (nomen nudum)

Extinct family of rays

Toarcibatidae is a family of extinct rays that lived in the Early Jurassic in what would become Europe and North America. The family includes two genera, Cristabatis and Toarcibatis, and was originally named "Archaeobatidae", but that name did not conform to the International Code of Zoological Nomenclature and was replaced. Doliobatis was originally included in this family as well, but it has since been reassigned to the Rhinobatidae.
