= Catshark =

Catshark may refer to:

- Scyliorhinidae, a family of ground sharks, many species of which are commonly referred to as "catshark".
- Pentanchidae, a family of ground sharks with the overall name deepwater catsharks, but many species are referred to as "catshark". This species in this family were formerly included in the Scyliorhinidae.
- Atelomycteridae, a family of ground sharks with the overall name coloured catsharks, but many species are referred to as "catshark". This species in this family were formerly included in the Scyliorhinidae.
- Pseudotriakidae, a family of ground sharks with the overall name false catsharks.
- Proscylliidae, a family of ground sharks with the overall name finback catsharks, but all species are referred to as "catshark".
- Bullhead shark, a family and a genus called nekosame (猫鮫(ネコザメ); lit. "cat-shark") in Japanese
