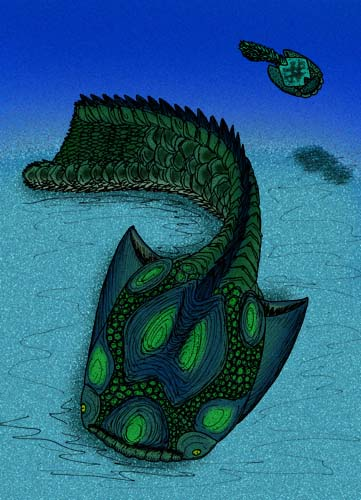
- Drepanaspis gemuendenensis reconstruction

Scientific classification
- Kingdom: Animalia
- Phylum: Chordata
- Infraphylum: Agnatha
- Class: †Pteraspidomorpha
- Subclass: †Heterostraci
- Order: †Pteraspidiformes
- Suborder: †Psammosteida; Kiaer, 1932

Taxa
- Family Drepanaspididae; Family Guerichosteidae; Family Obrucheviidae; Family Русnоstеidае; Family Psammolepididae; Family Psammosteidae; Genus Schizosteus; Genus Tartuosteus

= Psammosteida =

Psammosteida Temporal range: Devonian (Emsian–Frasnian)

Extinct suborder of jawless fishes

Psammosteida also called as Psammosteoidei is a suborder of pteraspidid heterostracan agnathans. The psammosteids had broad, flattened bodies, suggesting a predominantly benthic habit. The earliest unequivocal psammosteid is Drepanaspis of Early Devonian Germany. Other notable psammosteids include Psammosteus, and Obruchevia, two genera of enormous species with dorsal shields around one meter in diameter. The Psammosteids were the only heterostracans to survive to the end of the Devonian, where they finally perish during the Hangenberg event.

== Classification ==
=== Internal relationships ===
==== Taxonomy ====
The following families and genera were recognised by Glinskiy (2017) in the suborder Psammosteoidei:

Suborder Psammosteoidei (sensu Psammosteida Kiaer, 1932 emend. Tarlo, 1962)

- Family Drepanaspididae Traquair, 1899
  - Genus Drepanaspis Schlüter, 1887
- Family Guerichosteidae Tarlo, 1964
  - Genus Guerichosteus Tarlo, 1964 (= ?Hariosteus Tarlo, 1964)
- Family Obrucheviidae Tarlo, 1964
  - Genus Obruchevia Whitley 1940
  - Genus Perscheia Elliott, Mark-Kurik & Daeschler, 2004
- Family Русnоstеidае Tarlo, 1962
  - Genus Ganosteus Rohon, 1901
  - Genus Pycnolepis Tarlo, 1964
  - Genus Pycnosteus Preobrazhensky, 1911
- Family Psammolepididae Tarlo, 1962
  - Genus Psammolepis Agassiz, 1845
- Family Psammosteidae Traquair, 1896
  - Subfamily Placosteinae Glinskiy, 2017
    - Genus Placosteus Agassiz, 1845
  - Subfamily Psammosteinae Traquair, 1896
    - Genus Elgaia Glinskiy, 2017
    - Genus Psammosteus Agassiz, 1844
    - Genus Karelosteus Obruchev, 1933
    - Genus Traquairosteus Tarlo, 1964
  - Subfamily incertae sedis
    - Genus Vladimirolepis Glinskiy, 2017
- Family incertae sedis
  - Genus Schizosteus Obruchev, 1940
  - Genus Tartuosteus Obruchev, 1961

==== Phylogeny ====
An analysis by Glinskiy in 2017 obtained the following phylogenetic tree by strict consensus:

- Psammosteoidei
  - Drepanaspis juvenile specimen
  - - Drepanaspis gemuendenensis
    - - Guerichosteus heterolepis
      - Guerichosteus kozlowskii
      - - 'Schizosteus' perneri
        - - Obrucheviidae
            - Obruchevia
            - Perscheia
          - - Pycnosteidae
              - Ganosteus
              - Pycnolepis
            - - Schizosteus striatus
              - Schizosteus asatkini
              - Tartuosteus
              - Psammolepididae
                Psammolepis
              - Psammosteidae
                - Vladimirolepis
                - - Placosteinae
                    Placosteus
                  - Psammosteinae
                    - Elgaia
                    - - Psammosteus maeandrinus
                      - Psammosteus praecursor
                      - Psammosteus bergi
                      - - Psammosteus levis
                        - Psammosteus cuneatus
                        - Psammosteus megalopteryx
                        - - Psammosteus tenuis
                          - - Karelosteus
                            - Psammosteus asper
                            - Psammosteus livonicus
                            - Traquairosteus ?

=== External relationships ===
A 2025 comprehensive analysis on pteraspidomorph relationships by Randle et al. retained the placement of Psammosteoidei within Pteraspidiformes, with Anchipteraspididae as the deepest branching Pteraspidiformes.
