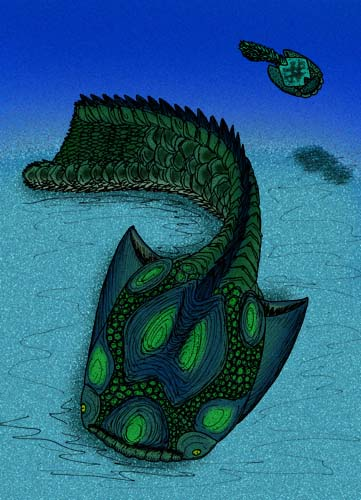
- D. gemuendenensis reconstruction.
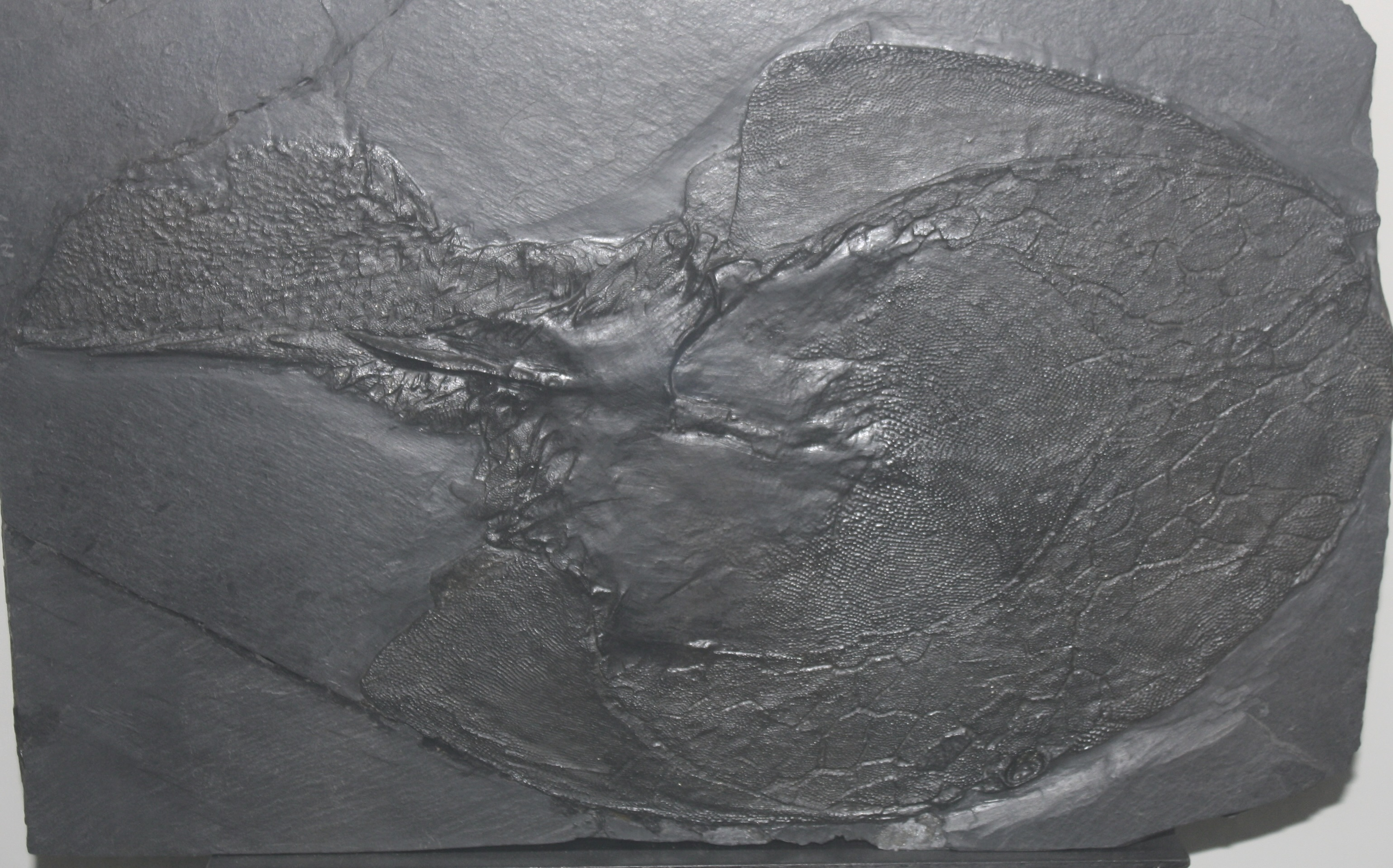
- D. gemuendenensis from Gemunden, Eifel, Germany.

Scientific classification
- Kingdom: Animalia
- Phylum: Chordata
- Infraphylum: Agnatha
- Class: †Pteraspidomorpha
- Subclass: †Heterostraci
- Order: †Pteraspidiformes
- Suborder: †Psammosteida
- Family: †Drepanaspididae; Traquair, 1899
- Genus: †Drepanaspis; Schlüter, 1887

Type species
- Drepanaspis gemuendenensis Schlüter, 1887

Species
- D. gemuendenensis Schlüter, 1887; D. sehrieli Gross, 1933; D. lipperti Gross, 1937; D. jaegeri Tarlo, 1964; D. earteri (McCoY, 1851); D. edwardsi Tarlo, 1964

= Drepanaspis =

Drepanaspis Temporal range: Early Devonian

Extinct genus of jawless fishes

Drepanaspis (from Greek: δρεπάνη drepánē 'sickle' and Greek: ἀσπίς aspís 'shield') is an extinct genus of heterostracan armoured jawless fish from the Early Devonian (approximately 416 - 397 mya). Drepanaspis are assumed to have lived primarily in marine environments and is most commonly characterized by their ray-like, heavily armoured bodies, along with their lack of paired fins and jaws.

== History and discovery ==
The first fossils of the genus Drepanaspis, scientifically known as D. gemuendenensis of Schlüter, were found in 1887 from the Gemünden slate in the Hunsrück lagerstätte of Rhineland, Germany and was first described by Clemens August Schlüter. These fossils were also most notably studied and described by Scottish palaeoichthyologist Ramsay H. Traquair who created the first outline restorations from articulated specimens of Drepanaspis.

A second species of Drepanaspis, D. sehrieli, would later be discovered, followed by a third species produced by the Clervaux Formation, D. lipperti, found near Zweifelscheid, and Willwerath, Germany. Both species were first described by Walter R. Gross in 1933 and 1937 respectively.

More specimens of Drepanaspis would later be uncovered in 2004, in the Lower Devonian subdivision of the Ardenne Massif in Belgium and Luxembourg, specifically within the Emsian Oesling, by Alain Bleick and his team. This discovery would lead to a new geographical record of the genus, dating to the middle-upper Emsian period.

=== Notable Historical Debates ===
Previously, the method of using specific arrangements of the lateral line sensory canals to identify the well characterized cyathaspidid and pteraspidid species were applied to psammosteids, but proved not to be useful. At the time, psammosteids were not well characterized morphologically due to a lack of specimens with distinct sensory canal features, but the discovery of sensory lines in a new Late Devonian obrucheviid psammosteid and another new species, along with the identification of radial ridges of dorsal and ventral plates of D. gemuendenensis as sensory line canals, were able to alleviate the issue and provide significant morphological information in the area.

However, when the identification of radial ridges of dorsal and ventral plates of D. gemuendenensis as sensory line canals were made by W. Gross in 1963, it sparked some debate from paleontologists Obruchev and Halstead Tarlo. Obruchev and Halstead Tarlo argued that the interpretation of these structures were incorrect as they were too symmetrical and situated on the visceral surface of the plates. This debate would continue until the discovery of a specimen from the Odenspiel quarry in Rhineland, Germany that contained two incomplete dorsal plates, two branchial plates and several fragments of D. gemuendenensis pointing to Gross as the one with the correct observation.

== Description ==
Drepanaspis was a small, flattened fish with a heavily armored body that ranged from 10 to 30 cm long in size. The presence of widely spaced eyes, sensory canals, and its flattened morphology suggests that these fish may have been bottom feeders that foraged the ocean floor for food. Interestingly, Drepanaspis also has a dorsally oriented mouth opening which is a distinct feature that separates the genus from its other heterostracan relatives.

=== Carapace ===
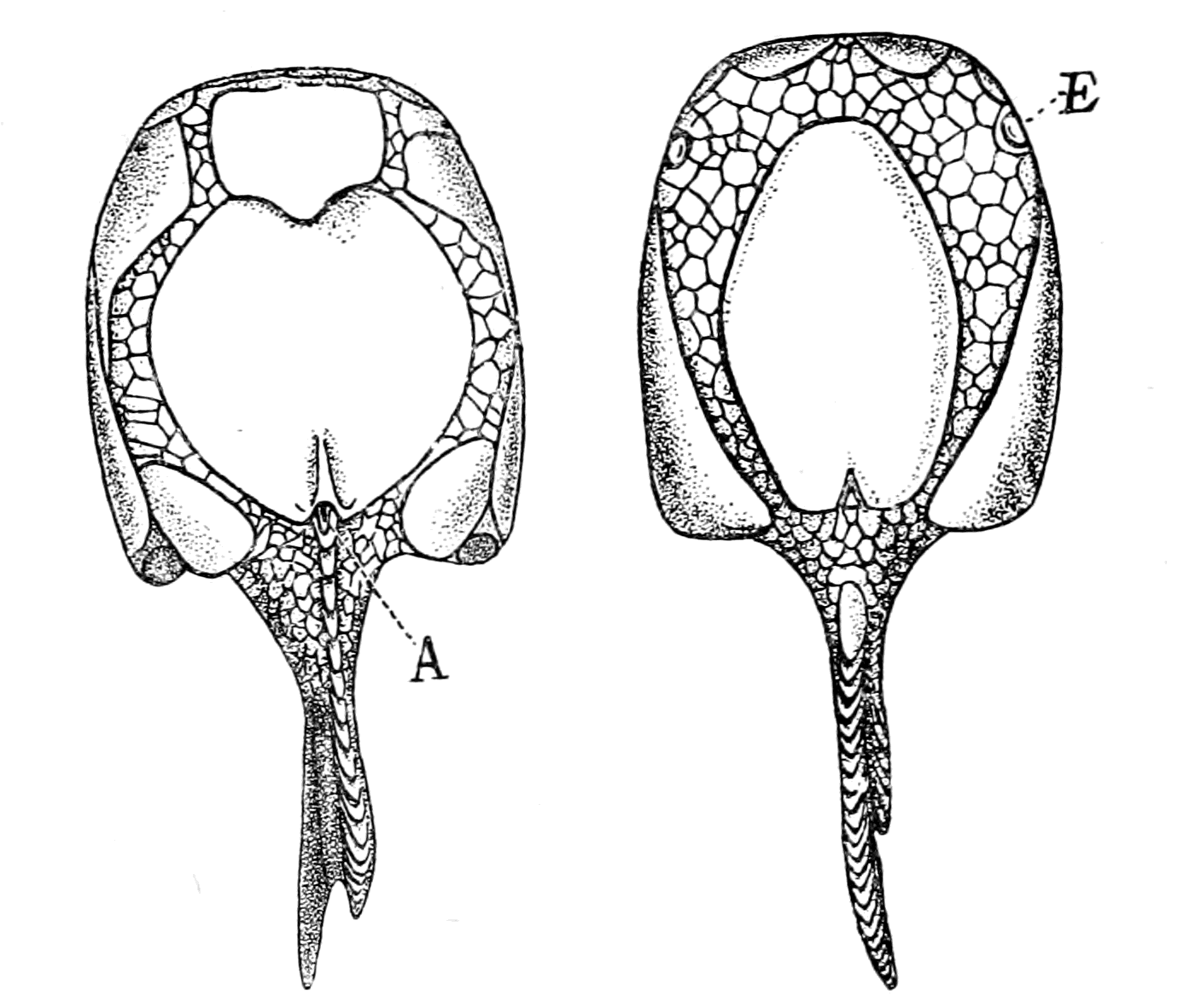
1908 diagram depicting the ventral (left) and dorsal (right) sides of Drepanaspis's carapace. (A) anus, (E) eyes.

The carapace of Drepanaspis is described to be broad, depressed, and very obtusely rounded at the front, consisting of a ventral and dorsal shield made up of several overlapping plates or scales. These scales, or tubercles, cover a large majority of the carapace in a characteristic v-shape pattern, with approximately 8.5 tubercles per cm aligned naturally to the edge of the plate, which can be used to identify a specimen's symmetry plane. Although these v-shaped tubercles are a distinct characteristic of Drepanaspis, a similar feature have been observed in other psammostean shields, indicating that this genus may have been the ancestor to the giant, meter long and wide psammosteid heterostracans of the Late Devonian.

The dorsal shield portion of the Drepanaspis carapace contains a large median plate that is acutely notched at the posterior end. In addition, forming most of the exterior margin of the shield along the posterior end lies long, elongated, and pointed plates called postero-lateral or cornual plates.

=== Sensory Canal ===
Like their close Heterostracan relatives, members of Drepanaspis have a sensory canal system specifically called the lateral line sensory system. This complex network of closed canals within the dermal plates is thought to be a derived trait known in very few Psammosteids and are characteristically symmetrical in arrangement, often leading to the surface by pores. These sensory organs, when found in extant species of fish, are tubes and canals rich in neuromasts shown to be important in detecting changes in water pressure and movement, along with influencing some of their behavioral patterns. It can be seen in specimens, such as the one discovered from the Odenspiel quarry in Rhineland, Germany, that the lateral line sensory system lies under the dorsal plate of Drepanaspis, situated above its smooth and extremely thin basal layer. This is evident from the observation of shallow, asymmetrical ridges divided into two parts by a fine groove.

=== Oral Opening ===
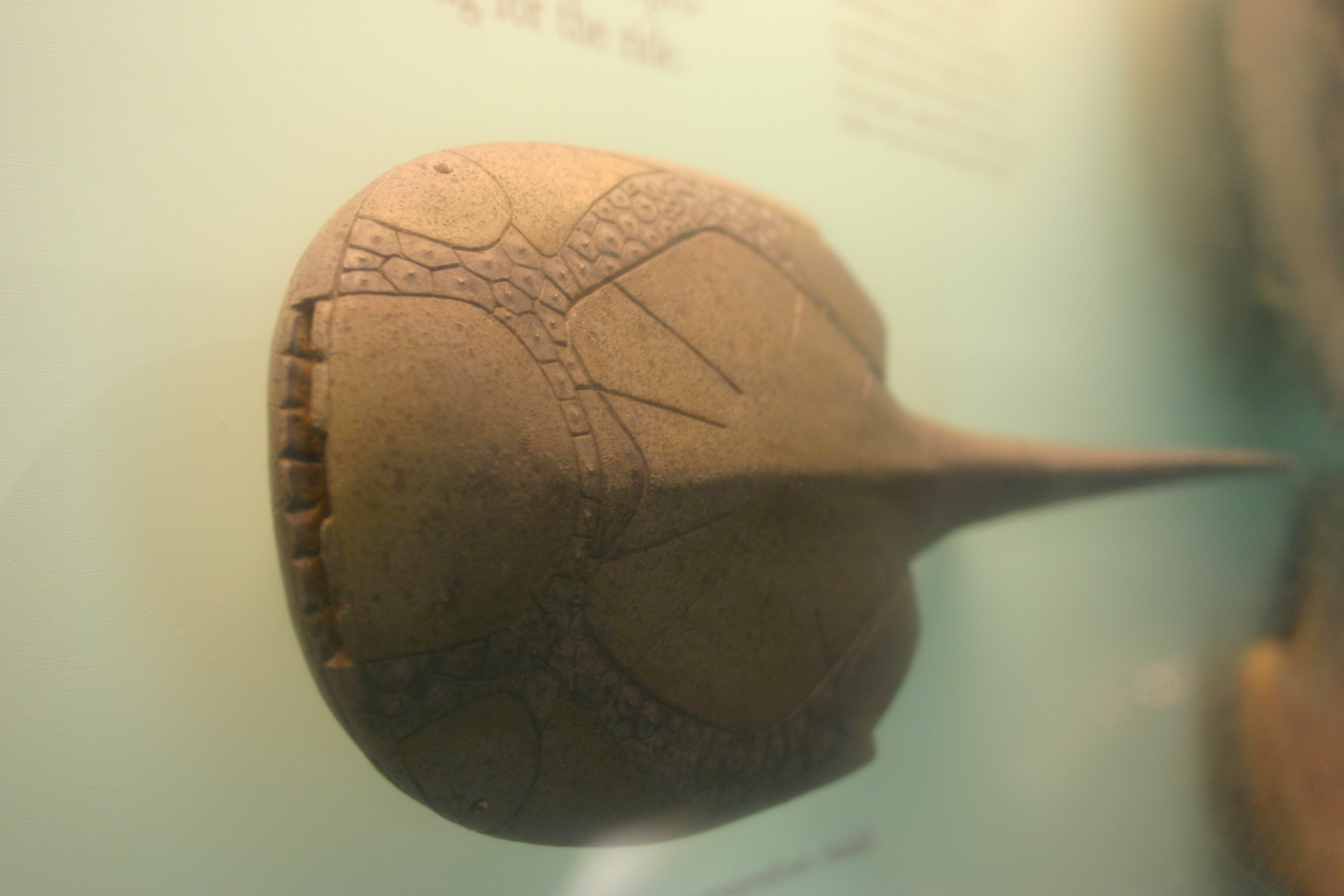
D. gemuendenensis reconstruction, depicting a dorsal mouth opening at the front of the specimen. At the Smithsonian National Museum of Natural History.

The jawless mouth of Drepanaspis is terminal and located on the dorsal surface of the carapace. The opening of the mouth is lined with very fine denticles, similar to those of Pteraspis. These denticles, that would continue up into the inner margins of the mouth, allowed Drepanaspis to suck up and grasp food or prey using a mechanism called suction feeding. These specific features of the mouth are what indicates the likelihood of Drepanaspis being a bottom feeder that would often dwell near the bottom of a shallow body of water.

Initially, there was some debate regarding the dorsal orientation of the mouth opening, specifically on whether such an orientation was natural or due to crushing of the specimen. Based on the arrangement of the mouth, which showed that the upper side of the mouth is bound by the rostral plate and the lower side was bounded by small oral plates, it was determined that the dorsal orientation was most likely natural. No evidence of distortion in the ventral surface or tooth plates of fossil specimens were visibly found.

== Paleobiology ==
=== Paleoenvironment ===
A large majority of the first Drepanaspis specimens were found in the Gemünden slate in the Hunsrück lagerstätte of Rhineland, Germany. The fauna of the Hunsrück lagerstätte consisted of trilobites, mailed fish, bivalves, cephalopods, and other Late Devonian marine lifeforms. The predominantly diverse range of marine fauna found within these slate formations strongly indicate that the members of Drepanaspis are of marine origin.

Hunsrück lagerstätte, the primary slate formation of which Drepanaspis is most commonly found, are of Early Devonian age, and is thought to have deposited during the Late Pragian to Early Esmian Ages in subsiding basins that were separated by swells. These slate deposits were estimated to be 4,000 meters in thickness and ran for about 150 kilometers from the northwest to southeast direction. It was estimated, through observations of well-developed eyes of arthropod and vertebrate specimens recovered from the slate formation, that the water depth of the offshore environment was estimated to be rather shallow, only ranging from 40–60 meters in depth. It was based on these sedimentary observations that the conclusion of Drepanaspis having lived in shallow water environments, such as shallow seas, coral reefs, or lakes, can be drawn.

=== Feeding ecology ===
Members of Drepanaspis were most likely nektobenthic, or bottom dwellers, a conclusion based on its flattened morphology and dorsal positioning of its oral opening. With information inferred from extant jawless fish species, it is a common feeding strategy for bottom dwellers to be bottom feeders, suggesting that Drepanaspis may have likely been a bottom feeder.

This same conclusion can also be drawn by observing the anatomical features of its dorsal facing mouth. Due to the jawless nature of the mouth, Drepanaspis may have most likely utilized an aquatic feeding mechanism called suction feeding. The suction feeding mechanism of Drepanaspis was likely a specialized adaptation for feeding on small, benthic invertebrates in shallow marine environments. The edges of the mouth opening is lined with small denticles which allowed for the grasping and retention of food during suction feeding. It has also been hypothesized that these denticles may have also contributed to some degree of mastication.

== Classification ==
Drepanaspis belongs to the clade Drepanaspididae, a subdivision of the family Psammosteida. Psammosteida belongs to the order Pteraspidiformes and class Pteraspidomorphi, which is one of the major classes of the paraphyletic group Ostracodermi.

- Pteraspidomorphi
  - Arandaspida
  - Heterostracomorphi
    - Eroptychiida
    - Heterostraci
      - Traquairaspidiformes
      - Tolypelepidida
        - Pteraspidiformes
        - - Pteraspidina
          - - Doryaspis
            - - Protaspidoidea
              - - Psammosteida
                - - Drepanaspididae
                  - - Drepanaspis
                    - - D. gemuendenensis
                      - D. sehrieli
                      - D. lipperti
                      - D. jaegeri
                      - D. earteri
                      - D. edwardsi

== Gallery ==
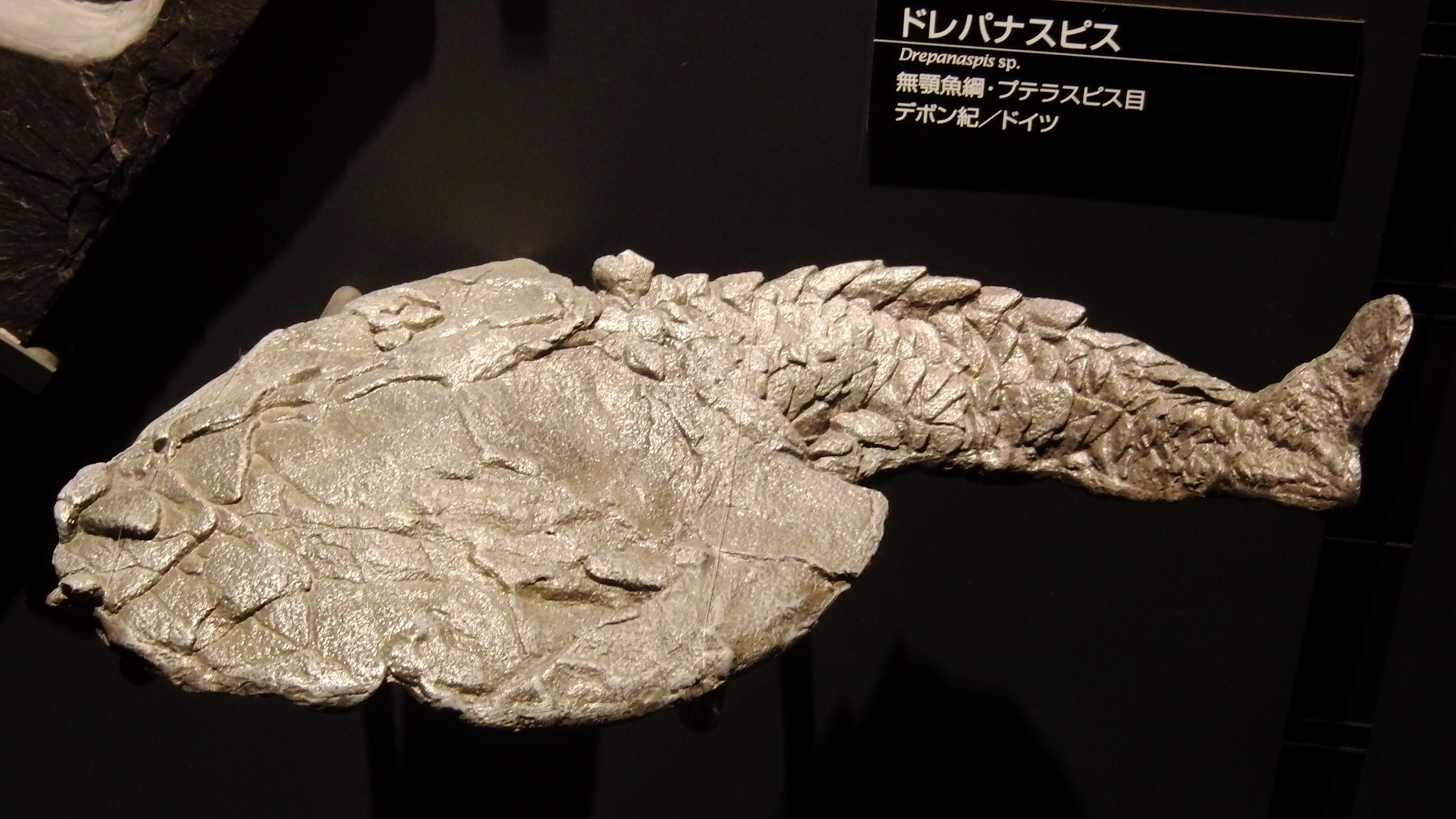
Drepanaspis sp., National Museum of Nature and Science, Tokyo, Japan

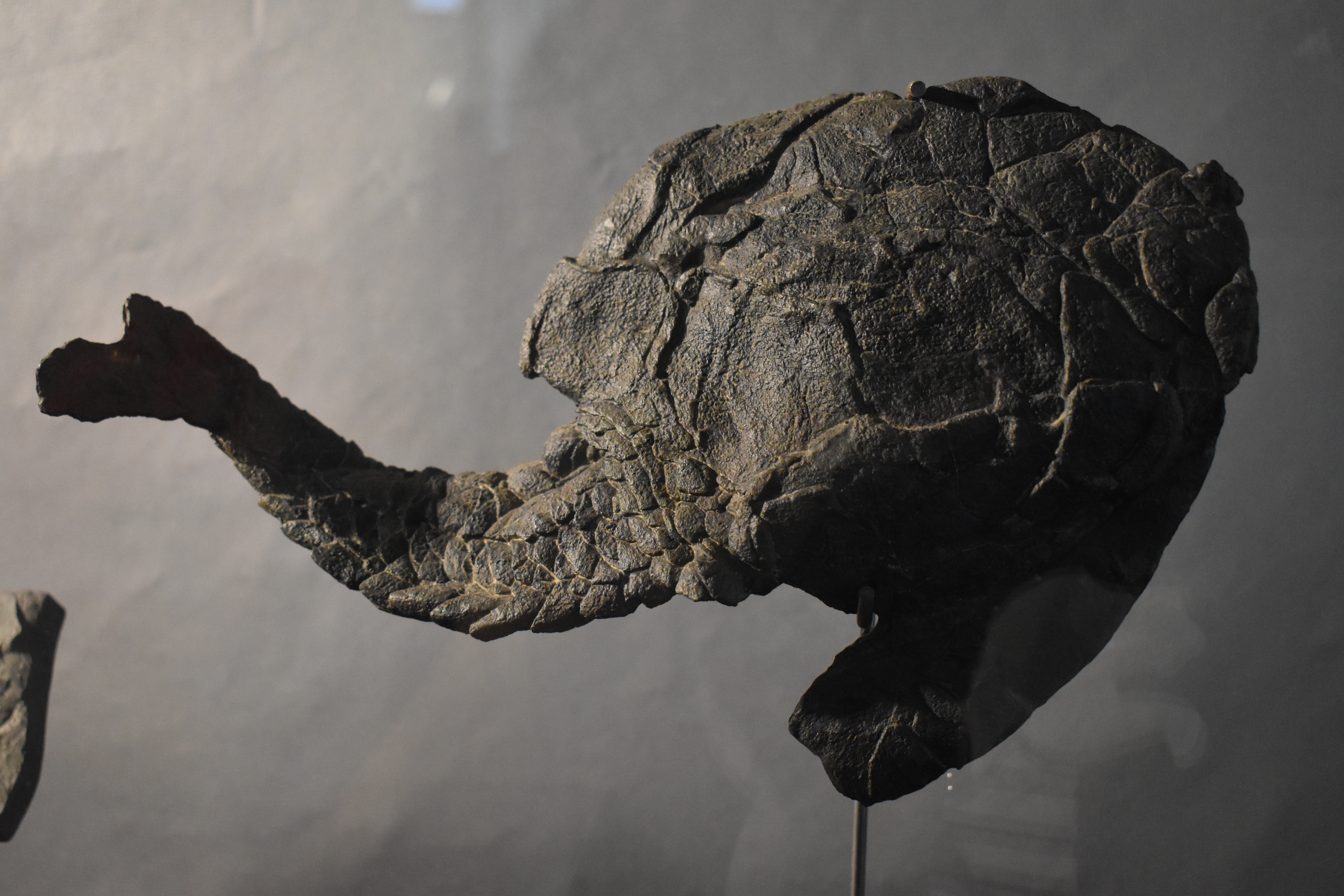
Drepanaspis sp., National Museum of Nature and Science, Tokyo, Japan

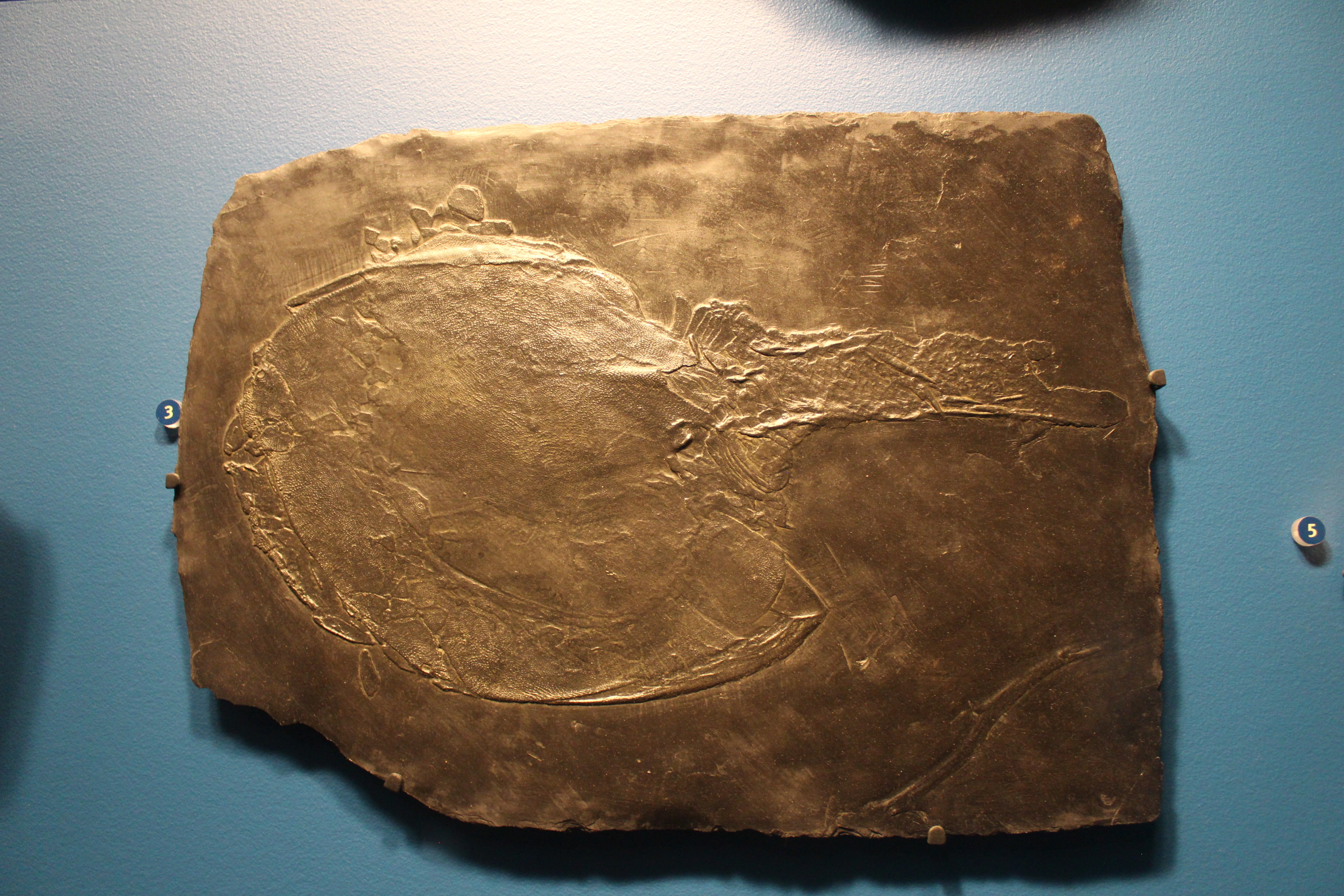
Fossil of Drepanaspis sp. in the Field Museum of Natural History

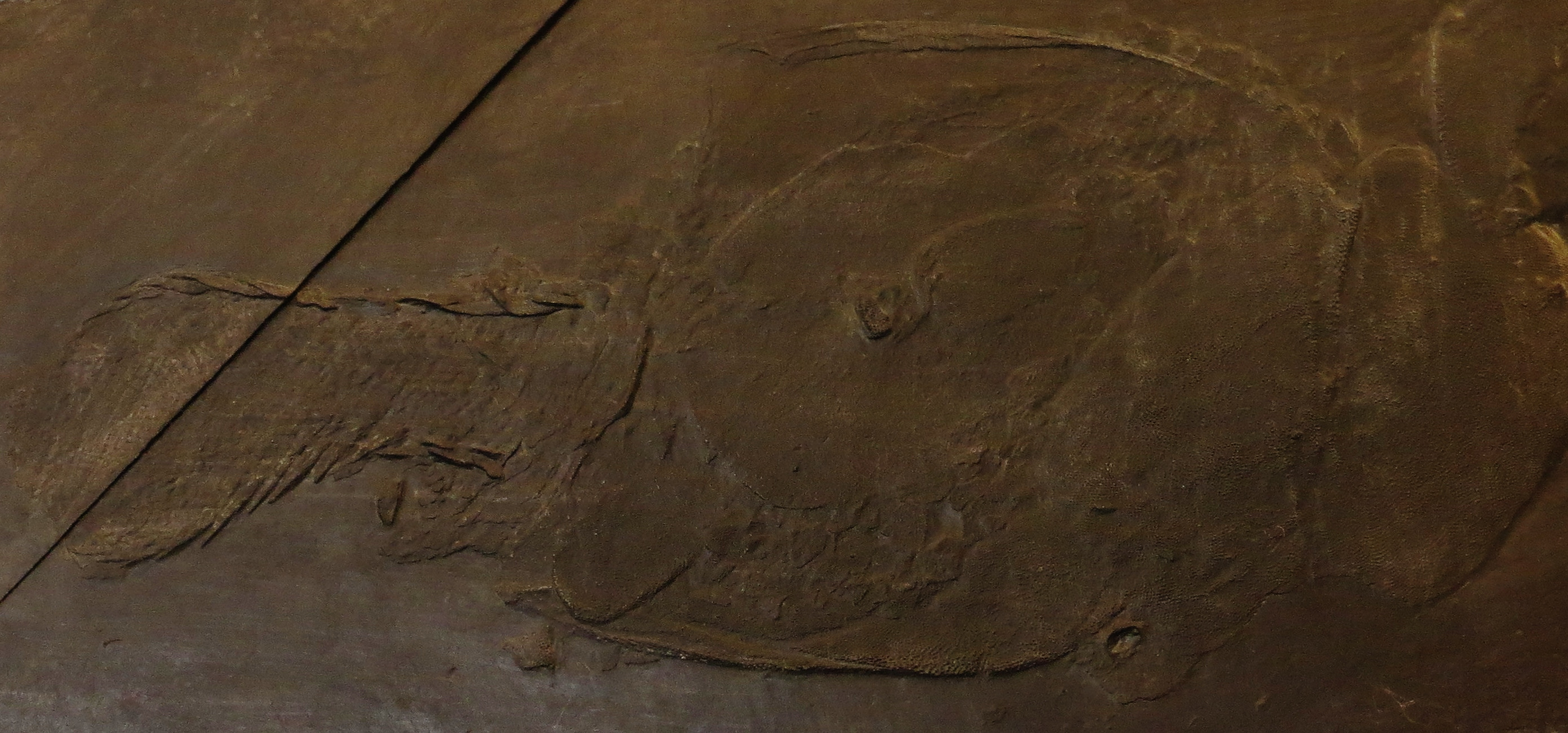
D. gemuendensis

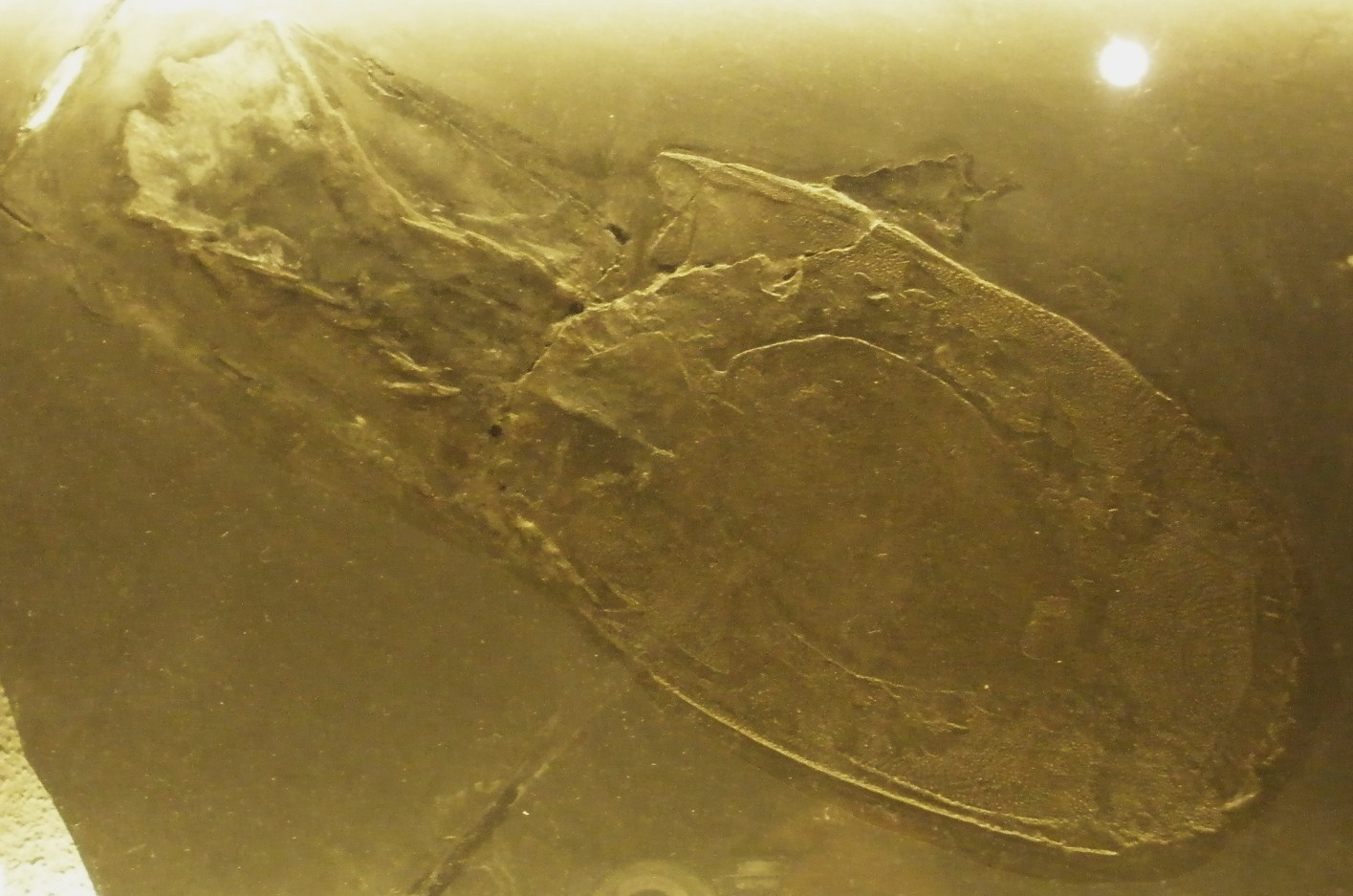
D. gemuendensis, Naturalis museum, Leiden

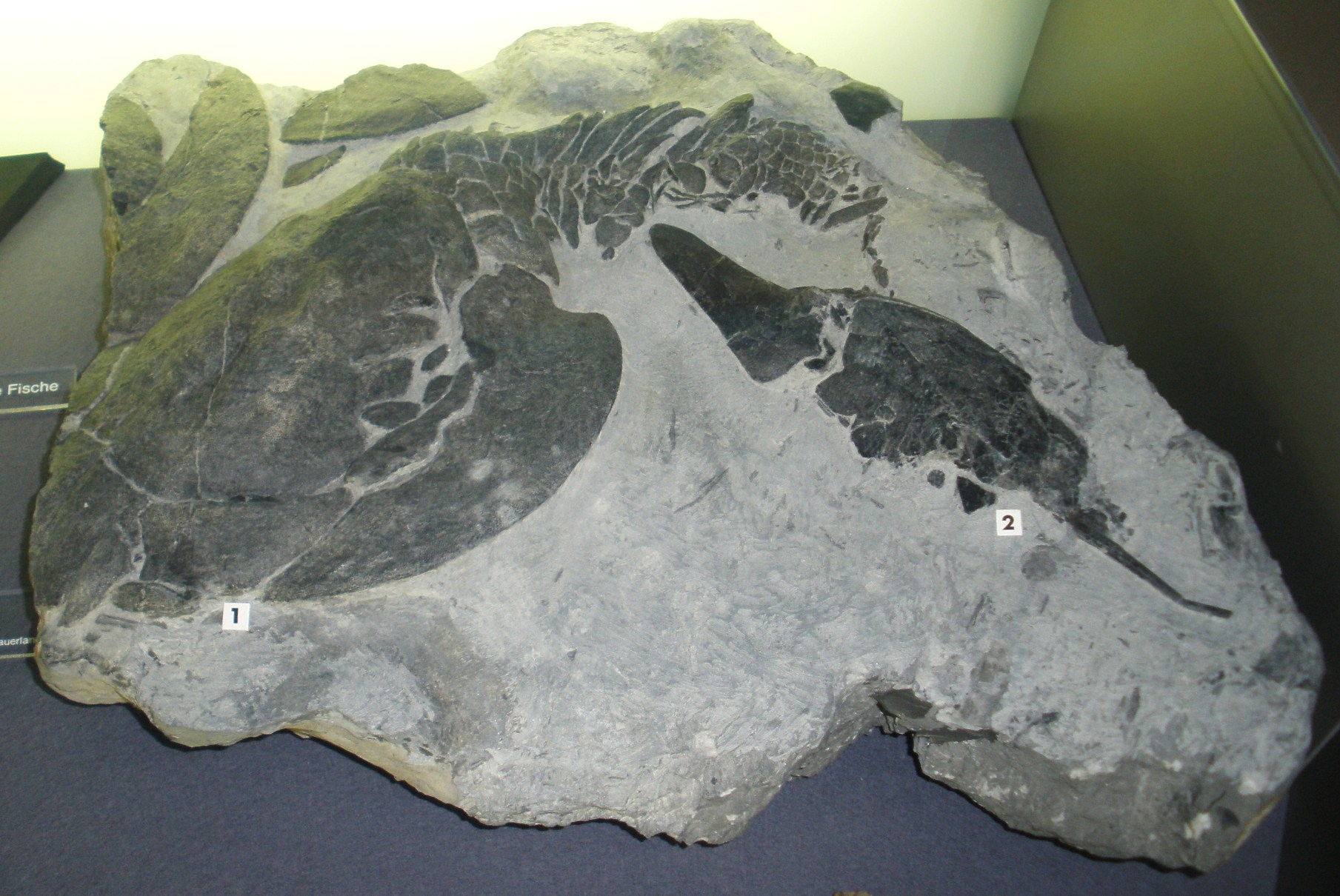
Drepanaspis (1) and Pteraspis (2)

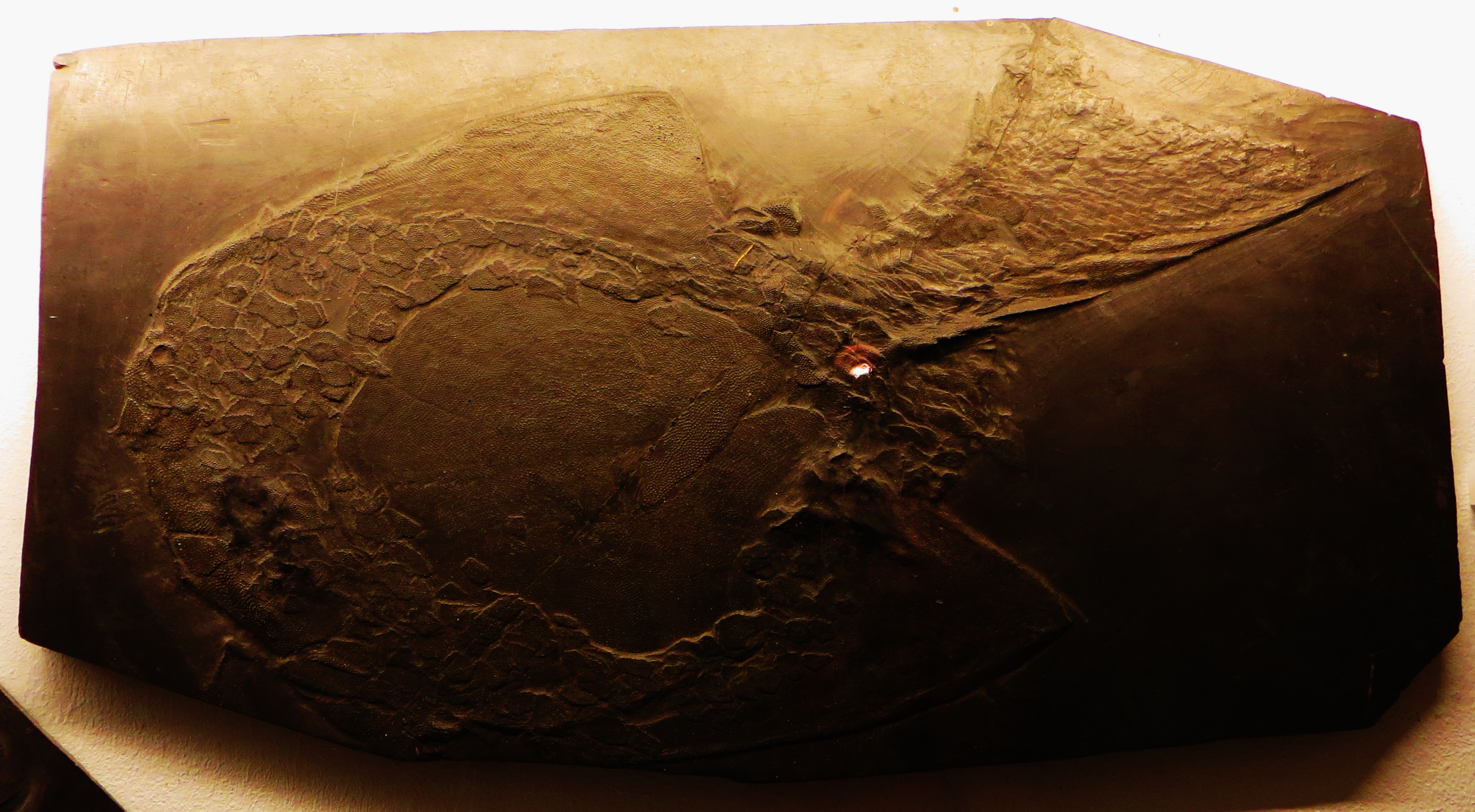
D. gemuendensis, Museum of Paleontology of Tuebingen

== See also ==
- Arandaspis – Extinct genus of Pteraspidomorph fish
- Hemicyclaspis – Extinct genus of jawless fishes
- Sacabambaspis – Extinct genus of jawless fishes
