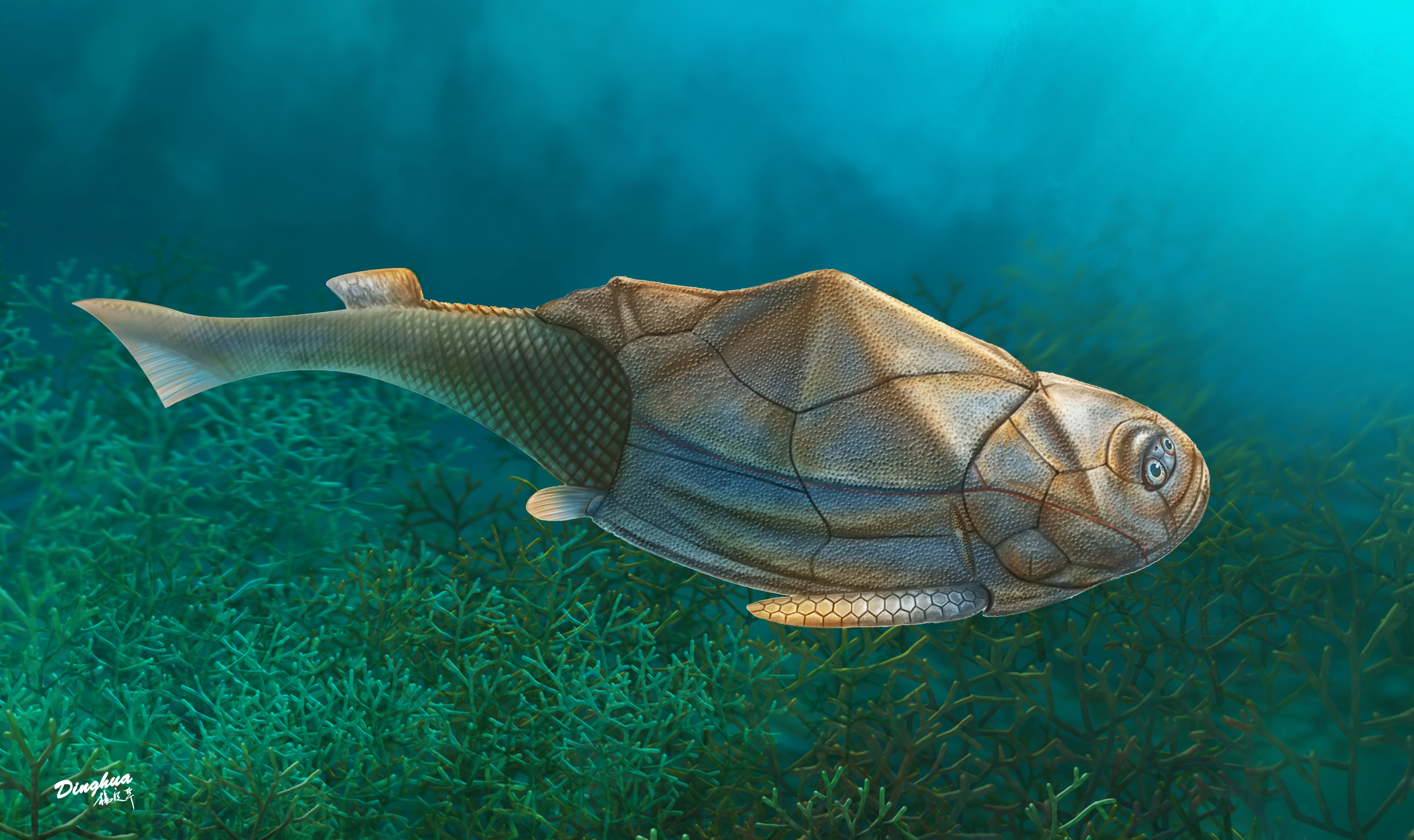
- Phymolepis cuifengshanensis restoration

Scientific classification
- Kingdom: Animalia
- Phylum: Chordata
- Class: †Placodermi
- Order: †Antiarchi
- Family: †Yunnanolepididae
- Genus: †Phymolepis; Zhang, 1978

Type species
- †Phymolepis cuifengshanensis Zhang, 1978

Other species
- †P. guoruii Zhu, 1996

= Phymolepis =

Phymolepis Temporal range: Early Devonian, Lochkovian

Extinct genus of fishes

Phymolepis is an extinct genus of yunnanolepidid placoderm from the Early Devonian of China. The type species, P. cuifengshanensis, was named by Zhang Goroui in 1978 and was re-evaluated in 2018, while a second species, P. guoruii, was named and described in 1996.

The holotype of P. cuifengshanensis is IVPP V4225.3, a nearly complete trunk shield, and it was found in the Xitun Formation, near Cuifengshan. The paratype is IVPP V4425.6, a posterior median dorsal plate, and several other specimens of varying completeness have also been referred to Phymolepis, with some specimens also being recovered from the Xishancun Formation.
