= Archaeotriakis =

Archaeotriakis Temporal range: Campanian

Scientific classification
- Domain: Eukaryota
- Kingdom: Animalia
- Phylum: Chordata
- Class: Chondrichthyes
- Subclass: Elasmobranchii
- Division: Selachii
- Order: Carcharhiniformes
- Family: Pseudotriakidae
- Genus: †Archaeotriakis; Case, 1978

Species
- †Archaeotriakis rochelleae; †Archaeotriakis ornatus

Extinct genus of false catshark

Archaeotriakis is an extinct genus of false catshark from the Cretaceous period. Currently, this genus is restricted to the Campanian stage of the Western Interior Seaway of North America. It is known from two species, mainly from isolated teeth. A. rochelleae was described from the Judith River Formation of Montana, USA. A. ornatus was originally described from the Teapot Member of the Mesaverde Group of Wyoming, USA. The range of A. ornatus has since been found in the Bearpaw formation of Alberta, Canada.
