= Danogaleus =

Danogaleus Temporal range: Cretaceous–Paleocene, 66–61.6 Ma

Scientific classification
- Domain: Eukaryota
- Kingdom: Animalia
- Phylum: Chordata
- Class: Chondrichthyes
- Subclass: Elasmobranchii
- Division: Selachii
- Order: Carcharhiniformes
- Genus: †Danogaleus; Noubhani and Cappetta 1997

Extinct genus of sharks (fossil)

Danogaleus is an extinct genus of ground shark. It lived during the Cretaceous and Paleogene.
