= Fornicatus =

Fornicatus Temporal range: Valanginian

Scientific classification
- Domain: Eukaryota
- Kingdom: Animalia
- Phylum: Chordata
- Class: Chondrichthyes
- Subclass: Elasmobranchii
- Division: Selachii
- Order: Carcharhiniformes
- Family: incertae sedis
- Genus: †Fornicatus; Fuchs, Engelbrecht, Lukeneder & Kriwet, 2018
- Species: †F. austriacus

Binomial name
- †Fornicatus austriacus Fuchs et al., 2018

Extinct genus of sharks

Fornicatus is an extinct genus of ground shark from the Early Cretaceous age of Austria. There is only one known species, F. austriacus, named by Iris Fuchs in 2018. It was related to Altusmirus.
