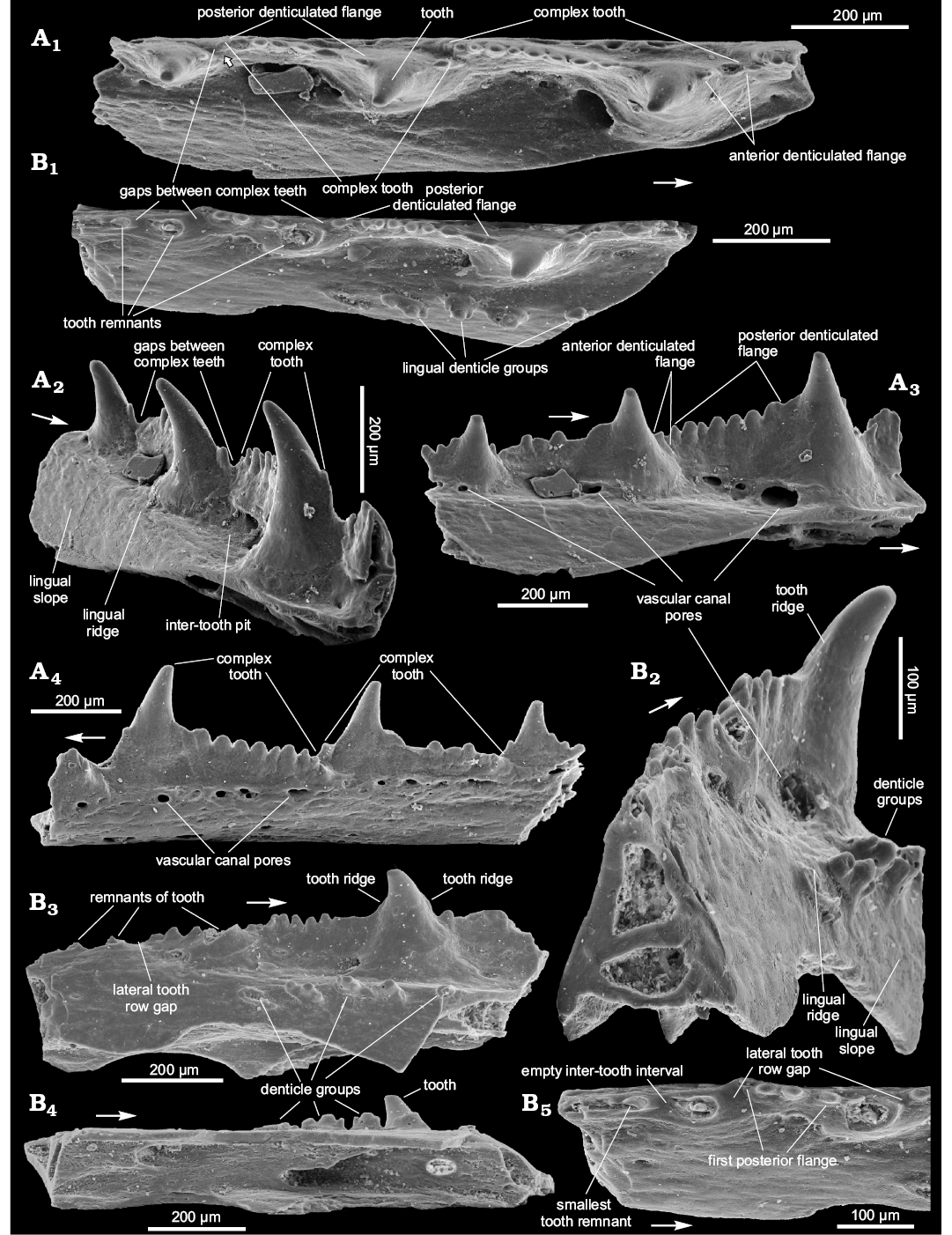
- Holotype and paratype jaw bone fragments

Scientific classification
- Kingdom: Animalia
- Phylum: Chordata
- Class: †Acanthodii
- Order: †Ischnacanthiformes
- Family: †Podoliacanthidae
- Genus: †Kasperacanthus
- Species: †K. serratus

Binomial name
- †Kasperacanthus serratus Voichyshyn & Szaniawski, 2018

= Kasperacanthus =

Kasperacanthus Temporal range: Early Devonian

Extinct genus of cartilaginous fishes

Kasperacanthus is an extinct genus of podoliacanthid that lived during the Early Devonian epoch.

== Distribution ==
Kasperacanthus serratus is known from Ukraine.
