= Drake Bay Formation =

Geologic formation in California, United States

The Drake Bay Formation is a Pliocene stratigraphic unit in California. In 1993, paleontologists excavated a whale skeleton associated with fossil shark teeth and fish vertebrae that may have belonged to a giant salmon from Drake Bay sediments at Point Reyes National Seashore.
