= Cristabatis =

Cristabatis Temporal range: Toarcian

Scientific classification
- Kingdom: Animalia
- Phylum: Chordata
- Class: Chondrichthyes
- Subclass: Elasmobranchii
- Family: †Toarcibatidae
- Genus: †Cristabatis; Delsate & Candoni, 2001

Type species
- †Cristabatis exundans Delsate & Candoni, 2001

Other species
- †Cristabatis crescentiformis Delsate & Candoni, 2001

Extinct genus of rays

Cristabatis is an extinct genus of rays that lived during the Early Jurassic. It contains two valid species, C. exundans and C. crescentiformis, which have been found in Belgium and France. It was originally referred to the family "Archaeobatidae", but was later reassigned to the family Toarcibatidae.
