= Acutalamna =

Acutalamna Temporal range: Albian –Cenomanian

Scientific classification
- Kingdom: Animalia
- Phylum: Chordata
- Class: Chondrichthyes
- Subclass: Elasmobranchii
- Division: Selachii
- Order: Lamniformes
- Genus: †Acutalamna; Guinot & Carrillo-Briceño, 2018
- Species: †A. karsteni

Binomial name
- †Acutalamna karsteni Guinot & Carrillo-Briceño, 2018

Extinct genus of shark

Acutalamna is an extinct genus of mackerel shark from the Cretaceous period. It contains a singular species, A. karsteni. The type locality is the La Luna formation of Venezuela, but teeth have been found in France, Peru, Ecuador, and Lithuania. It is possible these teeth represent new species within this genus. Teeth included in this genus were originally attributed to "Priscusurus adruptodontus". The holotype and some of type series of this species were found to be indeterminate Squalicorax teeth, thus rendering it a nomen dubium. Other teeth in the type series of "P. adruptodontus" are indeterminate members of Acutalamna. It bears resemblance to both Anacoracids and Cretoxyrhinids, but has yet to be confidently ascribed to any family.
