= Platylithophycus =

Platylithophycus Temporal range: Coniacian-Campanian

Scientific classification
- Domain: Eukaryota
- Kingdom: Animalia
- Phylum: Chordata
- Class: Chondrichthyes
- Subclass: Elasmobranchii
- Genus: †Platylithophycus; Johnson & Howell, 1948
- Species: †P. cretaceus

Binomial name
- †Platylithophycus cretaceus Johnson & Howell, 1948

Extinct genus of elasmobranchs

Platylithophycus is an extinct genus of elasmobranchs that lived during the Late Cretaceous. It is known from a single specimen from the Niobrara Formation of Kansas, United States. It was originally identified as the fronds of a codiacean alga, then later as the cuttlebone of a cuttlefish. It was most recently reidentified as the gill arches and rakers of an elasmobranch of uncertain affinities. It might have been a filter feeding mackerel shark related to Aquilolamna.
