= Faberaspis =

Faberaspis Temporal range: Lochkovian

Scientific classification
- Kingdom: Animalia
- Phylum: Chordata
- Infraphylum: Agnatha
- Class: †Pteraspidomorpha
- Subclass: †Heterostraci
- Order: †Cyathaspidiformes
- Family: †Cyathaspididae
- Genus: †Faberaspis
- Species: †F. elgae

Binomial name
- †Faberaspis elgae Elliott et al., 2018

Extinct genus of cyathaspidid fish

Faberaspis is an extinct monotypic genus of cyathaspidid fish that lived in what is now Prince of Wales Island during the Lochkovian stage of the Early Devonian epoch.

== Etymology ==
The generic name Faberaspis is derived from the Latin word faber, meaning smith, in reference to Smith Bay, and the Greek word aspis, meaning shield. The specific epithet of the type and only species, Faberaspis elgae, honours the palaeontologist Elga Mark-Kurik for her studies of early vertebrates.
