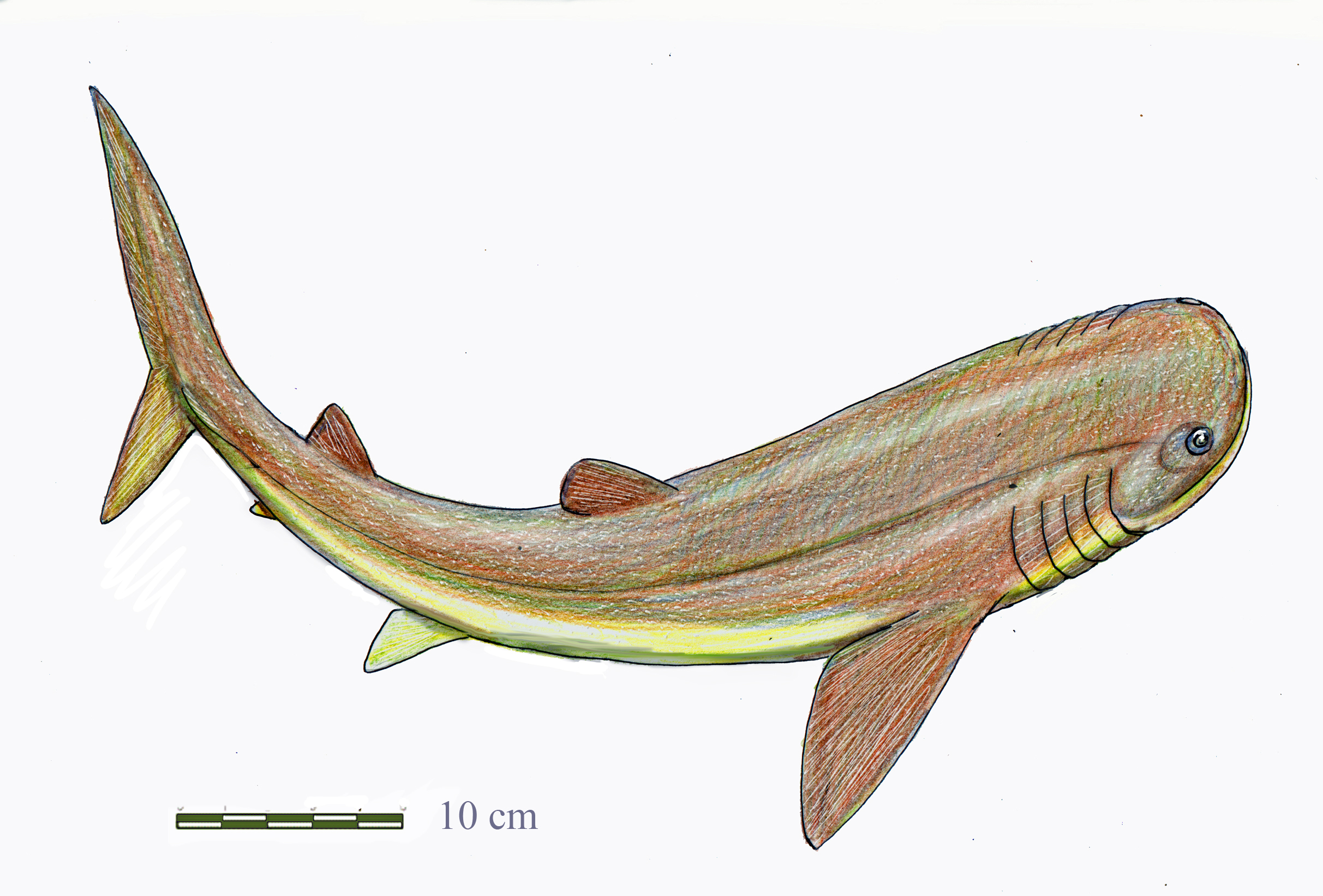
- Restoration

Scientific classification
- Kingdom: Animalia
- Phylum: Chordata
- Class: Chondrichthyes
- Order: incertae sedis
- Genus: †Gladbachus; Heidtke & Krätschmer, 2001
- Species: †G. adentatus

Binomial name
- †Gladbachus adentatus Heidtke & Krätschmer, 2001

= Gladbachus =

Gladbachus Temporal range: Middle Devonian

Extinct genus of cartilaginous fishes

Gladbachus is a possible genus of extinct chondrichthyan from the Middle Devonian Lower Plattenkalk of Germany.

== Discovery and naming ==
The holotype, UMZC 2000.32, was discovered in the Lower Plattenkalk of Unterthal, Bergisch Gladbach, Germany and it consists of a partial skull which has been compressed. Gladbachus adentatus was named and described by Heidtke & Krätschmer (2001).

The holotype was redescribed by Coates et al. (2018).

== Description ==
Gladbachus has been estimated to reach around 80 centimetres (31 in) long when fully grown.
