= Toarcibatis =

Toarcibatis Temporal range: Toarcian

Scientific classification
- Kingdom: Animalia
- Phylum: Chordata
- Class: Chondrichthyes
- Subclass: Elasmobranchii
- Family: †Toarcibatidae
- Genus: †Toarcibatis; Delsate & Candoni, 2001

Type species
- †Toarcibatis elongata Delsate & Candoni, 2001

Other species
- †Toarcibatis alticarinata Delsate & Candoni, 2001; †Toarcibatis brevicristata Delsate & Candoni, 2001; †Toarcibatis multicristata Delsate & Candoni, 2001

Extinct genus of rays

Toarcibatis is an extinct genus of rays that lived during the Early Jurassic. It contains four valid species which have been found in Belgium, France, Luxembourg, and Spain. It was originally referred to the family "Archaeobatidae", but the family would eventually be renamed "Toarcibatidae" to conform with ICZN rules.
