= Tartuosteus =

Tartuosteus Temporal range: Givetian–Frasnian

Scientific classification
- Kingdom: Animalia
- Phylum: Chordata
- Infraphylum: Agnatha
- Class: †Pteraspidomorpha
- Subclass: †Heterostraci
- Order: †Pteraspidiformes
- Suborder: †Psammosteida
- Genus: †Tartuosteus; Obruchev, 1961

Type species
- Psammolepis gigantea Gross, 1933

Extinct genus of jawless fishes

Tartuosteus is an extinct genus of jawless fish from the Devonian of Eastern Europe. It is notable for its large size in comparison to other Ostracoderms, reaching a width of 1.5 m (4.9 ft).

== Description ==
Like other Psammosteid Heterostracans, Tartuosteus had a broad and flattened body which was almost as wide as it was long, being 1 meter wide and an estimated 1.5 meters long. This impressive width is owed to its extended branchials, which are large wing-like bony fins extending from the body. The branchials of Tartuosteus form a boomerang-like shape, while the center of the body dips deeply into a keel-like protrusion.

These branchials are so large that when measured for the amount of lift they can produce, its lift-to-drag ratio is comparable to that of a jet airplane. This lift force would provide Tartuosteus with an efficient cruising ability while reducing maneuverability. This suggests that Tartuosteus was effective at exploiting widely distributed food sources, possibly plankton in the water column, or at escaping predation.

== Species ==
Tartuosteus has a somewhat convoluted taxonomic past, with species being lumped into and out of the genus and others being declared based on poor remains. There are two species which are unproblematically members of the genus.

- T. giganteus (Gross, 1933)
- T. maximus Mark-Kurik, 1965

There are also two species which are problematically members of the genus, but are based on poor remains. Elgaia luhai was formerly a member of the genus, but is now considered to be separate.

- T.? (Rohonosteus) ornatus Rohon, 1899
- T.? zheleznogorskensis Moloshnikov, 2009

== See also ==
- Pycnosteus
