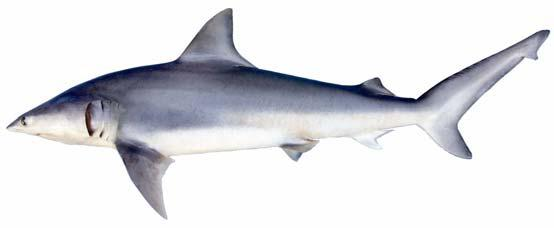
- A finetooth shark, Carcharhinus isodon

Scientific classification
- Kingdom: Animalia
- Phylum: Chordata
- Class: Chondrichthyes
- Subclass: Elasmobranchii
- Division: Selachii
- Superorder: Galeomorphi
- Order: Carcharhiniformes; Compagno, 1977

= Carcharhiniformes =

Ground sharks Temporal range: Bathonian–present

Order of sharks

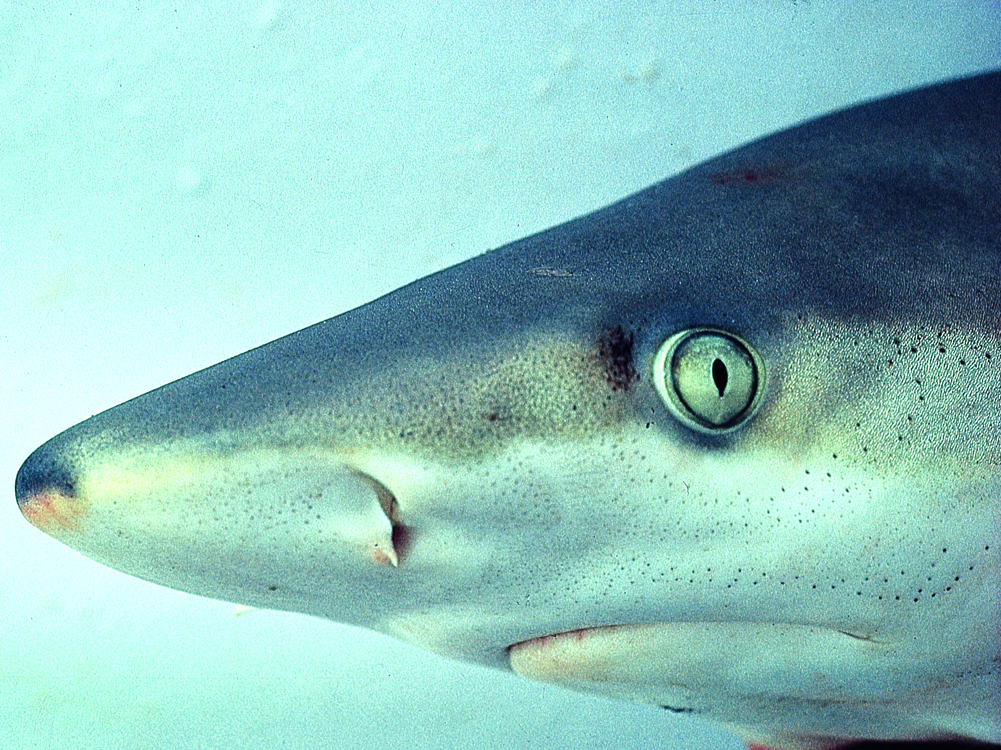
Ground sharks, like this blacknose shark, have a nictitating membrane which can be drawn over the eye to protect it.

Carcharhiniformes (/ˌkɑːrkəˌraɪnɪˈfɔːrmiːz/; from Ancient Greek καρχαρός (karkharós) 'sharp, jagged', ῥινός (rhinós) 'nose' and Latin forme 'shape'), commonly called ground sharks, are the largest order of sharks, with over 270 species. They include a number of common types, such as cat sharks, swellsharks, and hound sharks.

Members of this order are characterized by the presence of a nictitating membrane over the eye, two dorsal fins, an anal fin, and five gill slits.

The families in the order Carcharhiniformes are expected to be revised; recent DNA studies show that some of the conventional groups are not monophyletic.

The oldest members of the order appeared during the Middle-Late Jurassic, which have teeth and body forms that are morphologically similar to living catsharks. Carchariniformes first underwent major diversification during the Late Cretaceous, initially as mostly small-sized forms, before radiating into medium and large body sizes during the Cenozoic.

== Families ==
Eschmeyer's Catalog of Fishes classifies the Carcharhiniformes into two suborders and twelve families:

- Suborder Scyliorhinoidei
  - Family Scyliorhinidae Gill, 1862 (catsharks)
- Suborder Carcharhinoidei
  - Family Atelomycteridae E. G. White, 1936 (coloured catsharks)
  - Family Pentanchidae Smith, 1912 (deepwater catsharks)
  - Family Dichichthyidae W. T. White, Stewart, Reuben O'Neill & Naylor, 2024 (bristle sharks)
  - Family Pseudotriakidae Gill, 1893 (false catsharks)
  - Family Proscylliidae Fowler, 1941 (finback catsharks)
  - Family Leptochariidae Gray, 1851 (barbeled houndsharks)
  - Family Triakidae Gray, 1851 (houndsharks)
    - Subfamily Triakinae Gray, 1851 (smooth-hounds)
    - Subfamily Galeorhininae Gill, 1862 (school sharks)
  - Family Hemigaleidae J.C.F. Hasse, 1878 (weasel sharks)
  - Family Carcharhinidae D. S. Jordan & Evermann, 1896 (requiem sharks)
  - Family Galeocerdonidae Poey, 1875 (tiger sharks)
  - Family Sphyrnidae Bonaparte, 1840 (hammerhead sharks)

=== Fossil genera ===
The following fossil genera of Carcharhiniformes are also known:

- Genus †Altusmirus Fuchs, Engelbrecht, Lukeneder & Kriwet, 2017
- Genus †Corysodon Saint-Seine, 1949
- Genus †Platyrhizodon Guinot, Underwood, Cappetta & Ward, 2013
- Genus †Vectiscyllium Duffin & Batchelor, 2024
- Family Carcharhinidae
  - Genus †Abdounia Cappetta, 1980
  - Genus †Archaeogaleus Guinot, Cappetta & Adnet, 2014
  - Genus †Danogaleus Noubhani & Cappetta, 1997
  - Genus †Eogaleus Cappetta, 1975
  - Genus †Eorhincodon Li, 1997
  - Genus †Fornicatus Fuchs, Engelbrecht, Lukeneder & Kriwet, 2018
  - Genus †Kruckowlamna Laurito Mora, 1999
  - Genus †Misrichthys Case & Cappetta, 1990
  - Genus †Pseudabdounia Ebersole, Cicimurri & Stringer, 2019
- Family †Florenceodontidae Cappetta, Morrison & Adnet, 2019
  - Genus †Florenceodon Cappetta, Morrison & Adnet, 2019
- Family †Leptocarchariidae Adnet et al., 2020
  - Genus †Leptocarcharias Adnet et al., 2020
- Family Hemigaleidae
  - Genus †Moerigaleus Underwood & Ward, 2011
- Family Galeocerdonidae
  - Genus †Physogaleus Cappetta, 1980
- Family †Pseudoscyliorhinidae Stumpf, Scheer & Kriwet, 2019
  - Genus †Diprosopovenator Stumpf, Scheer & Kriwet, 2019
  - Genus †Pseudoscyliorhinus Müller & Diedrich, 1991
- Family Pentanchidae
  - Genus †Pseudoapristurus Pollerspöck & Straube, 2017
- Family Proscyllidae
  - Genus †Praeproscyllium Underwood & Ward, 2004
- Family Scyliorhinidae
  - Genus †Bavariscyllium Thies, 2005
  - Genus †Cadiera Guinot, Cappetta & Adnet, 2014
  - Genus †Casieria Noubhani & Cappetta, 1997
  - Genus †Crassescyliorhinus Underwood & Ward, 2008
  - Genus †Cretascyliorhinus Underwood & Mitchell, 1999
  - Genus †Foumtizia Noubhani & Cappetta, 1997
  - Genus †Megascyliorhinus Cappetta & Ward, 1977
  - Genus †Microscyliorhinus Case, 1994
  - Genus †Orthodon Coquand, 1860
  - Genus †Pachyscyllium Reinecke, Moths, Grant & Breitkreuz, 2005
  - Genus †Palaeoscyllium Wagner, 1857
  - Genus †Platyrhizoscyllium Adnet, 2006
  - Genus †Porodermoides Noubhani & Cappetta, 1997
  - Genus †Premontreia Cappetta, 1992
  - Genus †Prohaploblepharus Underwood & Ward, 2008
  - Genus †Protoscyliorhinus Herman, 1977
  - Genus †Pteroscyllium Cappetta, 1980
  - Genus †Scyliorhinotheca Kiel, Peckmann & Simon, 2013
  - Genus †Sigmoscyllium Guinot, Underwood, Cappetta & Ward, 2013
  - Genus †Stenoscyllium Noubhani & Cappetta, 1997
  - Genus †Thiesus Guinot, Cappetta & Adnet, 2014
  - Genus †Tingaleus Cappetta, 1993
- Family Triakidae
  - Genus †Archaeotriakis Case, 1978
  - Genus †Gomphogaleus Adnet & Cappetta, 2008
  - Genus †Kallodentis Engelbrecht, Mörs, Reguero & Kriwet, 2017
  - Genus †Khouribgaleus Noubhani & Cappetta, 1997
  - Genus †Meridiogaleus Engelbrecht, Mörs, Reguero & Kriwet, 2017
  - Genus †Pachygaleus Cappetta, 1992
  - Genus †Palaeogaleus Gurr, 1962
  - Genus †Palaeotriakis Guinot, Underwood, Cappetta & Ward, 2013
  - Genus †Rhaibodus Böhm, 1926
  - Genus †Squatigaleus Cappetta, 1989
  - Genus †Xystrogaleus Adnet, 2006
