= Altusmirus =

Altusmirus Temporal range: Valanginian

Scientific classification
- Kingdom: Animalia
- Phylum: Chordata
- Class: Chondrichthyes
- Subclass: Elasmobranchii
- Division: Selachii
- Order: Carcharhiniformes
- Family: incertae sedis
- Genus: †Altusmirus; Fuchs, Engelbrecht, Lukeneder & Kriwet, 2018
- Species: †A. triquetrus

Binomial name
- †Altusmirus triquetrus Fuchs, Engelbrecht, Lukeneder & Kriwet, 2018

Extinct genus of sharks

Altusmirus is an extinct genus of ground shark from the Early Cretaceous age of Austria. There is only one known species, A. triquetrus, named by Iris Fuchs in 2018. It was related to Fornicatus.
