= Ostarriraja =

Ostarriraja Temporal range: Burdigalian

Scientific classification
- Kingdom: Animalia
- Phylum: Chordata
- Class: Chondrichthyes
- Subclass: Elasmobranchii
- Order: Rajiformes
- Genus: †Ostarriraja
- Species: †O. parva

Binomial name
- †Ostarriraja parva Marramà et al., 2019

Extinct genus of fishes

Ostarriraja is an extinct genus of rajiform chondrichthyan that lived during the Burdigalian stage of the Miocene epoch.

== Distribution ==
Ostarriraja parva is known from Austria and lived in the Central Paratethys.
