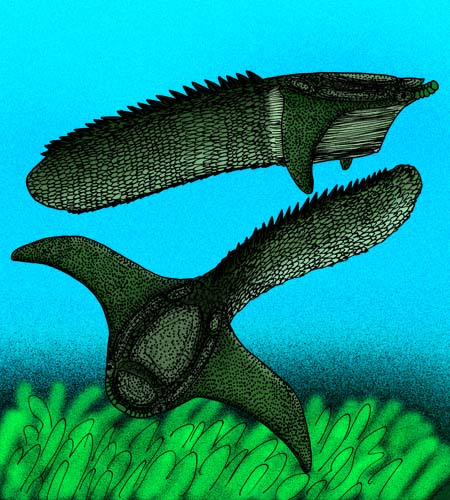
- Pycnosteus tuberculata

Scientific classification
- Kingdom: Animalia
- Phylum: Chordata
- Class: Agnatha
- Order: Heterostraci
- Suborder: Psammosteida
- Family: Pycnosteidae
- Genus: Pycnosteus Preobrazensky, 1911

Binomial name
- Pycnosteus tuberculata Preobrazensky, 1911

= Pycnosteus =

Pycnosteus Temporal range: Eifelian–Givetian

Extinct genus of jawless fishes

Pycnosteus is an extinct genus of jawless fish from the Devonian. It is thought to have cruised through vegetation, eating small invertebrates which it knocked loose.
