= Doliobatis =

Doliobatis Temporal range: 183–175.6 Ma Toarcian

Scientific classification
- Kingdom: Animalia
- Phylum: Chordata
- Class: Chondrichthyes
- Subclass: Elasmobranchii
- Order: Rhinopristiformes
- Family: Rhinobatidae
- Genus: †Doliobatis; Delsate & Candoni, 2001
- Species: †D. weisi

Binomial name
- †Doliobatis weisi Delsate & Candoni, 2001

Extinct genus of rays

Doliobatis is an extinct genus of guitarfish that lived during the Early Jurassic. It contains one valid species, D. weisi, which has been found in Luxembourg. It was originally referred to the family Archaeobatidae, but was later reassigned to the family Rhinobatidae.
