= Tuberculaspis =

Tuberculaspis Temporal range: Early Devonian Late Emsian 402.5–393.5 Ma

Scientific classification
- Kingdom: Animalia
- Phylum: Chordata
- Infraphylum: Agnatha
- Class: †Pteraspidomorpha
- Subclass: †Heterostraci
- Order: †Pteraspidiformes
- Family: †Protaspididae
- Genus: †Tuberculaspis; Ilyes & Elliot., 1994

Type species
- T. elyensis Ilyes & Elliot., 1994

Extinct genus of jawless fishes

Tuberculaspis is an extinct genus of pteraspidiform agnathan from the Late Emsian of Nevada. The fish is known from a number of specimens, all collected from a single locality of the Sevy Dolomite. Though originally placed in Pteraspididae, later phylogenic studies of the class instead suggest that Tuberculaspis is a member of the family Protaspididae. Like the name suggests, the dorsal shield of the fish is heavily ornamented, with this varying wildly throughout the shield. Though the paleoenvironment of the Sevy Dolomite has been argued, current interpretations suggest that it was a nearshore marine ecosystem with fluctuating salinities. Only one species is assigned to the genus: T. elyensis.

== History and naming ==
The material assigned to Tuberculaspis was collected from the Late Emsian Sevy Dolomite at a locality near Ely, Nevada. This material is made up of the holotype ( FMNH-PF 1411) along with the nine paratypes, four ventral discs, and eleven body scales. All of these specimens being housed at the Field Museum of Natural History in Chicago, Illinois. The specimens were described in a paper by Robert R. Ilyes and David K. Elliott in 1994, with this paper acting as a formal description of the pteraspidid material from two diverse localities originally found by J.D. Longshore.

The generic name Tuberculaspis translates to "tubercule shield", being a combination of the Latin tuberculum and the Greek aspis. This being in reference to the ornamentation of the fish. The specific name elyensis is in reference to the region where the material was found.

== Description ==
Like a majority of heterostracans, Tuberculaspis is a small fish with it having a headshield ranging in lengths of 68–71 millimetres (2.7–2.8 in) and widths of 53–60 millimetres (2.1–2.4 in).

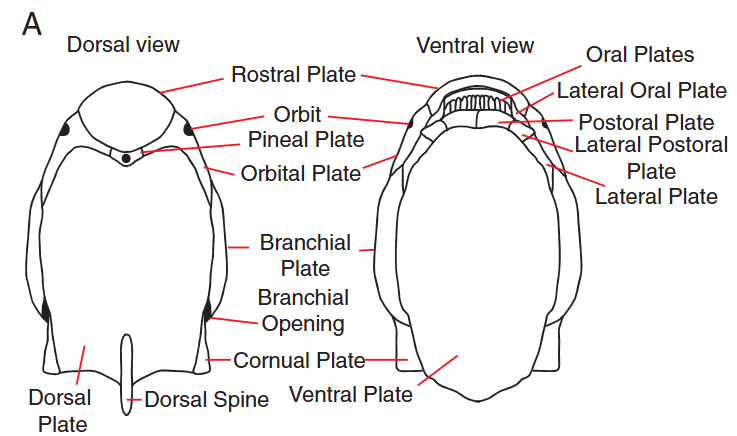
A labeled anatomical diagram of a hypothetical pteraspidiform

At the front of the headshield of Tuberculaspis, like in other Pteraspidiformes, is a rostral plate though it is much shorter than in Pteraspis. Along with this, the plate is much broader and is almost semicircular in shape. Behind the rostral are the orbital and the pineal plates. The large pineal plate is almost rectangular, though both the anterior and posterior edges are convexly rounded with the posterior edge being more so. This plate is positioned between the two orbital plates though the exact amount of contact differs largely between individuals, with some individuals having no contact between these plates. Behind the small orbit, the postorbital process stretches posteriorly and tapers down the length of the process. Like the rostral plate, the dorsal plate is similarly stout though has a convex arch at the back with the lateral edges becoming concave right before this arch. In contrast to this, the anterior edge of the plate is relatively straight. At the posterior section of the dorsal plate, there is a triangular dorsal spine which extends slightly past the dorsal plate. Unlike most other Pteraspidiformes, Tuberculaspis lacks cornual plates. The branchial plate is only slightly shorter than the dorsal plate though is a bit wider. This width increases down the length of the plate only to abruptly stop at the posteriorly-facing branchial opening. A pair of elongated accessory post-branchial plates are located under each of these openings. Along the suture line of the dorsal plate where it is in contact with the orbital and brachial plates, there is a collection of small, roughly-ovular plates that are only loosely attached the other plates. Due to this, it is unknown if they were discontinuous like what is seen in the specimens or if they formed one continuous line that would have completely covered the suture. Based on what is known, these plates increase in size behind the postorbital process. At the bottom of the headshield is the ventral shield which is generally wide though thins out and increased in height at the front of the plate. Around twelve notches are located on the anterior edge with the largest ones being located towards the center of the plate. Though not preserved in specimens, oral plates would have been inserted into these notches. Along with this, there are groves on the plate which radiate outwards from the posterior edge. The only postcranial material of Tuberculaspis is a few isolated scales belonging to the flack and ridge of the body, they are generally similar to what is seen in Pteraspididae.

The sensory canal system of Tuberculaspis is largely on the dorsal plate of the fish. A pair of median dorsal sensory canals run along with length of the dorsal plate with them meeting the interorbital canal within the pineal plate. The lateral dorsal canals run parallel to the median dorsal sensory canals, though are positioned much less medially. A total of three pairs of lateral commissures start at the lateral dorsal canals and are directed towards the growth center of the dorsal plate. A pair of supra-orbital canals are located on the rostral plate and end when they make contact with the interorbital canal.

As the name suggests, the headshield of Tuberculaspis is heavily ornamented. At the growth center of the dorsal plate, this ornamentation is made up of small ridges though this is replaced by to small dentine tubercules further from the center and on other plates. These tubercules are positioned parallel to the edges of the plate margins though they are less consistent near the oral cavity. The shape of them is also inconsistent with some being more ovular while others are more rectangular. They are usually domed and are slightly bent, meaning that the highest point of the denticle is usually off center. The plates along the sutures of the dorsal plate differ slightly from the rest of Tuberculaspis, instead being a mix of the tubercules and ridges.

== Classification ==
In the initial description of the genus, Tuberculaspis was placed as a member of Pteraspididae with it being referred to as a "typical pteraspidid" in the 1994 publication by Iyles and Elliott. The phylogeny included with the paper placed the genus as sister to another genus described in the same paper, Pirumaspis. The cladogram from this paper can be found below:

- - - Protopteraspis
    - - Lamiaspis
      - - Lampraspis
        - - Oreaspis
          - - - Cosmaspis
              - Cyrtaspidichthys
            - - Protaspis
              - - Eucyclaspis
                - - - Tuberculaspis
                    - Pirumaspis
                  - - Psephaspis

This assignment to Pteraspididae was countered in another paper by David K. Elliott along with Vincent N. Pernègre in 2008 which focused on analyzing the phylogenic relationships within Pteraspidiformes. This analysis instead placed Tuberculaspis as a member of another family, Protaspididae, where it placed close to Europrotaspis. The genus was also included in another larger phylogeny in a 2017 publication by Emma Randle and Robert S. Sansom focused on looking at the relationships within Pteraspidiformes found a similar result as the 2008 publication. The phylogenies from the mentioned publications can be found below:

Pernègre & Elliott. (2008)

- - - Anglaspis heintz
    - - Nahanniaspis mackenziei
      - - Pteraspidiformes
          - - Anchipteraspididae
              - Anchipteraspis crenulata
              - Rachiaspis pteriga
            - - Stegobranchiaspis baringensis
              - - Doryaspis arctica
                - - Doryaspis groenhorgenis
                  - Doryaspis nathorsti
              - - Unarkaspis schultzei
                - - Panamintaspis snowi
                  - - Pteraspididae
                      - Pteraspidoidei
                        - - Canadapteraspis alocostomata
                          - Larnovaspis goujeti
                        - - Loricopteraspis dairydinglensis
                          - - Errivaspis waynensis
                            - Rhinopteraspis crouchi
                      - - Gigantaspididae
                          - Gigantaspis minima
                          - - Gigantaspis minima
                            - Gigantaspis isachseni
                        - Protaspididae
                          - Xylaspis prima
                          - - Tuberculaspis elyensis
                            - Europrotaspis crenulata
                            - - Protaspis bucheri
                              - Cosmaspis transversa
                              - Zascinaspis carmani

Randle & Sansom (2017)

- - - Athenaegis
    - - - Anglaspis
        - Nahanniaspis
      - - - Anchipteraspis
          - - Rachiaspis
            - Ulutitaspis
        - - Protopteraspis primaeva
          - - Protopteraspis gosseleti
            - - - Canadapteraspis
                - Miltaspis
              - - Loricopteraspis
                - - Stegobranchiaspis
                  - - - Gigantaspis
                      - Zascinaspis heintzi
                    - - - - - - Alaeckaspis
                              - Dnestraspis
                            - - - - Brachipteraspis
                                  - Errivaspis
                                - - Pavloaspis
                                  - - Althaspis
                                    - Rhinopteraspis
                              - - Larnovaspis
                                - - - Mylopteraspidella
                                    - - Parapteraspis
                                      - Podolaspis
                                  - - Unarkaspis
                                    - - - Lamiaspis
                                        - Pirumaspis
                                      - - Djurinaspis
                                        - - Oreaspis
                                          - Semipodolaspis
                        - - Pteraspis
                          - - Escharaspis
                            - - Xylaspis
                              - - Doryaspis
                                - Woodfjordaspis
                              - - Drepanaspis
                                - Psammosteus
                      - - Drepanaspis
                        - - - Blieckaspis
                            - Panamintaspis
                          - - - Lampraspis
                              - Zascinaspis carmani
                            - - - Eucyclaspis
                                - Europrotaspis
                              - - Protaspis
                                - - Cyrtaspidichthys
                                  - - Tuberculaspis
                                    - - Cosmaspis
                                      - - Helaspis
                                        - - Psephaspis

== Paleoenvironment ==
The paleoenvironment of the Sevy Dolostone has in the past been argued to represent both marine and freshwater faunas though the presence of lingulids suggests a more marine environment. Due to the presence of these brachiopods and a lack of other invertebrates, it is suspected that the salinity in the body of water fluctuated. In all of these interpretations, the fauna is thought to have been living near the shore. Other than Tuberculaspis , the dolomite has been where a number of other fish have been found including osteostracans, acanthodians, and placoderms.
