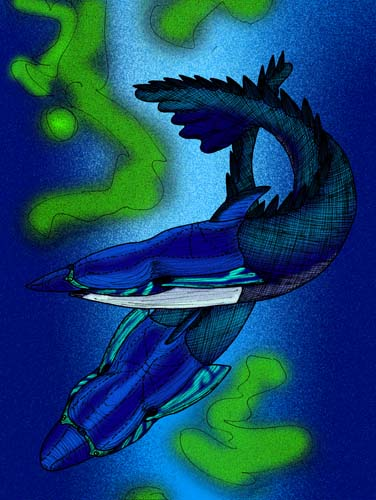
- Life restoration of P. snowi

Scientific classification
- Kingdom: Animalia
- Phylum: Chordata
- Infraphylum: Agnatha
- Class: †Pteraspidomorpha
- Subclass: †Heterostraci
- Order: †Pteraspidiformes
- Suborder: †Pteraspidoidei
- Genus: †Panamintaspis; Elliot & Ilyes, 1996

Type species
- P. snowi Elliot & Ilyes, 1996

= Panamintaspis =

Panamintaspis Temporal range: Midle Devonian late Emsian ~402.045–393.47 Ma

Extinct genus of jawless fishes

Panamintaspis is an extinct genus of pteraspidoid heterostracan from the late Early Devonian of California. Fossil of the genus are only known from the lower member of the Lost Burro Formation. Like a number of other genera, the genus was originally placed in Pteraspididae though later studies disagreed with this assignment. The most recent paper on the systematics of the group instead place it as incertae sedis within Pteraspidoidei and the sister genus to Blieckaspis. Panamintaspis was found in a shallow, brackish environment like a large amount of other coeval fish from the Western United States. There is only one species within the genus: P. snowi.

== History and Naming ==
The material assigned to Panamintaspis was collected from the basal portion of the late Emsian Lippincott Member of the Lost Burro Formation in Death Valley National Monument, California. The genus was described by David Elliott and Robert Ilyes in 1996 based on the holotype (FMNH-PF 14146) and a total of 30 other specimens. Since the original description of the genus by Elliott and Ilyes, two papers focusing on the hydrodynamics of jawless fish headshields that include Panamintaspis have been published.

The genus name for Panamintaspis derives from the locality it was found which is within the Panamint Range and the Greek word "aspis" which translates to shield. The specific name "snowi" refers to J. C. Snow, the first person to show that vertebrate material was found within the Lippincott Member.

== Description ==
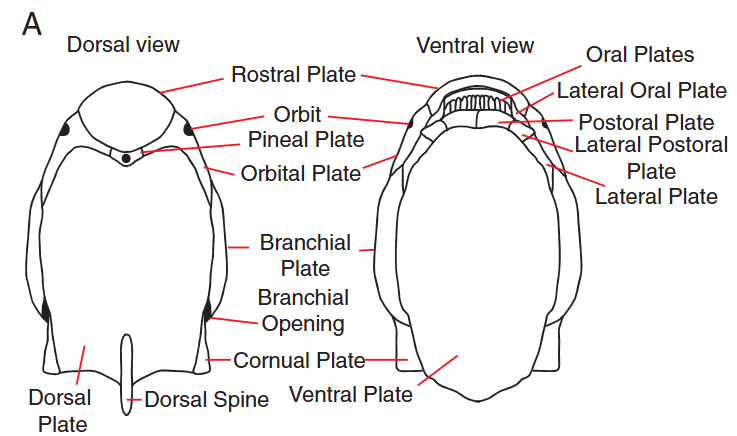
A labeled anatomical diagram of a hypothetical pteraspidiform

Unlike a majority of other related genera from the Western United States, the headshield of Panamintaspis is long and high-arched towards the back. Even though it is noted to be large from the group, it was still a small fish with a headshield length of only 190 millimetres (7.5 in) and width of 105 millimetres (4.1 in).

At the front of the headshield of Panamintaspis is an elongate rostral plate that comes to a point at the anterior end. Similar to the rest of the shield, it is arched. Behind the rostral is a much smaller, rounded plate holding the pineal organ. This plate is positioned between the paired orbital plate which are long plates that possess a short projection that slightly overlaps the rostral plate. Behind the small orbits, the orbital plate tapers off and run along the frontmost lateral edge of the dorsal plate. The branchial plate is located behind the orbital and makes up the anterior edge of the branchial opening which is located at about the midpoint of the headshield. It is triangular in cross section and in basic shape, starting as a tip but becoming wider posteriorly. The large cornual plate forms the posterior and lateral edges of the opening. Similar to the branchial plate, the cornual plate also starts as a tip though it also thins back out towards the back end. While being largely convex, the plate becomes concave posteriorly. The branchial opening itself is large and ovular. Along with the mentioned plates, the dorsal plate makes up the medial edge of the opening. The dorsal plate is a very large plate that that begins fairly arched but becomes most extreme towards the back. The plate is split length-wise by a groove that runs anteriorly from the growth center of the dorsal spine. The dorsal spine is an elongate, similar to the rest of the headshield, and triangular portion of the shield that slopes at a low angle. A number of dentine ridges run longitudinally along the length of the spine. The ventral plate is not fully known but the anterior portion of the plate is slightly arched. A number of ridge and flank scales not found with the shields were also found and they are similar to what is seen in other closely related general. The ridge scales are elongate scales that have a length of 12–20 millimetres (0.47–0.79 in) and have bands made up of round-crested ridges. The flack scales are much smaller being 6–8 millimetres (0.24–0.31 in) long and are subtringular. The dentine ridges on these scales are flat-crested and organized in longitudinal bands.

The dorsal sensatory system of Panamintaspis is similar to what is seen in close relatives, with the longest canal being the paired median dorsal canal that runs along the length of the dorsal plate. Lateral to this canal is the lateral dorsal canal. These two canals are connected by three paired transverse commissures that are located further back than what is seen in relatives. The supra-orbital canal runs along the length of the rostral plate until it meets the inter-orbital canal. This canal and the median dorsal canal meet within the pineal plate.

The ornamentation on the dorsal and rostral plates are continuous with one another. At the medial portion of both of the plates, it is made up of flat-topped ridges with faint serrations along their margins. On the more lateral portions of these plates along with the cornual plate, the crests range from pointed to rounded and are notched.

=== Hydrodynamics ===
In a 2024 paper by Héctor Botella and coauthors, the evolution of more streamlined Pteraspidiformes was shown through looked at the flow structures that surround the headshields of Panamintaspis and the more basal Doryaspis. This study showed that the fish would have been capable of swimming in more pelagic areas along with being able to both coast and swim in bursts. A similar result of streamlining was seen in a 2025 publication by Vicente Sanchez-Sanchez and coauthors, a functional analysis of the headshield processes (rostral plate, cornual plate, and dorsal spine) was done to determine what effect they had hydrodynamics of the fish. In the publication, they described the genus and a few others as a group processing backwards-curving dorsal processes, pointed snouts, and more traditional later processes. It was shown that the elongate snout of these fish would have made the shield more streamlined and reduced drag.

== Classification ==
In the original publication by Elliot and Ilyes, Panamintaspis was placed as a member of Pteraspididae. Similar to a number of other genera, this was fairly quickly changed with this taking place in a publication by Elliott and Vincent N. Pernègre in 2008 which focused on analyzing the phylogenic relationships within Pteraspidiformes. This paper instead suggested that the genus was a part of a paraphyletic group called 'Protopteraspididae'. In their results, the family was treated as genera between Anchipteraspididae and Pteraspididae. A 2017 publication by Emma Randle and Robert S. Sansom focusing on both Pteraspidiformes and Cyathaspididae instead showed the genus either in a clade contained taxa such as Blieckaspis and Lamiaspis or closer to Lampraspis. A second 2017 paper by the authors that only focused Pteraspidiformes did not recognize 'Protopteraspididae' and instead placed Panamintaspis as sister to Blieckaspis. What these two genera are most closely related to depends on the type of character analysis with the authors not thinking one is more likely to be accurate over another. The discretized analysis shows a close relationship with taxa only from the Western United States while the discrete and continuous character analysis shows a closer relation between taxa from the Western United States and Podolia. They do note that the former analysis does come out more parsimonious. Due to the results of the paper, they placed the genus as incertae sedis within Pteraspidoidei. Below is a phylogenic tree from both the 2008 publication by Elliott and Pernègre and the 2017 pteraspidiform-focused publication by Randle and Sansom:

Pernègre & Elliott. (2008)

- - - Anglaspis heintz
    - - Nahanniaspis mackenziei
      - - Pteraspidiformes
          - - Anchipteraspididae
              - Anchipteraspis crenulata
              - Rachiaspis pteriga
            - - Stegobranchiaspis baringensis
              - - Doryaspis arctica
                - - Doryaspis groenhorgenis
                  - Doryaspis nathorsti
              - - Unarkaspis schultzei
                - - Panamintaspis snowi
                  - - Pteraspididae
                      - Pteraspidoidei
                        - - Canadapteraspis alocostomata
                          - Larnovaspis goujeti
                        - - Loricopteraspis dairydinglensis
                          - - Errivaspis waynensis
                            - Rhinopteraspis crouchi
                      - - Gigantaspididae
                          - Gigantaspis minima
                          - - Gigantaspis minima
                            - Gigantaspis isachseni
                        - Protaspididae
                          - Xylaspis prima
                          - - Tuberculaspis elyensis
                            - Europrotaspis crenulata
                            - - Protaspis bucheri
                              - Cosmaspis transversa
                              - Zascinaspis carmani

Randle & Sansom (2017)

- - - Athenaegis
    - - - Anglaspis
        - Nahanniaspis
      - - - Anchipteraspis
          - - Rachiaspis
            - Ulutitaspis
        - - Protopteraspis primaeva
          - - Protopteraspis gosseleti
            - - - Canadapteraspis
                - Miltaspis
              - - Loricopteraspis
                - - Stegobranchiaspis
                  - - - Gigantaspis
                      - Zascinaspis heintzi
                    - - - - - - Alaeckaspis
                              - Dnestraspis
                            - - - - Brachipteraspis
                                  - Errivaspis
                                - - Pavloaspis
                                  - - Althaspis
                                    - Rhinopteraspis
                              - - Larnovaspis
                                - - - Mylopteraspidella
                                    - - Parapteraspis
                                      - Podolaspis
                                  - - Unarkaspis
                                    - - - Lamiaspis
                                        - Pirumaspis
                                      - - Djurinaspis
                                        - - Oreaspis
                                          - Semipodolaspis
                        - - Pteraspis
                          - - Escharaspis
                            - - Xylaspis
                              - - Doryaspis
                                - Woodfjordaspis
                              - - Drepanaspis
                                - Psammosteus
                      - - Drepanaspis
                        - - - Blieckaspis
                            - Panamintaspis
                          - - - Lampraspis
                              - Zascinaspis carmani
                            - - - Eucyclaspis
                                - Europrotaspis
                              - - Protaspis
                                - - Cyrtaspidichthys
                                  - - Tuberculaspis
                                    - - Cosmaspis
                                      - - Helaspis
                                        - - Psephaspis

== Paleoenvironment ==
Lippincott Member of the Lost Burro Formation is represented by what is most likely a channel fill deposits that were deposited within a low salinity but most likely still brackish environment. This estuarine environment then became marine after the deposition of the fauna due to a marine transgression. The groups that make up the fauna of the Lippincott Member is similar to what is seen in other coeval deposits such as the Beartooth Butte Formation and Sevy Dolostone. These include acanthodians, poraspids, thelodonts, and an osteostracan. The sister genus of Panamintaspis, Blieckaspis, is also known from the deposits.
