= Hidden Valley Dolomite =

Geologic formation in the northern Mojave Desert of California

- Stratigraphic range: Silurian—Devonian
- Type: Geologic formation
- Underlies: Lost Burro Formation
- Overlies: Ely Springs Dolomite
- Thickness: 1,000–1,300 feet (300–400 m)

Lithology
- Primary: Dolomite

Location
- Region: Mojave Desert; California
- Country: United States

Type section
- Named for: Hidden Valley
- Named by: McAllister (1952)

The Hidden Valley Dolomite is a Silurian−Devonian geologic formation in the northern Mojave Desert of California, in the western United States.

Locations where it is exposed include sections of the southern Inyo Mountains and the Talc City Hills.

Hidden Valley Dolomite overlies the Ely Springs Dolomite formation and underlies the Lost Burro Formation.

== Paleontology ==
Outcrops of the Hidden Valley Dolomite formation's Lippincott Member in Death Valley National Park have produced fossils of the fishes. Panamintaspis snowi and Blieckaspis priscillae along with the remains of other jawless fishes and a small arthrodire placoderm.

== See also ==
- Geology of Inyo County, California
