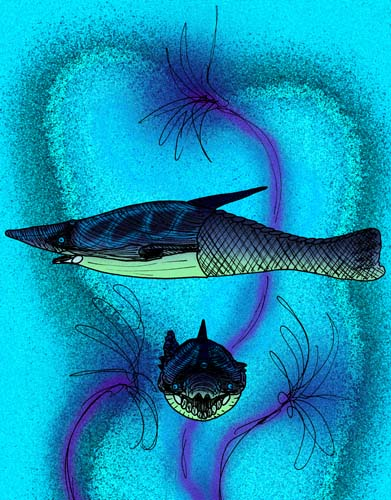
- Errivaspis

Scientific classification
- Domain: Eukaryota
- Kingdom: Animalia
- Phylum: Chordata
- Infraphylum: Agnatha
- Class: †Pteraspidomorpha
- Subclass: †Heterostraci
- Order: †Pteraspidiformes
- Suborder: †Pteraspidoidei sensu Pernègre, 2006

Families
- †Pteraspididae; †Gigantaspididae; †Protaspididae; incertae sedis - Genus: †Palanasaspis

Synonyms
- †Pteraspidina sensu Janvier, 1996

= Pteraspidoidei =

Pteraspidoidei Temporal range: Devonian

Extinct suborder of jawless fishes

Pteraspidoidei is an extinct suborder of heterostracan vertebrates. It contains the more derived taxa within Pteraspidiformes, such as Pteraspis and Errivaspis, though, some protopteraspidids, such as Doryaspis and Panamintaspis, share various features with these derived pteraspidids.
