= Protaspididae =

Protaspididae Temporal range: Early Devonian
- Fossil of Cosmaspis transversa in the Field Museum of Natural History, Chicago

Scientific classification
- Kingdom: Animalia
- Phylum: Chordata
- Infraphylum: Agnatha
- Class: †Pteraspidomorpha
- Subclass: †Heterostraci
- Order: †Pteraspidiformes
- Suborder: †Pteraspidoidei
- Family: †Protaspididae

Genera
- Protaspis; Cosmaspis; Lampraspis; Europrotaspis; Cyrtaspidichthys; Oreaspis; Psephaspis; Rodenaspis; Tuberculaspis; Xylaspis; Zascinaspis; Woodfjordaspis; Pirumaspis

Extinct family of jawless fishes

Protaspididae is an extinct family of pteraspidid heterostracan agnathans. Fossils of the various genera are found in early Devonian-aged marine strata. Protaspidids were once thought to represent a transitional form between the Pteraspididae and the Psammosteida, bearing the broad head shield shape of the latter, due to a more benthic (bottom-dwelling) existence, but recent phylogenical comparisons demonstrate that the protaspidids are actually highly derived pteraspidids, and that the anchipteraspidids, the most primitive of pteraspidids, are the sister-group of the psammosteids.

== Genera ==
Many genera are found in Lower Devonian marine deposits of the United States, especially of Utah and Wyoming. Others are found in Lower Devonian marine strata of Europe, especially of Svalbard, Norway, and Podolia, Ukraine.

=== Protaspis ===
This genus is known from several species from the Early Devonian-aged Beartooth Butte Formation strata of Wyoming and Utah. Europrotaspis, Cosmaspis, Lampraspis, Gigantaspis, Eucyclaspis, and Cyrtaspidithchys have been formerly placed within Protaspis as subgenera, or otherwise have been treated as species therein.

=== Europrotaspis ===
Species of this genus are very similar to those of Protaspis, but, are found in Early Devonian-aged strata of Western Europe and Podolia, Ukraine.

=== Eucyclaspis ===
Species of Eucyclaspis are found in marine strata of the Water Canyon Formation, in Lower Devonian Utah. This genus differs from Protaspis by having unique processes emanating behind the eye on the orbital plate.

=== Cosmaspis ===
Cosmaspis is restricted to marine environments of Early Devonian Wyoming and possibly Utah, where it coexisted with species of Protaspis, Lampraspis, Eucyclaspis, Oreaspis and Cyrtaspidichthys.

=== Lampraspis ===
Lampraspis is known from Early Devonian-aged marine environments of Utah and Wyoming. It is closely related to Oreaspis and Psephaspis, and the three genera were, at one time, placed together in a subfamily, "Oreaspidinae."

=== Cyrtaspidichthys ===
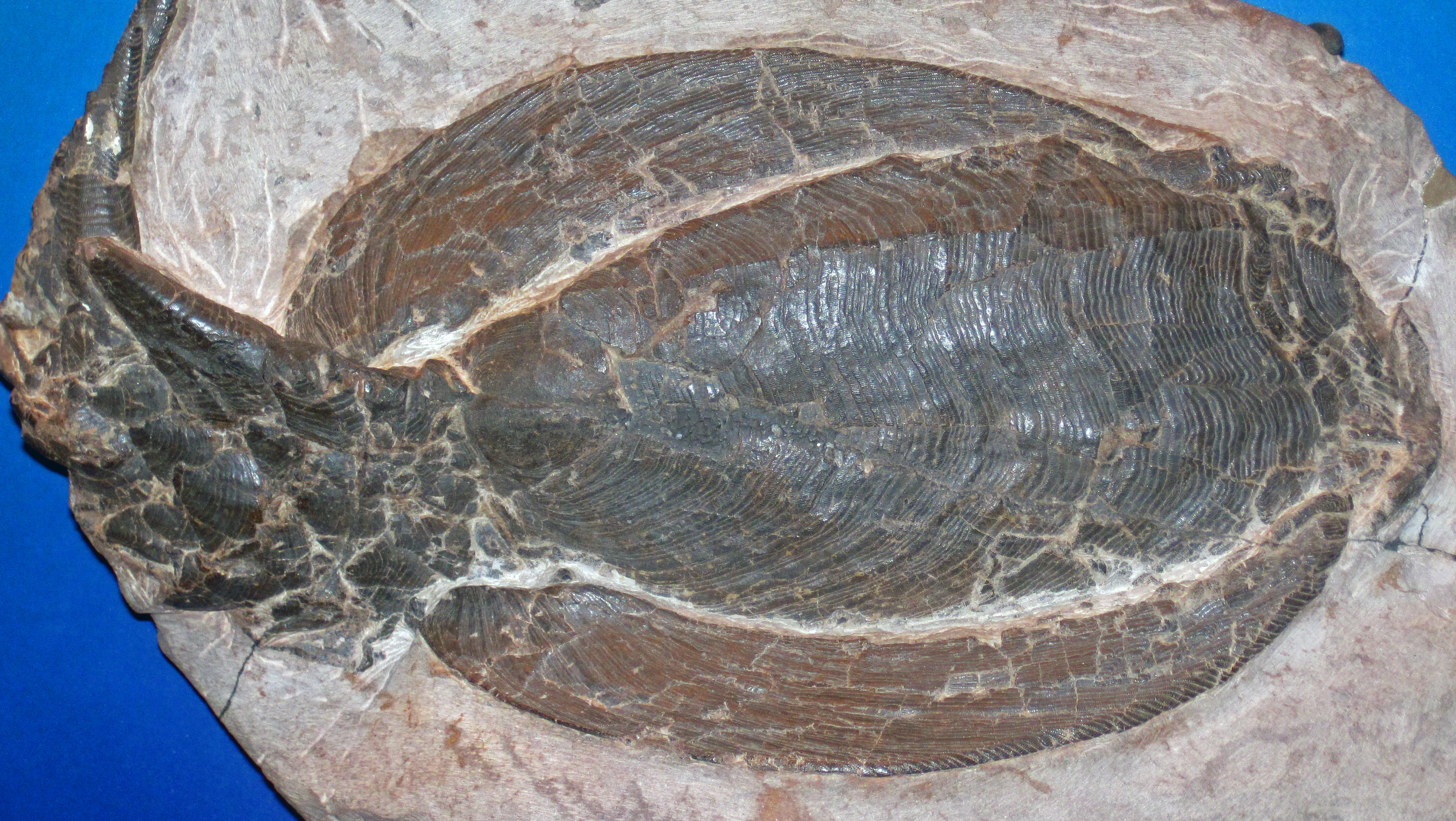
Cosmaspis transversa

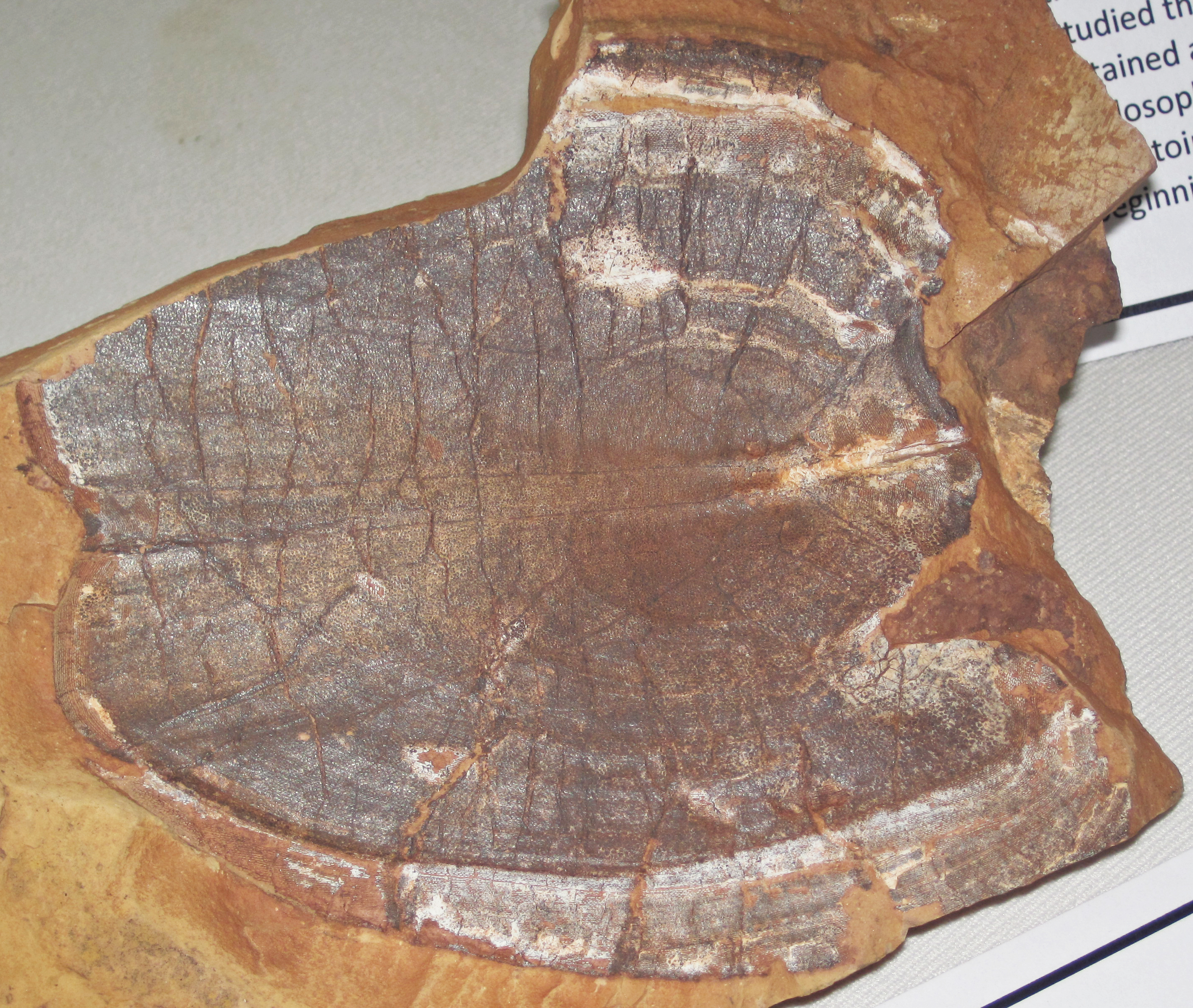
Cyrtaspidichthys sculptus

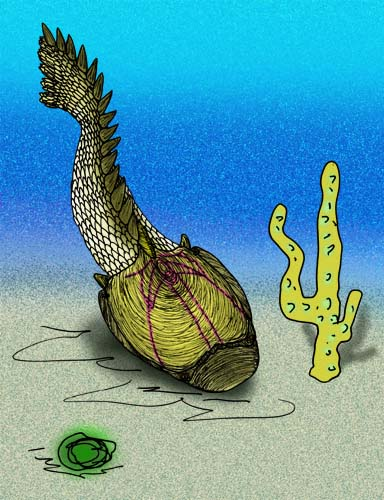
Oreaspis dunkle

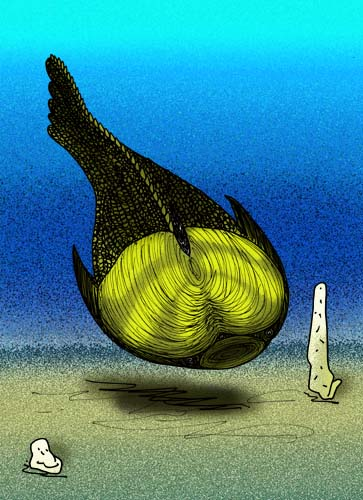
Psephaspis williamsi

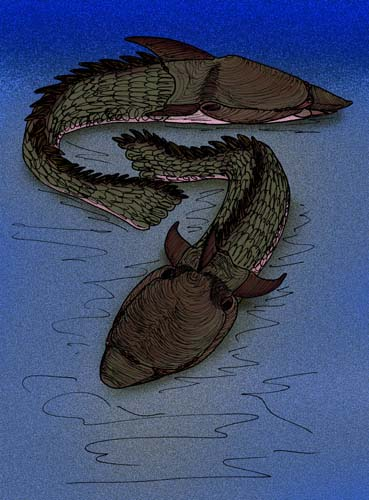
Pirumaspis lancasteri

Species of Cyrtaspidichthys, originally "Cyrtaspis," are very similar to those of Protaspis. Fossils of Cyrtaspidichthys are found in Early Devonian-aged marine strata of Beartooth Butte, Wyoming.

=== Oreaspis ===
Oreaspis differs from Protaspis in ornamentation, and that the postbranchial plate (the plate posterior to the exhalant opening of the animal's gills) forms a tiny, wing-like process. Species of Oreaspis are found in Early Devonian marine strata of Water Canyon, Utah, and Beartooth Butte of Wyoming. At one time, this genus, together with Lampraspis and Psephaspis, was placed within its own subfamily, "Oreaspidinae."

=== Psephaspis ===
Species of Psephaspis, which are restricted to Idaho and Utah, have broad, flat, rounded and heart-shaped dorsal shields, and ornamentation similar to those of psammosteids. Because of these two traits, species of this genus were originally described as being North American psammosteids closely related to Drepanaspis by Orvig. Denison then redescribed them as being pteraspidids closely related to Protaspis, noting that the overall anatomy is that of a typical pteraspidid. Denison also notes that Psephaspis is the youngest genus of pteraspidid, as specimens of P. idahoensis are found in Middle Devonian-aged strata of Lemhi County, Idaho, which are younger than the latest strata other pteraspidids are found in.

=== Rodenaspis ===
This genus was established by Blieck in 1984 when he elevated Protaspis (Protaspis) brevispina into a separate genus, noting its cornual processes are distinct from Protaspis.

=== Tuberculaspis ===
Tuberculaspis is known from Early Devonian marine strata of Nevada, where it coexisted sympatrically with the protopteraspidid Lamiaspis, and fellow protaspid Pirumaspis in a shallow-water marine environment. It is named for tubercule-like growths that decorate the borders of its dorsal shield.

=== Xylaspis ===
This Spitzbergen protaspid was originally named Spitsbergaspis, but that name was discovered to be preoccupied by an Ordovician trilobite. It is similar in form and related to Zascinaspis and Woodfjordaspis.

=== Zascinaspis ===
Species of Zascinaspis are found in Early Devonian marine strata of Spitzbergen, and are similar in form to Xylaspis, Woodfjordaspis and Gigantaspis, the former two genera being closely related.

=== Woodfjordaspis ===
Woodfjordaspis is known from an incomplete, partially articulated armor found in early Devonian-aged marine strata of Spitzbergen. It is similar in form and is closely related to Zascinaspis and Xylaspis.

=== Pirumaspis ===
This protaspid is from the Sevy Dolomite Fauna of Late Emsian-aged marine strata in Nevada, where it coexisted sympatrically with Tuberculaspis, and the protopteraspidid Lamiaspis.
