= Palanasaspis =

Palanasaspis chekhivensis Temporal range: Pragian

Scientific classification
- Kingdom: Animalia
- Phylum: Chordata
- Infraphylum: Agnatha
- Class: †Pteraspidomorpha
- Subclass: †Heterostraci
- Order: †Pteraspidiformes
- Suborder: †Pteraspidoidei
- Genus: †Palanasaspis; Voichyshyn, 2011
- Species: †P. chekhivensis

Binomial name
- †Palanasaspis chekhivensis Voichyshyn, 2011

Genus of fishes (fossil)

Palanasaspis chekhivensis is an extinct species of pteraspidid heterostracan agnathan which existed during the Pragian epoch of the early Devonian period in what is now Podolia, Ukraine. It is known primarily from a wide rostral plate, which is referenced in the generic name, a compound word combining the Latin words pala, "shovel," and nasus, "nose," with the Greek suffix aspis, "a small shield." Although the rostral plate clearly marks the creature as a pteraspidoid heterostracan, that literally nothing else of its anatomy is known forces researchers to leave it as incertae sedis.
