= Lost Burro Formation =

Geologic formation in the Mojave Desert of California

- Stratigraphic range: Middle to Upper Devonian
- Type: Geologic formation
- Underlies: Tin Mountain Limestone
- Overlies: Hidden Valley Dolomite

Lithology
- Primary: Dolomite

Location
- Coordinates: 36.3443°N 116.5113°W
- Region: Mojave Desert; California
- Country: United States

Type section
- Named for: Lost Burro Gap
- Named by: McAllister (1952)

The Lost Burro Formation is a Middle to Upper/Late Devonian geologic formation in the Mojave Desert of California in the Western United States.

== Geology ==
The Dolomite formation is exposed in sections of the Darwin Hills, the Santa Rosa Hills, the Talc City Hills, the Inyo Mountains near the Cerro Gordo Mines, the Panamint Range near Towne Pass, and the Argus Range.

=== Fossils ===
Outcrops of the formation in Death Valley National Park have produced fossils of the placoderm Dunkleosteus terrelli, a small cladodont shark, the crushing tooth of a cochliodont, and the pteraspidid Blieckaspis priscillae.
