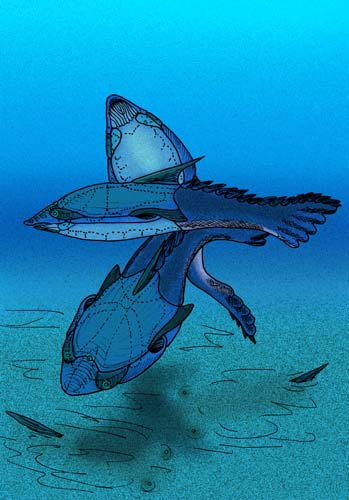
- Protopteraspis gosseleti

Scientific classification
- Kingdom: Animalia
- Phylum: Chordata
- Infraphylum: Agnatha
- Class: †Pteraspidomorpha
- Subclass: †Heterostraci
- Order: †Pteraspidiformes
- Family: †Protopteraspididae

Genera
- Protopteraspis; Doryaspis; Escharaspis; Miltaspis; Stegobranchiaspis; Unkaraspis; "Trygonaspis"

= Protopteraspididae =

Protopteraspididae Temporal range: Early Devonian

Extinct family of jawless fishes

Protopteraspididae is an extinct family of pteraspidid heterostracan agnathans. Fossils of the various genera are found in early Devonian-aged marine strata. Protopteraspidids were once thought to represent a taxon of basal pteraspidids (hence "proto") but recent evaluations demonstrate that Protopteraspididae is a paraphyletic group of various transitional forms representing a gradual transition between the more advanced Pteraspoidei (comprising Pteraspididae, Gigantaspis and Protaspididae), and the anchipteraspidids and the Psammosteids.

== Genera ==
Protopteraspids are found in Lower Devonian marine strata of the Western United States, Northern Canada, England, France, Belgium, Svalbard, Norway, and Podolia, Ukraine.

=== Protopteraspis ===
This genus is known from several species from Lower Devonian England, France and Belgium

=== Doryaspis ===
This is a genus of aberrant pteraspidids with lower lips elongated into long, dagger-like organs of unknown function. The various species are primarily restricted to the Lower Devonian strata of Svalbard.

=== "Trygonaspis" ===
"Trygonaspis" is a nomen nudum given to a well-preserved complete armor that strongly resembles Protopteraspis in form, but with a long, recurved dorsal spine, and orbital plates that have bookshelf-like extensions. The only known specimen was found in Northern Canada.
