= Mitraspis =

Mitraspis Temporal range: Lochkovian

Scientific classification
- Kingdom: Animalia
- Phylum: Chordata
- Infraphylum: Agnatha
- Class: †Pteraspidomorpha
- Subclass: †Heterostraci
- Order: †Pteraspidiformes
- Family: †Pteraspididae
- Genus: †Mitraspis
- Species: †M. cracens

Binomial name
- †Mitraspis cracens Elliott et al., 2015

Mitraspis is an extinct genus of pteraspidid that lived during the Lochkovian stage of the Early Devonian epoch.

== Distribution ==
Mitraspis cracens is known from the Drake Bay Formation of Prince of Wales Island in Nunavut, Canada.
