= Semipodolaspis =

Semipodolaspis Temporal range: Early Devonian

Scientific classification
- Kingdom: Animalia
- Phylum: Chordata
- Class: †Pteraspidomorphi
- Order: †Pteraspidiformes
- Suborder: †Pteraspidoidei
- Family: †Podolaspididae
- Genus: †Semipodolaspis Voichyshyn, 2011
- Species: †S. slobodensis

Binomial name
- †Semipodolaspis slobodensis Voichyshyn, 2011

Extinct genus of jawless fishes

Semipodolaspis is an extinct genus of jawless fish.

It is known from fossils in the Tyver formation in Podolia, Ukraine, dated to the Early Devonian.
