= Santa Rosa Hills (Inyo County) =

Mountain range in Inyo County, California, U.S.

- Location within California Location within the United States

Highest point
- Elevation: 1,746 m (5,728 ft)

Geography
- Country: United States
- State: California
- District: Inyo County
- Range coordinates: 36°27′6.776″N 117°38′25.255″W
- Topo map: USGS Santa Rosa Flat

The Santa Rosa Hills are a mountain range in the Saline Valley the northern Mojave Desert, in Inyo County, California.

They are between the Inyo Mountains and the Nelson Range, west of Death Valley and in Death Valley National Park.

== See also ==
- Lost Burro Formation
