= Talc City Hills =

- Location within California Location within the United States

Highest point
- Elevation: 1,846 m (6,056 ft)

Geography
- Country: United States
- State: California
- District: Inyo County
- Range coordinates: 36°22′8.779″N 117°42′49.264″W
- Topo map: USGS Talc City Hills

The Talc City Hills is a mountain range in the northern Mojave Desert, in Inyo County, California.

They are just north of California State Route 190 west of Panamint Springs and east of Owens Lake, southeast of the Inyo Mountains, and north of the Coso Range.

In April 2026 the EPA declared emergency conditions in the area due to air pollution, asking everyone to stay indoors.

== See also ==
- Hidden Valley Dolomite Formation
- Lost Burro Formation
