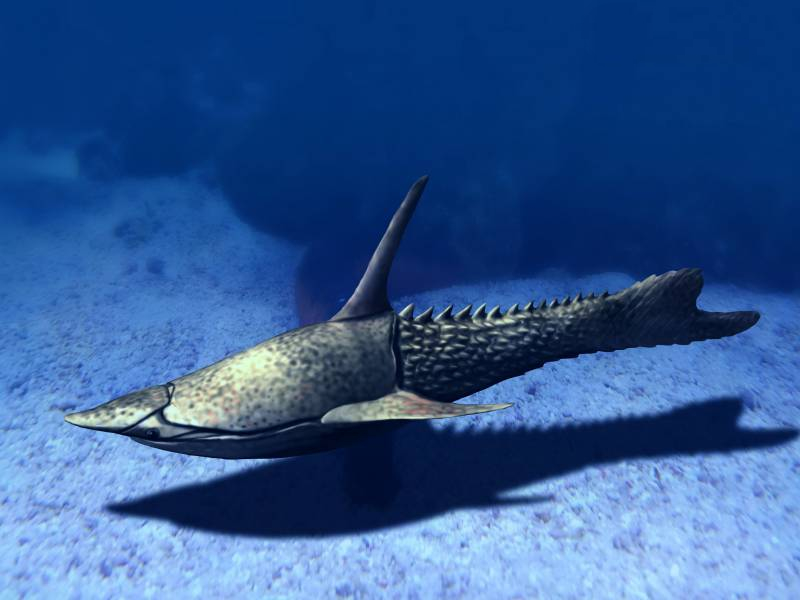
- 3D reconstruction of P. lerichei

Scientific classification
- Kingdom: Animalia
- Phylum: Chordata
- Infraphylum: Agnatha
- Class: †Pteraspidomorpha
- Subclass: †Heterostraci
- Order: †Pteraspidiformes
- Family: †Pteraspididae
- Genus: †Podolaspis; Zych, 1931

Type species
- †Podolaspis lerichei Zych, 1931

Other species
- †Podolaspis danieli

= Podolaspis =

Podolaspis Temporal range: Early Devonian

Extinct genus of jawless fishes

Podolaspis is an extinct genus of pteraspidid heterostracan agnathan which existed during the early Devonian period. It was originally described by Zych in 1931, and contains the species P. lerichei, and P. danieli.
