= Althaspis =

Althaspis Temporal range: Early Devonian

Scientific classification
- Kingdom: Animalia
- Phylum: Chordata
- Infraphylum: Agnatha
- Class: †Pteraspidomorpha
- Subclass: †Heterostraci
- Order: †Pteraspidiformes
- Family: †Pteraspididae
- Genus: †Althaspis; Zych, 1931

Extinct genus of jawless fishes

Althaspis is an extinct genus of pteraspidid heterostracan agnathan. Fossils are found in Early Devonian-aged marine strata of Europe
