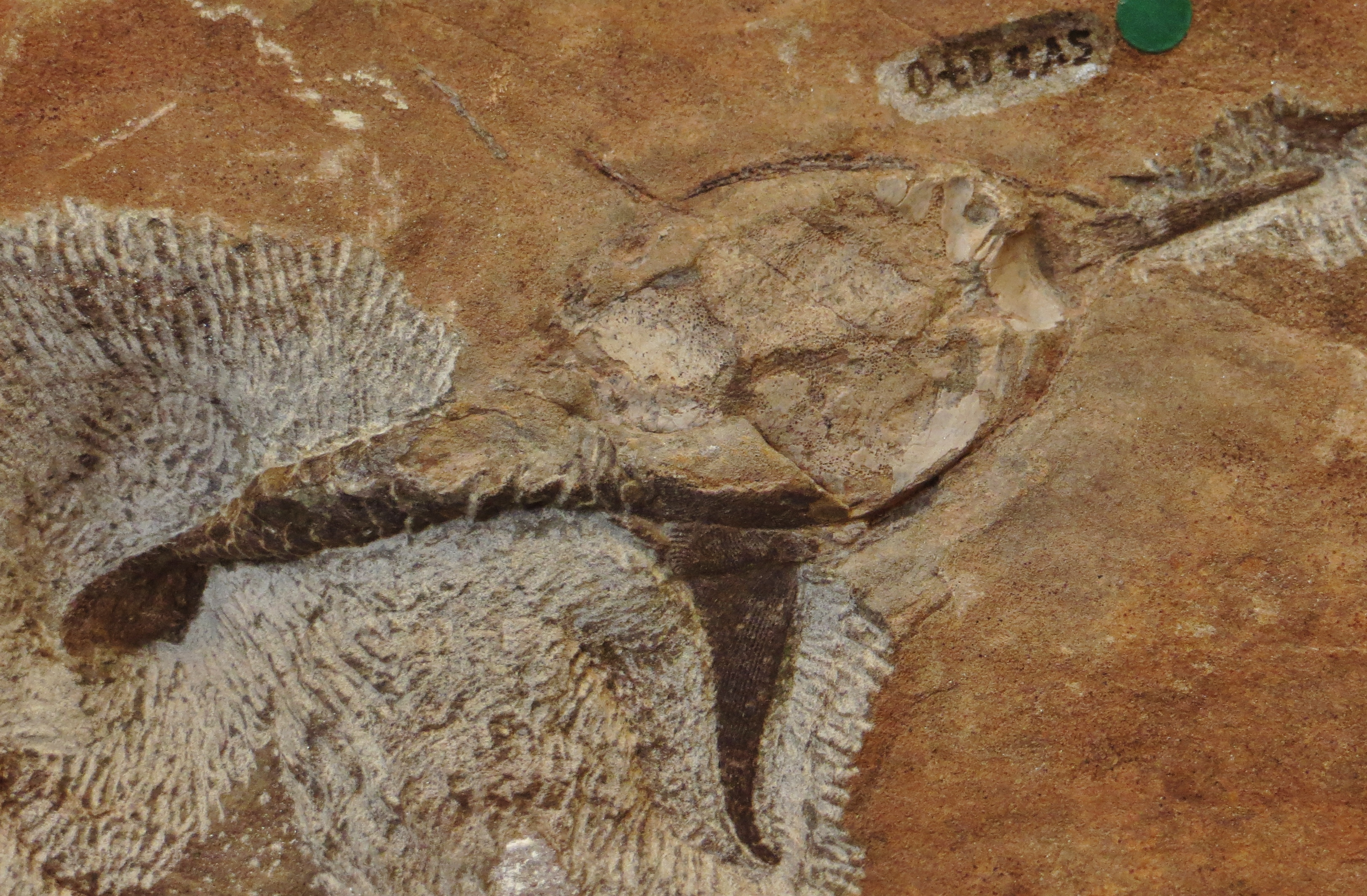
- Fossil of Doryaspis nathorsti (Specimen MNHN.F.SVD870) at the National Museum of Natural History, France
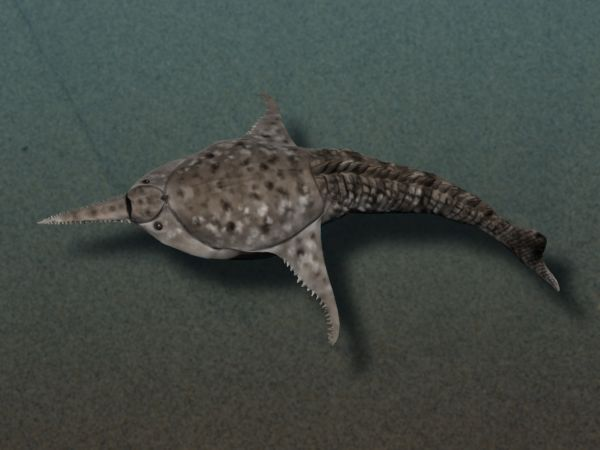
- Life reconstruction of D. nathorsti

Scientific classification
- Kingdom: Animalia
- Phylum: Chordata
- Infraphylum: Agnatha
- Class: †Pteraspidomorpha
- Subclass: †Heterostraci
- Order: †Pteraspidiformes
- Family: †Doryaspididae
- Genus: †Doryaspis; White 1935

Type species
- †Doryaspis nathorsti (Lankester 1884)

Species
- †D. nathorsti (Lankester, 1884); †D. lyktensis (Heintz, 1960); †D. minor (Heintz, 1960); †D. arctica Pernègre, 2002; †D. groenhorgensis Pernègre, 2005

Synonyms
- Genus synonymy: "Dyreaspis" A.Heintz, 1934; Lyktaspis N.Heintz, 1968; Grumantaspis Obruchev, 1964; Ennosveaspis Stensiö, 1964; Species synonymy: Scaphaspis nathorstii (Lankester, 1884); Pteraspis nathorsti (Woodward, 1891); Pteraspis? lyktensis (N.Heintz, 1960); Pteraspis? minor (N.Heintz, 1960); Grumantaspis lyktensis (Obruchev, 1964); Ennosveaspis minor (Stensiö, 1964); Lyktaspis nathorsti (N.Heintz, 1968)

= Doryaspis =

Doryaspis Temporal range: Early Devonian (Pragian to Emsian), ~410.8–393.47 Ma

Extinct genus of jawless fish

Doryaspis is an extinct genus of armored jawless fish belonging to the order Pteraspidiformes. It contains five species, all of which are exclusively known from what is now the island of Spitsbergen in the Svalbard archipelago of Norway. The genus lived during the Pragian to Emsian ages of the Early Devonian period. Doryaspis is distinguished from other pteraspidiforms by several unusual features, most notably its narrow, outward-pointing cornual plates and a long, pointed projection near its mouth known as a pseudorostrum.

== Discovery and research history ==
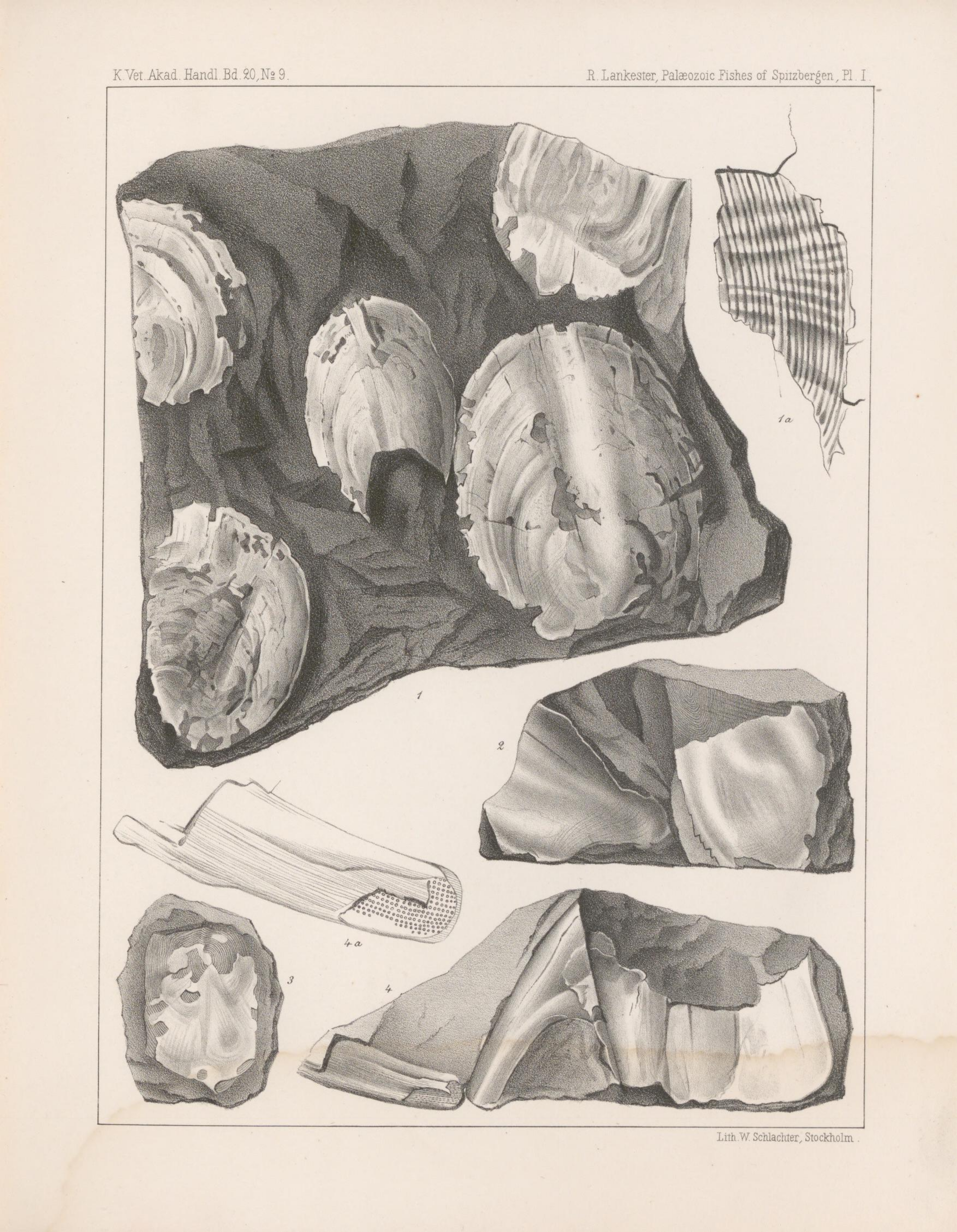
Lithograph featuring the first known fossils of Doryaspis, described as a species of the now-invalid genus Scaphaspis (figures 1–3)

Fossils of what would later be described as Doryaspis were first discovered by Alfred Gabriel Nathorst during a Swedish expedition to Spitsbergen in 1882. The fossils consisted of several disarticulated ventral armor plates recovered from the Wood Bay Formation. Two years later, zoologist Edwin Ray Lankester identified these as the bony cephalic (head) shield of a cephalaspid fish, a group that pteraspidomorphs were, at the time, thought to belong to. He noted that the fossils were similar in form to those of Scaphaspis lloydii from England and established a new species for the specimens, Scaphaspis nathorstii. In the year 1900, Scaphaspis was deemed synonymous with Pteraspis, and Arthur Smith Woodward reassigned these fossils under the name Pteraspis nathorsti. Johan Aschehoug Kiær later studied the material and recognized it as representing a taxon distinct from Pteraspis, establishing the genus Doryaspis to refer to the plates. However, before Kiær's work could be published, paleontologist Anatol Heintz used the name "Dyreaspis" for the same specimens in 1934. This name never received an official diagnosis and is considered a nomen nudum. Kiær passed away before his study could be published, but his work was eventually utilized by geologist Errol Ivor White who recognized the genus Doryaspis in 1935.

In 1967, it was discovered the name Doryaspis had already been used for a genus of beetles described in 1835. According to the International Code of Zoological Nomenclature, no two taxa may share the same name, and the earlier named taxon has priority. To resolve this conflict, paleontologist Natascha Heintz created the genus Lyktaspis to replace the name established by Kiær. However, in 1970, it was determined by Robert Denison that the beetle genus should be considered a nomen nudum and was therefore invalid. As a result, Doryaspis continues to be used as the valid name for the fish genus.

== Description ==
=== Headshield ===
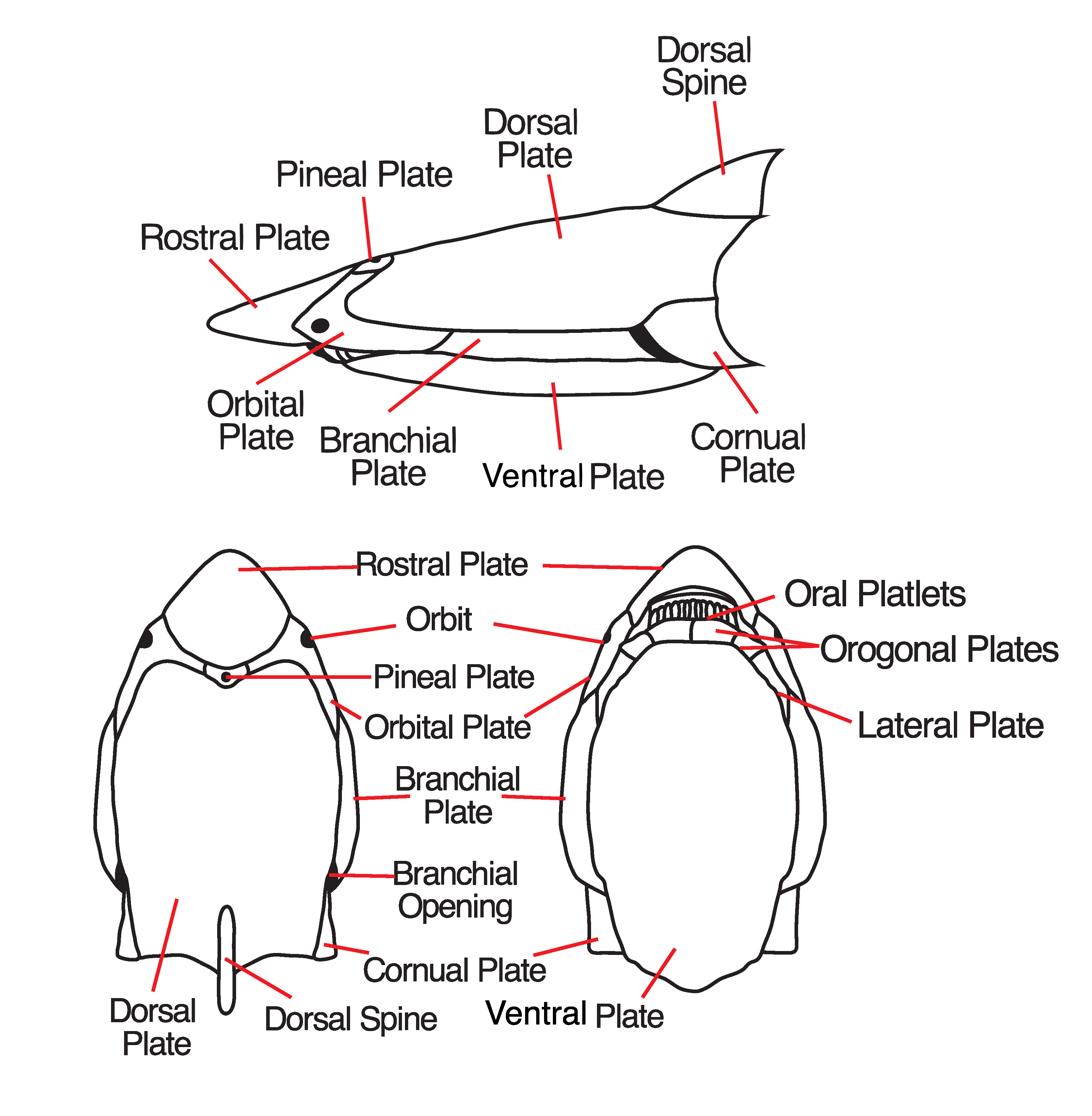
Diagrammatic reconstruction of a generalized pteraspid headshield, lacking the pseudorostrum unique to Doryaspis.

Like other heterostracans, the front half of Doryaspis was covered in several stiff plates of bony armor collectively known as a headshield. The headshield had a broad, flat topside and a rounded underside. The two largest plates, the dorsal and ventral plates, (Note: Also called the "dorsal disc" and "ventral disc".) were ornamented with a radiating pattern of concentric ridges which bore small tubercles arranged in a chevron pattern. Additionally, both plates were covered in a system of sensory canals. In front of the dorsal plate were two orbital plates that formed a crescent shape wrapping around the dorsal plate. Each plate had protrusions that projected the eye opening outwards. In front of the orbital plates was a small, semicircular rostral plate. Between the rostral plate and the dorsal plate was a tiny pineal plate. Some species possessed a small spine that projected upward on the back of the dorsal plate, however, this spine is not considered the same structure as the "dorsal spine" in other pteraspids. The underside of the animal was formed by three plates: the ventral plate and a pair of orogonal plates (Note: The orogonal plates are equivalent to the "postoral plates" in other pteraspids.) near the mouth.

On either side of the headshield were two wing-like cornual plates. The cornual plates were a shared feature of most heterostracans but were exceptionally long and narrow in Doryaspis. The cornual plates had a similar tubercle ornamentation to the dorsal and ventral plates. In some species, the tubercles along the forward-facing edge of the cornual plates were modified into hook-shaped denticles. The shape and size of the cornual plates in Doryaspis varied greatly between species.

==== Mouth ====
As an agnathan, Doryaspis possessed no jaws. The mouth opening sat between the orogonal plates and the rostral plate and faced upward rather than forward or downward, an unusual orientation among pteraspidomorphs. Projecting forward from between the orogonal plates was a pointed, blade-like appendage called the pseudorostrum. It has been suggested that the pseudorostrum may be a greatly enlarged and modified middlemost oral plate, though this has not been conclusively established. In some species, the edges of the pseudorostrum bore small hook-shaped denticles similar to those on the cornual plates. The lower edge of the mouth also bore two triangular “lateral oral plates” which flanked the pseudorostrum on either side. These plates were not capable of opening and closing the mouth, unlike the oral plates in other pteraspidomorphs.

=== Trunk and tail ===
Behind the headshield, the body of Doryaspis was covered in large, overlapping scales arranged in six rows. Along the top and bottom midlines of the body ran a row of teardrop-shaped "ridge scales". On each side of the body between these ridge scales were two rows of rhombus-shaped "flank scales". Each ridge scale overlapped two to four of the upper flank scales beside it, which in turn overlapped the lower flank scales, which were themselves overlapped by the ventral ridge scales. Between fifteen and twenty flank scales could be present in each row along the length of the trunk. This relatively simple scale arrangement, with only two rows of flank scales on each side, is considered more primitive than that of most other pteraspidiforms, which typically possessed many more rows of smaller scales.

The tail fin is known only from a single specimen of D. nathorsti. It consisted of three lobes with a thin membrane of tiny scales connecting them. The fin was likely homocercal, meaning that the upper and lower lobes were roughly equal in size.

== Species ==
The genus Doryaspis comprises five species, all recovered from the Wood Bay Formation of Spitsbergen. The morphology varies considerably between species. An undescribed sixth species is also known, recovered in association with D. nathorsti. It is poorly preserved, but was larger than D. nathorsti, making it the largest known representative of the genus.

The various species of Doryaspis, alongside other genera, have been utilized as guide fossils to identify the biotic divisions of the Wood Bay Formation. This formation has been stratigraphically described under two regional frameworks. The Woodfjorden area of northwestern Spitsbergen uses four faunal divisions (from oldest to youngest: Sigurdfjellet, Kapp Kjeldsen, Keltiefjellet, and Stjørdalen). The Dicksonfjorden-Austfjorden area of southeastern Spitsbergen instead uses three lithostratigraphic members (Austfjorden, Dicksonfjorden, and Verdalen) which correspond to the Sigurdfjellet and Kapp Kjeldsen, Keltiefjellet, and Stjørdalen divisions respectively.

=== Doryaspis nathorsti ===
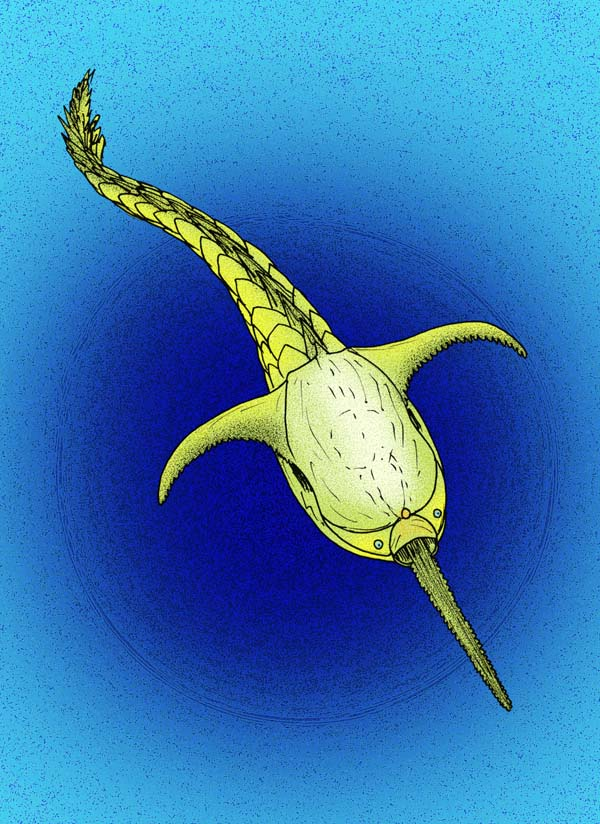
Artist's reconstruction of Doryaspis nathorsti

Doryaspis nathorsti is the type species of the genus, described by Lankester in 1884 on the basis of material collected by Nathorst. It is the largest described species of Doryaspis, with a maximum dorsal plate length of 70 mm (2.8 in). D. nathorsti is distinguished by large cornual plates that extended sideways from the body and curved downwards and slightly forward near the tips. Both the front edge of the cornual plates and the edges of the pseudorostrum bore denticles. Between the plates around the gill opening were four or five small "accessory plates", a feature not observed in other species of the genus. D. nathorsti is present throughout the upper Kapp Kjeldsen division and the entire Keltiefjellet division in the Woodfjorden area and the majority of the Dicksonfjorden Member in the Dicksonfjorden-Austfjorden area.

=== Doryaspis lyktensis ===
Doryaspis lyktensis was originally described in 1960 by Natascha Heintz as a possible species of Pteraspis, P.? lyktensis. Four years later, Dmitry Obruchev placed the species in its own genus, Grumantaspis. In 1984, Grumantaspis was deemed synonymous with Doryaspis by Blieck. The species is known from a single slab bearing three more or less complete dorsal plates, four more or less complete ventral plates, and several fragments, leaving much of its biology unknown. These dorsal plates measured approximately 18 to 20 mm (0.71 to 0.79 in) in length. D. lyktensis did not possess a spine on the dorsal plate. D. lyktensis is present in the uppermost Kapp Kjeldsen division in the Woodfjorden area and most of the Dicksonfjorden Member in the Dicksonfjorden-Austfjorden area.

A fossil recovered from the Ben Nevis Formation bears close resemblance to D. lyktensis. This formation directly underlies the Wood Bay Formation and is Lochkovian in age, which would make this the oldest known specimen of Doryaspis and the first known outside of the Wood Bay Formation. However, this fossil has not yet been confidently referred to the genus or species.

=== Doryaspis minor ===
Doryaspis minor has a very similar taxonomic history to that of D. lyktensis. It was described in 1960 by Natascha Heintz as Pteraspis? minor, moved to its own genus Ennosveaspis by Erik Stensiö in 1964, and subsequently synonymized with Doryaspis by Blieck in 1984. D. minor is known from only four plates total, comprising one nearly complete dorsal plate measuring 14 mm (0.55 in) in length, one additional fragmentary dorsal plate, and two fragmentary ventral plates, making it the most poorly documented and smallest known species of Doryaspis. Like D. lyktensis, this species lacked a dorsal spine on the dorsal plate. The distribution of the species is poorly understood, though the known material likely comes from the Stjørdalen division in the Woodfjorden area.

=== Doryaspis arctica ===
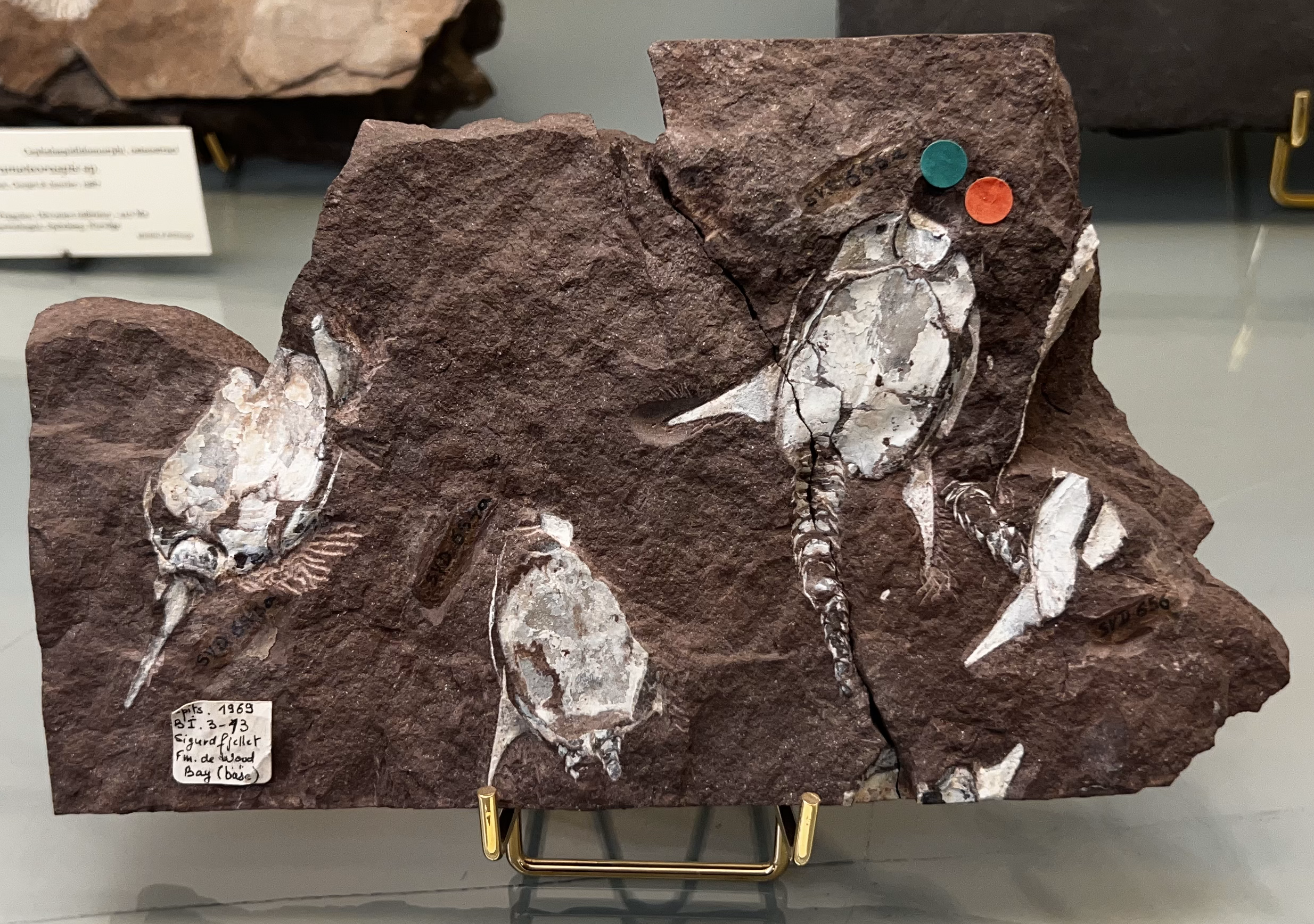
A congregation of Doryaspis arctica fossils (Specimens MNHN.F.SVD653–655) preserved in a single slab at the National Museum of Natural History, France

Doryaspis arctica was described in 2002 by Vincent Noël Pernègre. The specific name, arctica, is in reference to the species' fossils originating from the arctic archipelago of Svalbard. This species' dorsal plate was up to 60 mm (2.4 in) long. In this species, the cornual plates were narrow, lacked denticles, and were angled slightly backwards without any noticeable curve. D. arctica is present throughout the entire Sigurdfjellet division and most of the Kapp Kjeldsen division in the Woodfjorden area.

=== Doryaspis groenhorgensis ===
Doryaspis groenhorgensis was described in 2005 by Pernègre based on fossils from Grønhorgdalen in Spitsbergen. The dorsal plate of this species was up to 35 mm (1.4 in) long. The ventral plate of D. groenhorgensis comes to a triangular point near the front of the animal, where in other species the plate is rounded. The cornual plates were the smallest known of any species and possessed characteristics intermediate between those of D. nathorsti and D. arctica: they were pointed backwards and lacked denticles as in D. arctica, but had a slight forward curve at the tip as in D. nathorsti. The pseudorostrum was relatively wide and bore denticles, though these were smaller ornamental tubercles instead of the well-developed hooks characteristic of D. nathorsti. The portion of the pseudorostrum that connected to the rest of the headshield was also a shallow V-shape rather than the broader U-shape seen in both D. nathorsti and D. arctica. This species is found throughout the majority of the Austfjorden Member in the Dicksonfjorden-Austfjorden area.

== Paleobiology ==
Like other pteraspidomorphs, Doryaspis lacked any true paired fins and would have relied primarily on its caudal fin to propel itself through its environment. The large, wing-like cornual plates are thought to have functioned as lifting surfaces while swimming, serving a purpose similar to the pectoral fins of other fish. The branchial (gill) openings were located slightly in front of the cornual plates. It has been proposed that these openings may have been used by pteraspidomorphs to stabilize and control their movement by adjusting the flow of ejected water under the cornual plates. A 2024 study by Héctor Botella and colleagues tested life-sized 3D printed models of D. nathorsti in a water tunnel. It was found that the headshield functioned like a delta wing and formed a pair of stable, counter-rotating leading-edge vortices over the top surface during forward motion which generated upward lift.

The exact lifestyle of Doryaspis is not fully understood, owing to its highly unusual anatomy among pteraspidiforms. Two competing hypotheses have been proposed: that Doryaspis was a pelagic, open-water animal living high in the water column, or that Doryaspis was a benthic animal living partially buried in the sediment.

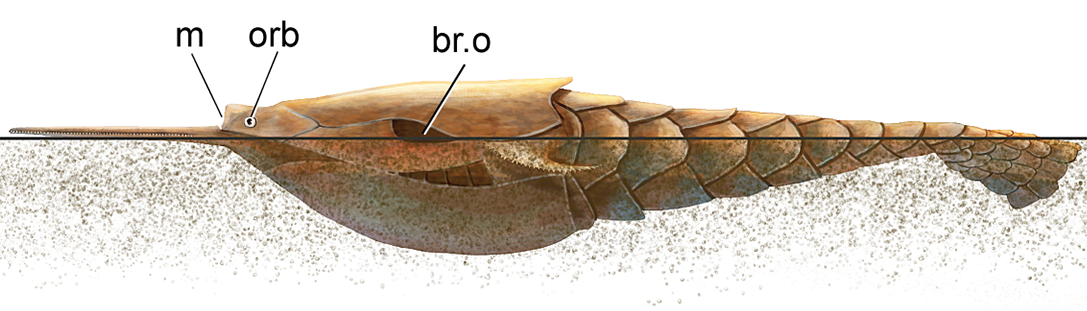
Reconstruction of Doryaspis half-buried in sediment. Whether Doryaspis was capable of burrowing as depicted is debated. Abbreviations: m, mouth; orb, orbital opening; br.o, external branchial opening

The pelagic hypothesis argues that the lift generated by the cornual plates, the homocercal caudal fin, and the hydrodynamic properties of the headshield would have been advantageous for open-water swimming. The upward-facing mouth, flat dorsal plate, and lack of a large dorsal spine may indicate that Doryaspis fed at or near the surface of the water. Additionally, the pseudorostrum is proposed to have been used to skim the surface of the water for food like plankton and direct it into the mouth.

The benthic hypothesis argues that the flat dorsal plate could instead indicate that Doryaspis lived half-buried in the sediment of its environment. It is proposed that long cornual plates and pseudorostrum would have kept the animal stabilized and from sinking further into the substrate. In this scenario, the upturned mouth would have faced away from the ground and could passively filter feed organic matter, which was abundant near the substrate. However, the branchial openings would have been susceptible to being blocked by sediment in this mode of life, which would have suffocated the animal. It has been proposed that Doryaspis could have possessed a soft tissue covering over the branchial openings in life in order to keep out sediment.

In 2005, Pernègre concluded that the available evidence slightly favored the pelagic interpretation, though neither hypothesis could be definitively ruled out. Some subsequent studies have erroneously cited this conclusion as supporting the burrowing behavior. The 2024 hydrodynamics study by Botella found that D. nathorsti performed better near the substrate compared to the more streamlined pteraspidiform Panamintaspis snowi, which performed well in open water. This was interpreted as indicating a benthic lifestyle for D. nathorsti with the capacity for short bursts into the water column.

== Paleoecology ==
Doryaspis is only definitively known from the Wood Bay Formation and is present throughout all four biostratigraphic divisions. It is the most abundant heterostracan in the formation.

The paleoenvironment of the Wood Bay Formation is not well understood. Sedimentological evidence from the formation indicates a terrestrial setting of floodplains, rivers, and lakes in a semi-arid, monsoonal climate. However, certain fossils recovered from the formation are traditionally associated with marine environments, leading to some authors to argue that the Wood Bay Formation may instead represent a coastal environment such as an estuary or fjord.

Doryaspis coexisted with a diverse assemblage of early vertebrates. Other heterostracans, osteostracans, and thelodonts are all known from the formation, as are jawed fish including placoderms, acanthodians, and lobe-finned fish.

== See also ==
- Pycnosteus, a psammosteid heterostracan with similar wing-like cornual plates
- Alienacanthus, an arthrodire placoderm with an extended, tooth-covered lower jaw that has been compared to Doryaspis nathorsti's denticled pseudorostrum
