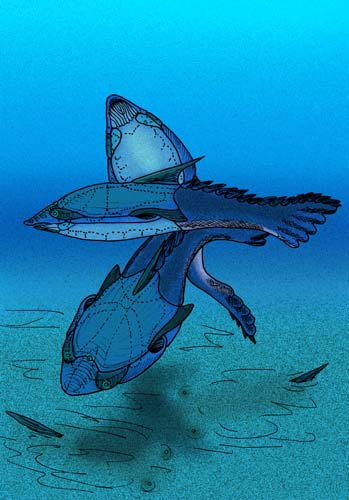
- Reconstruction of P. gosseleti

Scientific classification
- Kingdom: Animalia
- Phylum: Chordata
- Infraphylum: Agnatha
- Class: †Pteraspidomorpha
- Subclass: †Heterostraci
- Order: †Pteraspidiformes
- Family: †Protopteraspididae
- Genus: †Protopteraspis; Leriche, 1924

= Protopteraspis =

Protopteraspis Temporal range: Early Devonian

Extinct genus of jawless fishes

Protopteraspis is an extinct genus of pteraspidid heterostracan agnathan with fossils known from Lower Devonian marine strata in Western Europe. The animal's somewhat flat build has led some to believe that it was a bottom dweller, living in freshwater areas. It has been described as "somewhat unspecialized". Its snout was round and narrow, shorter than that of its immediate relatives. Protopteraspis also did not possess the cornua (horns) found on the headshields of other pterapsids; rather, it had "small points" behind the gill opening. It did possess a "medium-sized" dorsal spine. Plates covering the headshield had ridges of dentine. It is theorized that the headshield formed in youth and that it grew via growth of the plates, which fused in adulthood. The scales of the animal were "small and diamond shaped".
