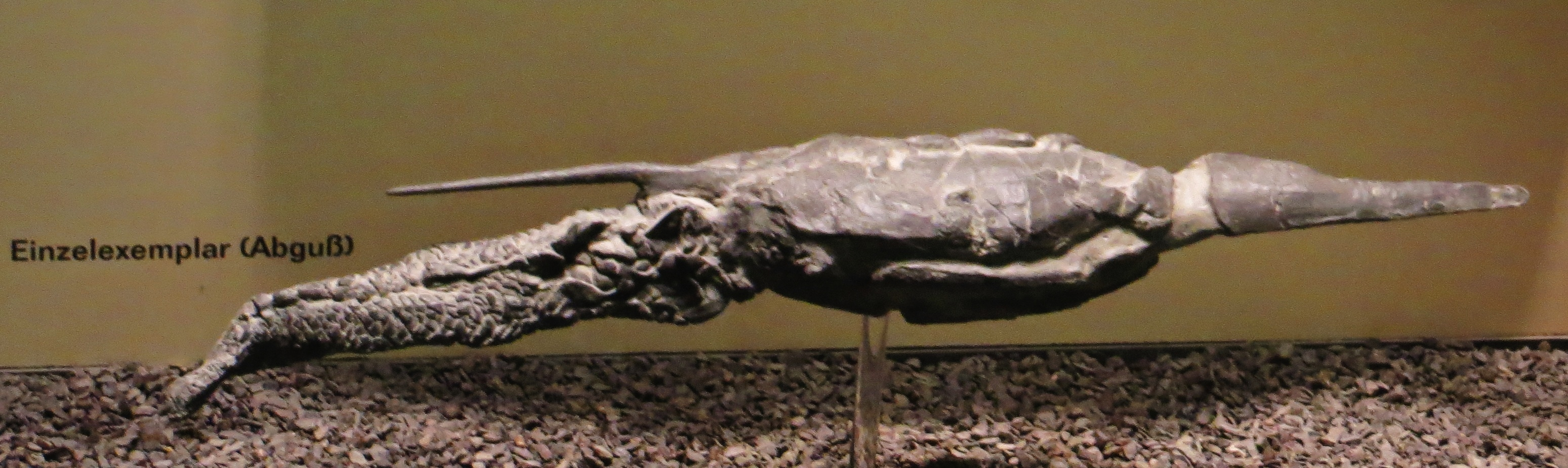
- R. dunensis, Senckenberg Museum of Frankfurt

Scientific classification
- Kingdom: Animalia
- Phylum: Chordata
- Infraphylum: Agnatha
- Class: †Pteraspidomorpha
- Subclass: †Heterostraci
- Order: †Pteraspidiformes
- Family: †Pteraspididae
- Genus: †Rhinopteraspis; Jaekel, 1919

= Rhinopteraspis =

Rhinopteraspis Temporal range: Early Devonian

Genus of jawless fishes

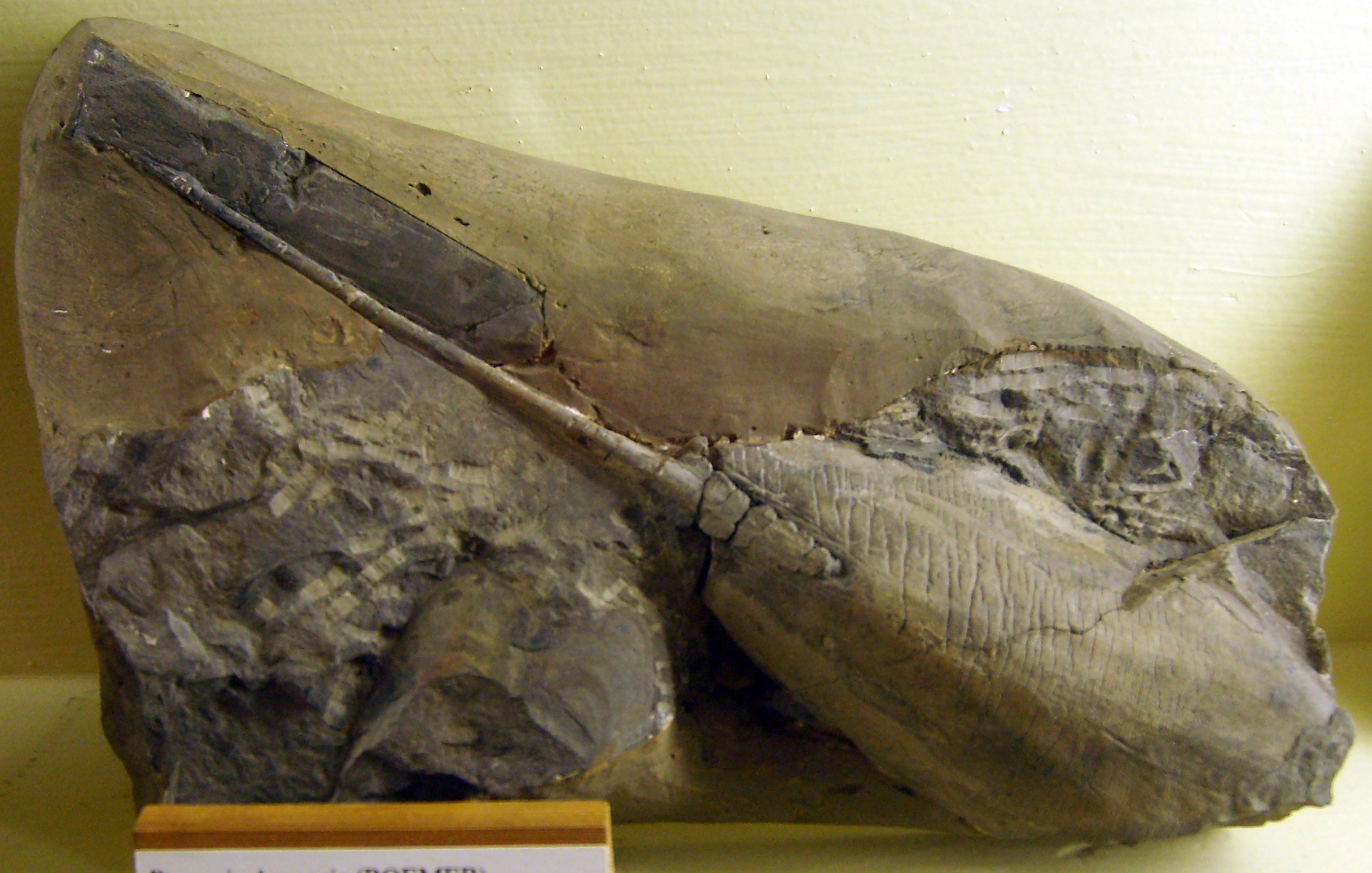
R. dunensis dorsal view of armour, Museum für Naturkunde, Berlin

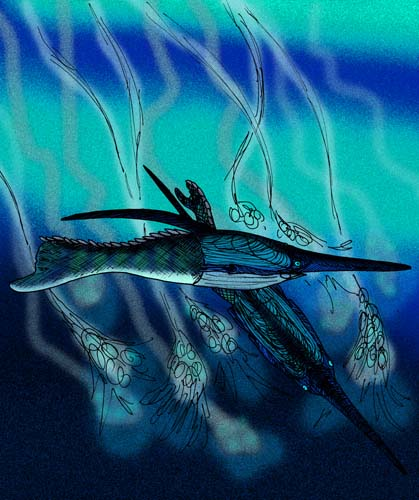
Restoration of R. dunensis

Rhinopteraspis is an extinct genus of pteraspidid heterostracan agnathan.
