= Errivaspis =

Errivaspis Temporal range: Lochkovian
- Fossil specimen of Errivaspis wayensis (NHMUK PV P 16789)

Scientific classification
- Kingdom: Animalia
- Phylum: Chordata
- Infraphylum: Agnatha
- Class: †Pteraspidomorpha
- Subclass: †Heterostraci
- Order: †Pteraspidiformes
- Family: †Pteraspididae
- Genus: †Errivaspis; Blieck, 1984

Type species
- Pteraspis rostrata var. waynensis White, 1935

Species
- E. waynensis (White, 1935); E. depressa (Stensio, 1958); E. magnipinealis (Brotzen, 1933)

Synonyms
- Plesiopteraspis depressa Stensio, 1958; Pteraspis magnipinealis Brotzen, 1933; Pteraspis major Zych, 1927

Extinct genus of jawless fishes

Errivaspis is an extinct genus of pteraspid heterostracan agnathan vertebrate known from fossils at the Wayne Hereford Quarry, of Early Devonian England, and of Podolia, Early Devonian Ukraine. It was originally described by Dr. Errol Ivor White as one of five form-variants of Pteraspis rostrata, i.e., "Pteraspis rostrata var. waynesis. In 1984, Alain Blieck moved var. waynesis into its own genus, Errivaspis, which he named after Dr. White. Other later researchers would then mistakenly assume that Blieck synonymized the entire genus of Pteraspis into Errivaspis.

== Description ==
Errivaspis had large dorsal plates and ventral plates, the linking branchial plate, as well as a cornual plate at the side, an orbital plate around the eye. A rostral plate formed a pointed ‘snout’, several small plates around the mouth, and a dorsal spine pointing backwards. The posterior half of the body was covered with small scales. The caudal fin was fan-shaped.

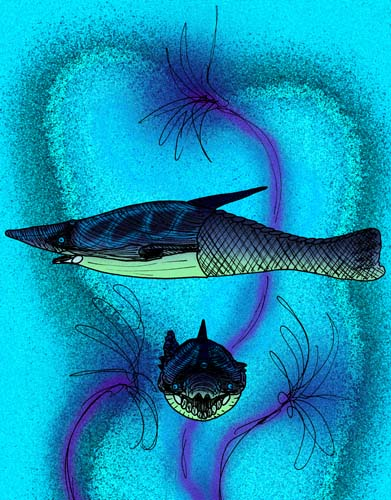
Reconstruction of Errivaspis waynesis
