= Protaspis =

Protaspis Temporal range: Late Emsian

Scientific classification
- Kingdom: Animalia
- Phylum: Chordata
- Infraphylum: Agnatha
- Class: †Pteraspidomorpha
- Subclass: †Heterostraci
- Order: †Pteraspidiformes
- Family: †Protaspididae
- Genus: †Protaspis; Bryant, 1933

Type species
- Pteraspis bucheri (Bryant, 1932)

Extinct genus of jawless fishes

Protaspis is an extinct genus of pteraspidid heterostracan agnathan which lived during the Early Devonian of the United States, with fossils found in marine strata in what is now Utah, Wyoming and Idaho.

The following species are assigned to this genus:

- Protaspis brevirostris Bryant, 1933
- Protaspis brevispina Denison, 1970
- Protaspis bucheri (Bryant, 1932)
- Protaspis cingulus Bryant, 1933
- Protaspis constrictus Bryant, 1933
- Protaspis dorfi (Bryant, 1932)
- Protaspis erroli (Denison, 1967)
- Protaspis mcgrewi Denison, 1970
- Protaspis transversa (Denison, 1970)
