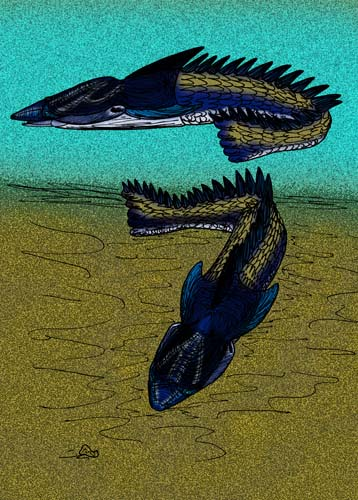
- Artist's impression

Scientific classification
- Kingdom: Animalia
- Phylum: Chordata
- Infraphylum: Agnatha
- Class: †Pteraspidomorpha
- Subclass: †Heterostraci
- Order: †Pteraspidiformes
- Genus: †Lamiaspis; Ilyes & Elliott, 1994
- Species: †L. longiripa

Binomial name
- †Lamiaspis longiripa Ilyes & Elliott, 1994

= Lamiaspis =

Lamiaspis Temporal range: Early Devonian

Extinct genus of jawless fishes

Lamiaspis longiripa is an extinct pteraspid heterostracan agnathan vertebrate found in marine strata of Early Devonian Nevada.

The generic name translates as "shark shield", in reference to its shark-like hydrodynamic shape.
