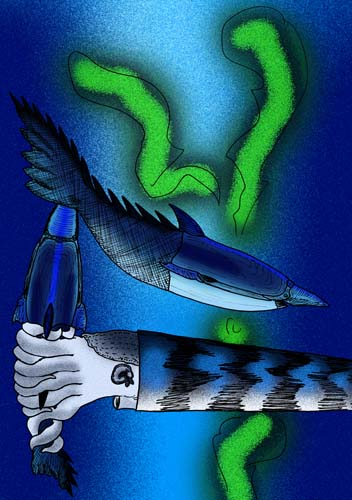
- Artist's reconstruction

Scientific classification
- Kingdom: Animalia
- Phylum: Chordata
- Infraphylum: Agnatha
- Class: †Pteraspidomorpha
- Subclass: †Heterostraci
- Order: †Pteraspidiformes
- Family: †Pteraspididae
- Genus: †Blieckaspis; Elliot & Ilyes, 1996
- Species: †B. priscillae

Binomial name
- †Blieckaspis priscillae (Denison, 1953)

Synonyms
- Protaspis priscillae Denison, 1953; Pteraspis priscillae (Denison, 1953) Denison, 1970; Errivaspis? priscillae (Denison, 1953) Blieck, 1984

= Blieckaspis =

Blieckaspis Temporal range: Late Emsian

Genus of jawless fishes

Blieckaspis priscillae is a pteraspidid heterostracan agnathan from the Middle Devonian of North America.

Blieckaspis priscillae was originally described by Robert Denison from incomplete remains from Late Emsian-aged marine strata in Water Canyon, Utah, as a member of the genus Protaspis, naming it after one Priscilla Turnbull. As more, successively better preserved fossils were found, Denison later revised his findings and placed Protaspis priscillae into Pteraspis in 1970.

In 1984, Alain Blieck further revised P. priscillae's classification, and placed it tentatively into Errivaspis. In 1996, after studying even better preserved material found in Late Emsian-aged strata of the Lost Burro Formation in Death Valley, California, Elliott & Ilyes erected a new genus, Blieckaspis, in honor of Blieck, for "P." priscillae.
