= Plate (anatomy) =

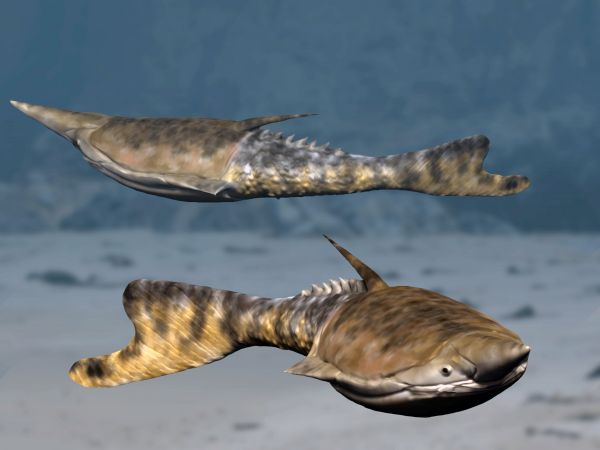
Pteraspidomorphs (Pteraspis shown) are prehistoric jawless fish characterized by their massive dermal head armour having large, median, ventral and dorsal plates or shields.

A plate in animal anatomy may refer to several things:

== Flat bones (examples: bony plates, dermal plates) of vertebrates ==
- an appendage of the Stegosauria group of dinosaurs
- articulated armoured plates covering the head of thorax of Placodermi (literally "plate-skinned"), an extinct class of prehistoric fish (including skull, thoracic and tooth plates)
- bony shields of the Ostracoderms (armored jawless fishes) such as the dermal head armour of members of the class Pteraspidomorphi that include dorsal, ventral, rostral and pineal plates
- plates of a carapace, such as the dermal plates of the shell of a turtle
- dermal plates partly or completely covering the body of the fish in the order Gasterosteiformes that includes the sticklebacks and relatives
- plates of dermal bones of the armadillo
- Zygomatic plate, a bony plate derived from the flattened front part of the zygomatic arch (cheekbone) in rodent anatomy

== Other flat structures ==
- hairy plate-like keratin scales of the pangolin
- Basal plate (disambiguation), several anatomy-related meanings

== Other meanings in human anatomy ==
- Alar plate, a neural structure in the embryonic nervous system
- Cribriform plate, of the ethmoid bone (horizontal lamina) received into the ethmoidal notch of the frontal bone and roofs in the nasal cavities
- Epiphyseal plate, a hyaline cartilage plate in the metaphysis at each end of a long bone
- Lateral pterygoid plate of the sphenoid, a broad, thin and everted bone that forms the lateral part of a horseshoe like process that extends from the inferior aspect of the sphenoid bone
- Nail plate, the hard and translucent portion of the nail
- Perpendicular plate of the ethmoid bone (vertical plate), a thin, flattened lamina, polygonal in form, which descends from the under surface of the cribriform plate, and assists in forming the septum of the nose

== Related structures ==
- Scute, a bony external plate or scale overlaid with horn, as on the shell of a turtle, the skin of crocodilians and the feet of birds
- Sclerite, a plate forming the exoskeleton of invertebrates

== See also ==
- Plate (disambiguation)
