= Anchipteraspididae =

Anchipteraspididae Temporal range: Early Pridolian-Early Devonian

Scientific classification
- Kingdom: Animalia
- Phylum: Chordata
- Infraphylum: Agnatha
- Class: †Pteraspidomorpha
- Subclass: †Heterostraci
- Order: †Pteraspidiformes
- Family: †Anchipteraspididae; Elliot, 1984

Genera
- †Anchipteraspis; †Rhachiaspis; †Ulutitaspis

Synonyms
- Anchipteraspidinae Elliott, 1984

Extinct family of jawless fishes

Anchipteraspididae is an extinct family of heterostracan vertebrates restricted to Late Silurian and Early Devonian strata of Arctic Canada.

Anchipteraspidids superficially resemble the ancestral cyathaspidids, but, the articulation and growth patterns of the plates clearly define them as pteraspidids.
