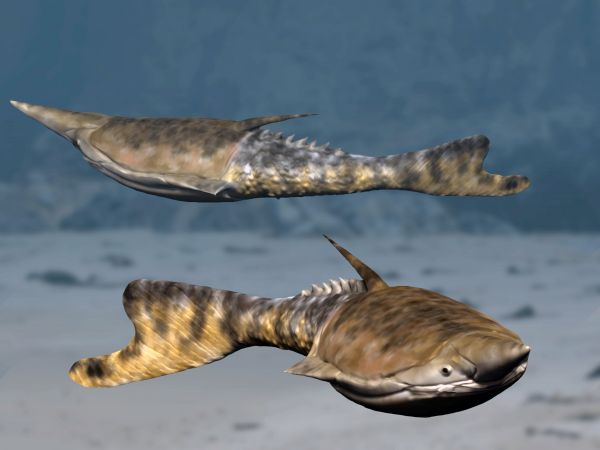
- Artist's restoration of Larnovaspis

Scientific classification
- Kingdom: Animalia
- Phylum: Chordata
- Infraphylum: Agnatha
- Class: †Pteraspidomorpha
- Subclass: †Heterostraci
- Order: †Pteraspidiformes
- Suborder: †Pteraspidoidei
- Family: †Pteraspididae; Claypole, 1885

Type genus
- †Pteraspis Kner & Woodward, 1900

Genera
- See text

Synonyms
- Pteraspidae (paraphyletic)

= Pteraspididae =

Pteraspididae Temporal range: Early to Middle Devonian

Extinct family of jawless fishes

Pteraspididae is an extinct family of heterostracan vertebrates. It is an Early Devonian-aged family that contains the stereotypical, torpedo-shaped pteraspidids, such as the type genus, Pteraspis, and its close relatives Errivaspis and Rhinopteraspis, that are popularly thought to have actively swam about in the water column. The elongated rostral plate is thought to help with their hydrodynamic ability. Various genera are found in various marine and estuarine strata of Early Devonian Europe and North America.

== Genera ==
- †Althaspis
- †Blieckaspis
- †Brachipteraspis
- †Errivaspis
- †Escharaspis
- †Grumantaspis
- †Helaspis
- †Larnovaspis
- †Loricopteraspis
- †Miltaspis
- †Mitraspis
- †Mylopteraspidella
- †Mylopteraspis
- †Podolaspis
- †Pteraspis
- †Rhinopteraspis
- †Stegobranchiaspis
