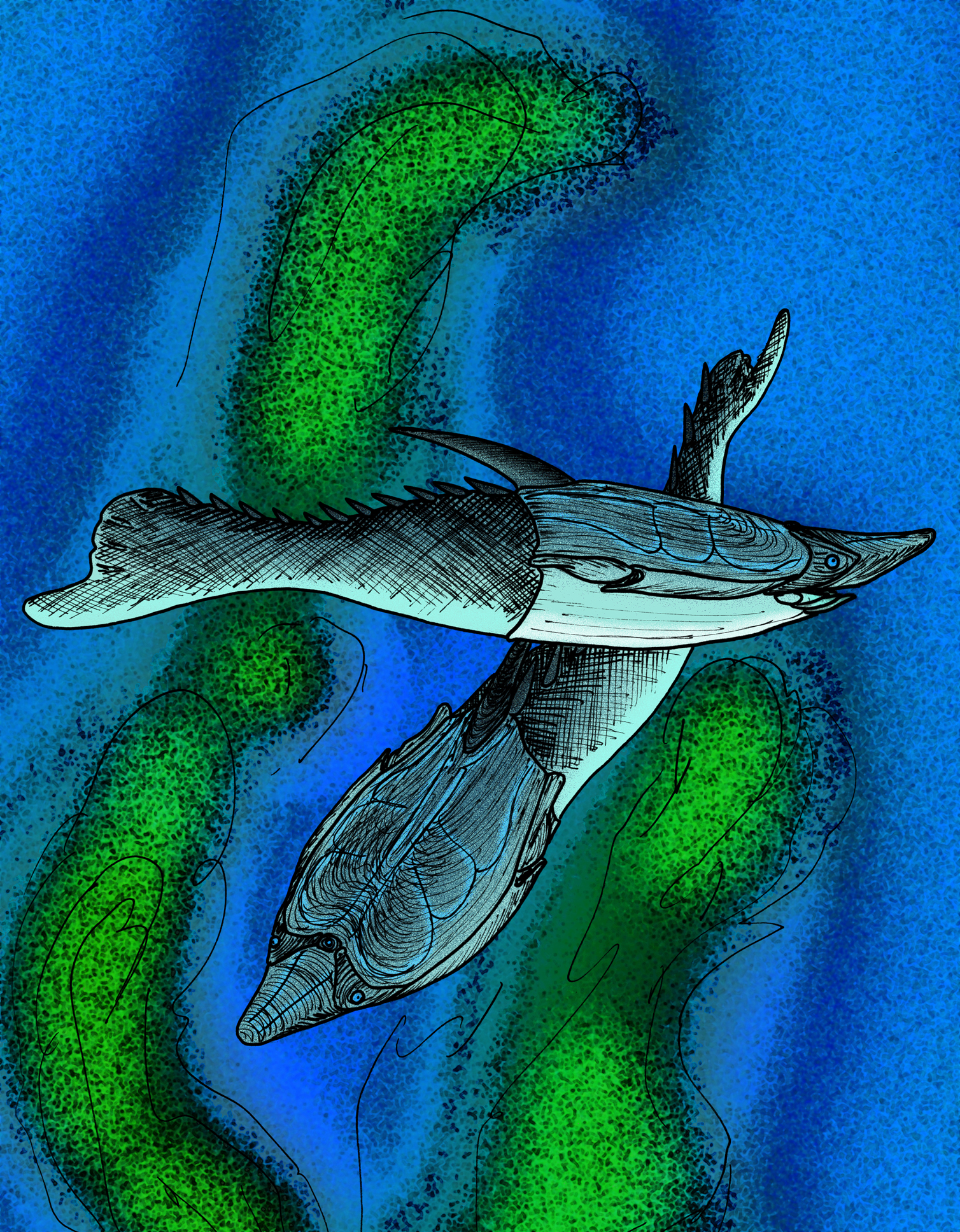
- Restoration of P. rostrata

Scientific classification
- Kingdom: Animalia
- Phylum: Chordata
- Infraphylum: Agnatha
- Class: †Pteraspidomorpha
- Subclass: †Heterostraci
- Order: †Pteraspidiformes
- Family: †Pteraspididae
- Genus: †Pteraspis; Kner, 1847

Type species
- Cephalaspis rostrata Agassiz, 1835

Species
- P. rostrata (Agassiz, 1835); P. dunensis (Roemer, 1854); P. crouchi (Lankester, 1865)

= Pteraspis =

Pteraspis Temporal range: Lochkovian-Eifelian, ~416–386 Ma

Extinct genus of jawless fishes

Pteraspis (from Greek: πτερόν pteron 'wing' or 'fin' and Greek: ἀσπίς aspís 'shield') is an extinct genus of pteraspidid heterostracan jawless fish. It existed from the Lochkovian to Eifelian epochs of the Devonian period in areas that are now the Americas and Europe.

== Description ==
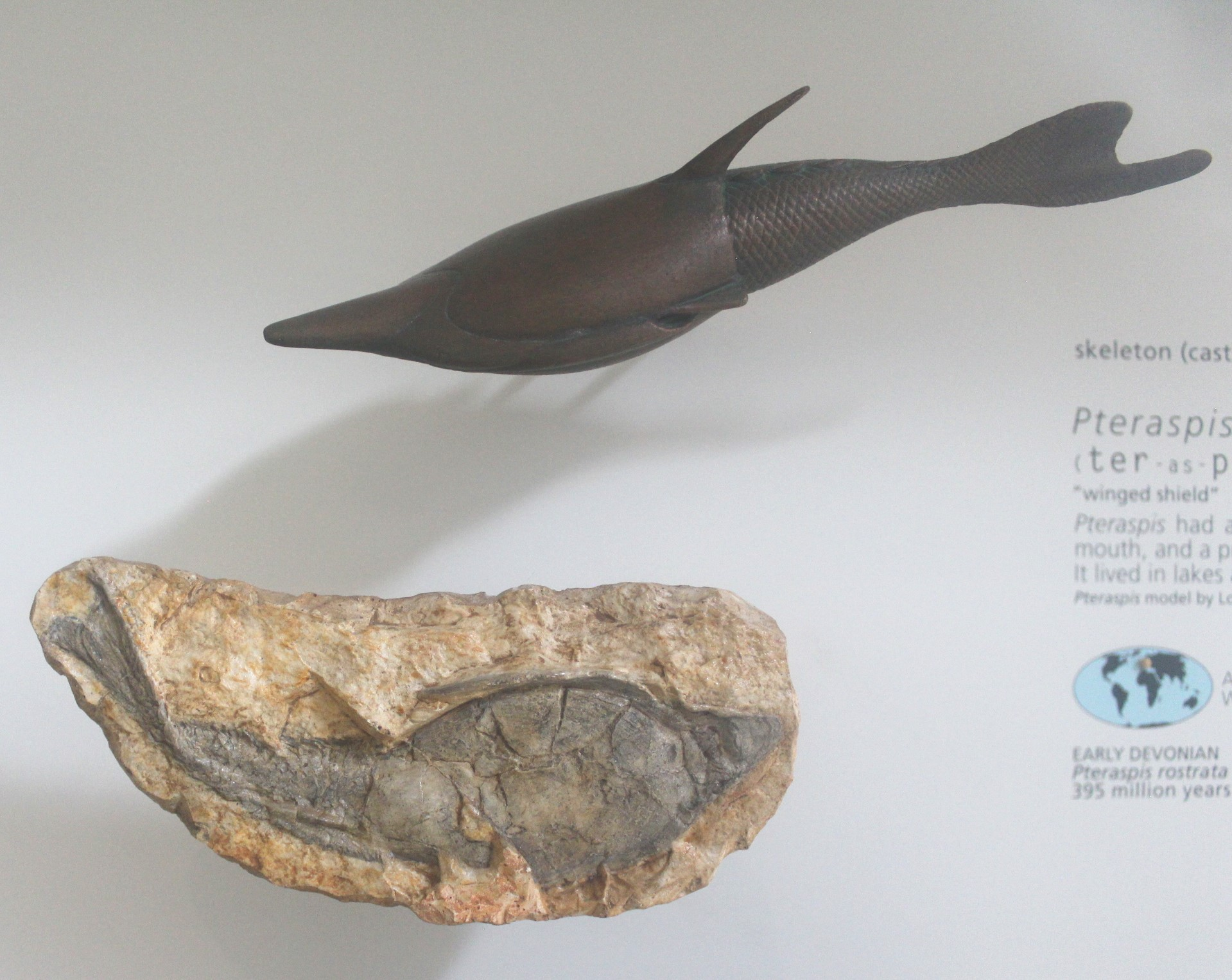
P. rostrata cast of a specimen from England, next to a 1953 plaster model.

Like other heterostracan fishes, Pteraspis had a protective armored plating covering the front of its body, and no fins other than a lobed tail. Despite this, Pteraspis had two wing-like protrusions derived from the armoured plates over its gills, and a single protrusion in the center of its back. This, along with its horn-like rostrum, possibly indicates good swimming ability. Pteraspis also has a series of stiff spines on its back, possibly as a form of protection against predators. It is thought to have fed from shoals of plankton just under the ocean surface. Some records are found in association with marine fossils, while some others are found in freshwater environments.

The largest recorded specimens of Pteraspis grew to an estimated length of 27 centimetres (11 in).

== Gallery ==
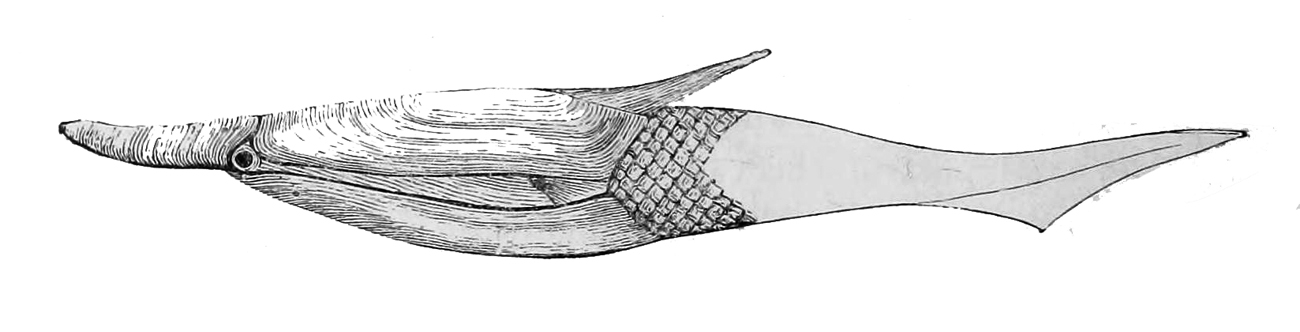
1908 P. rostrata reconstruction

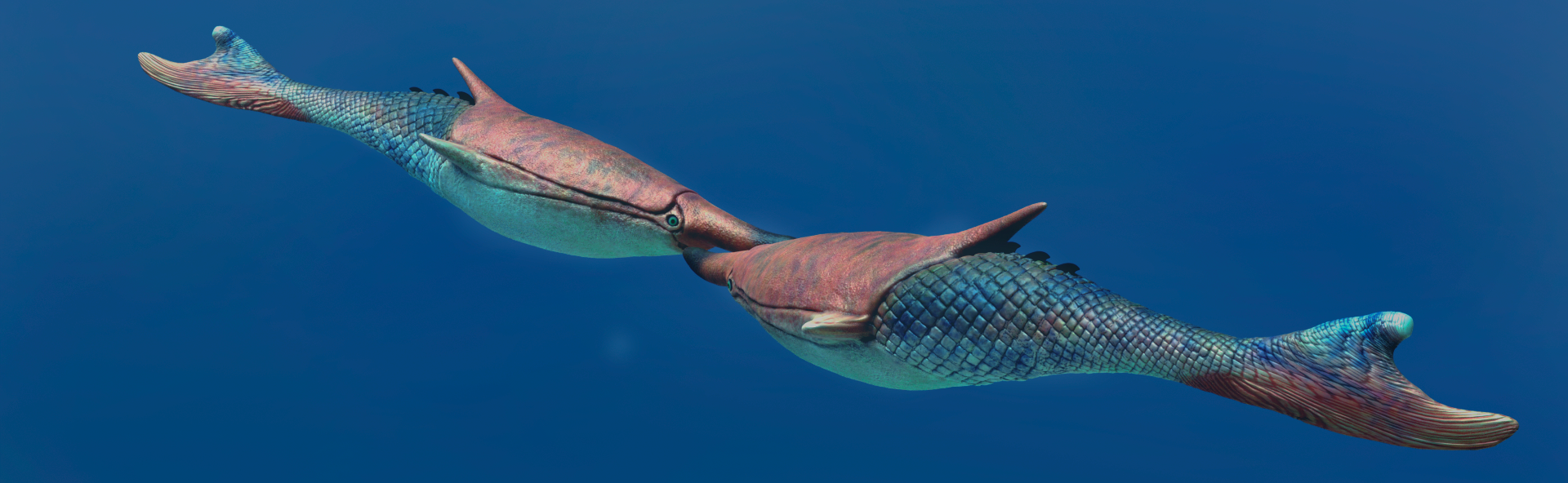
2024 P. rostrata reconstruction.

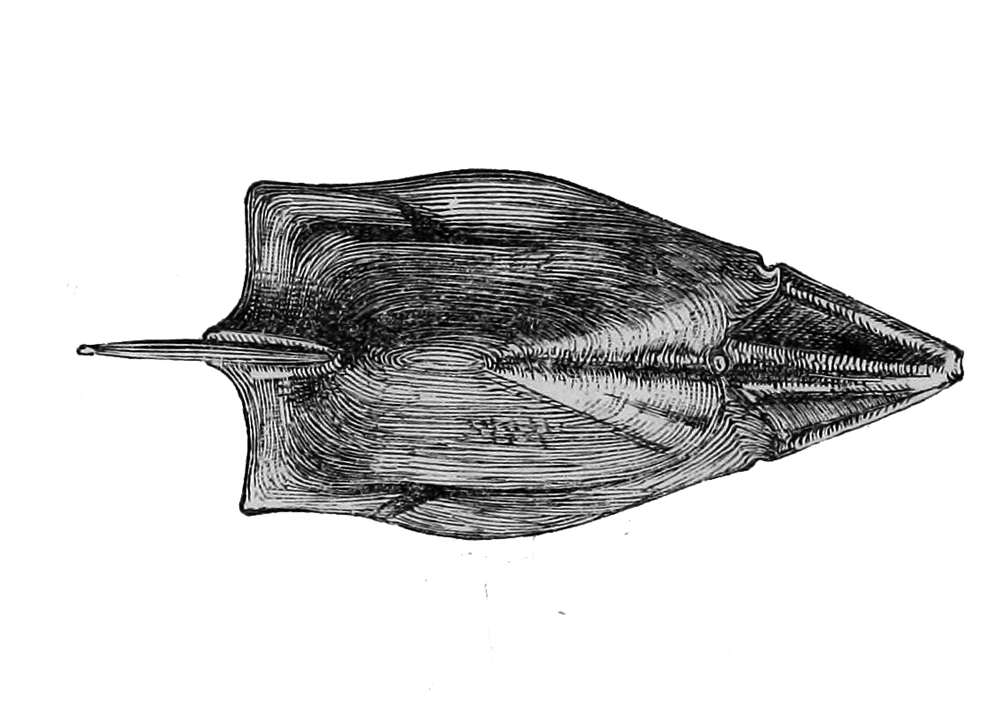
1908 illustration of P. rostrata's dorsal shield.

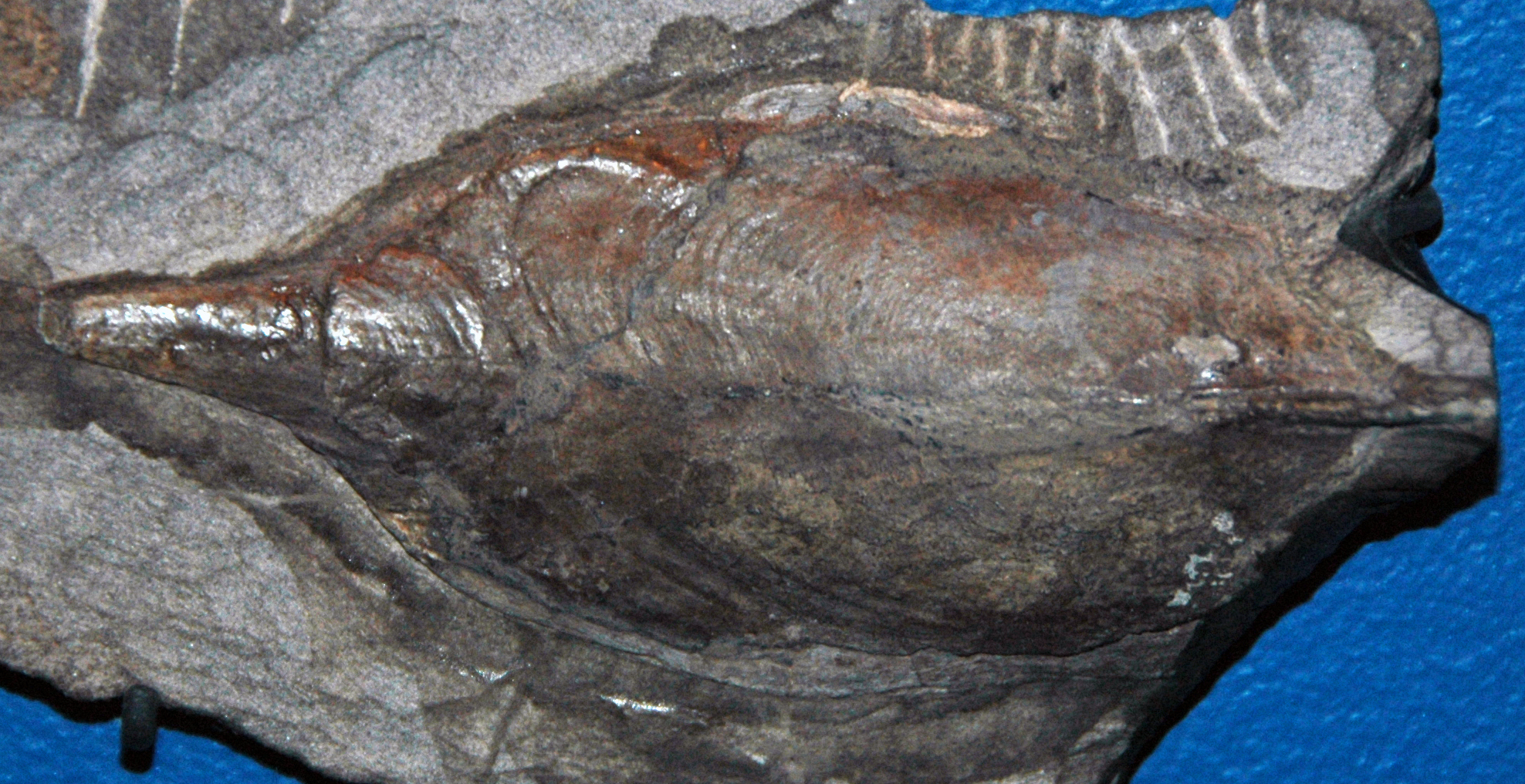
P. crouchi from Britain, at the FMNH.

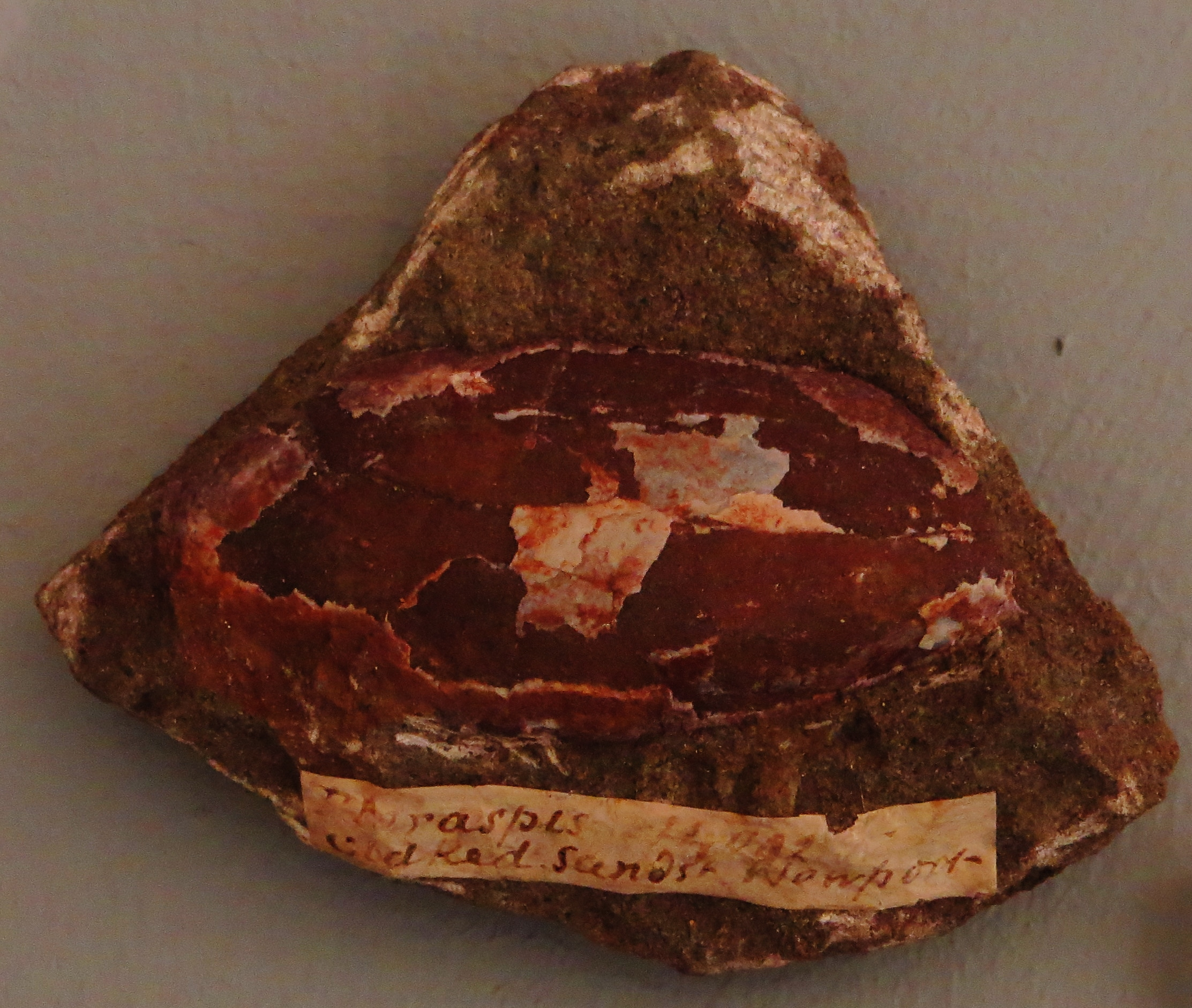
P. rostrata fossil

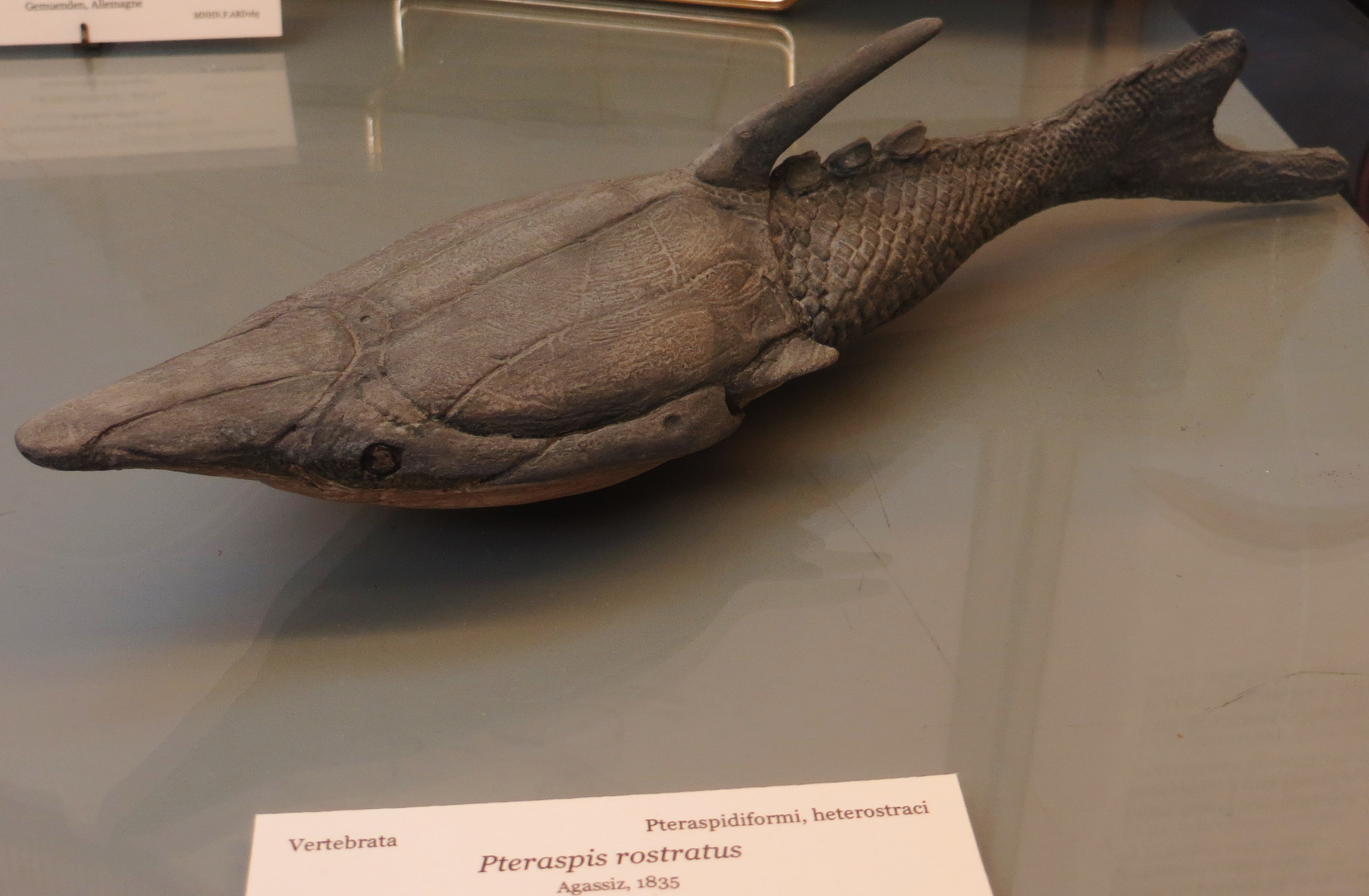
P. rostrata reconstruction.
