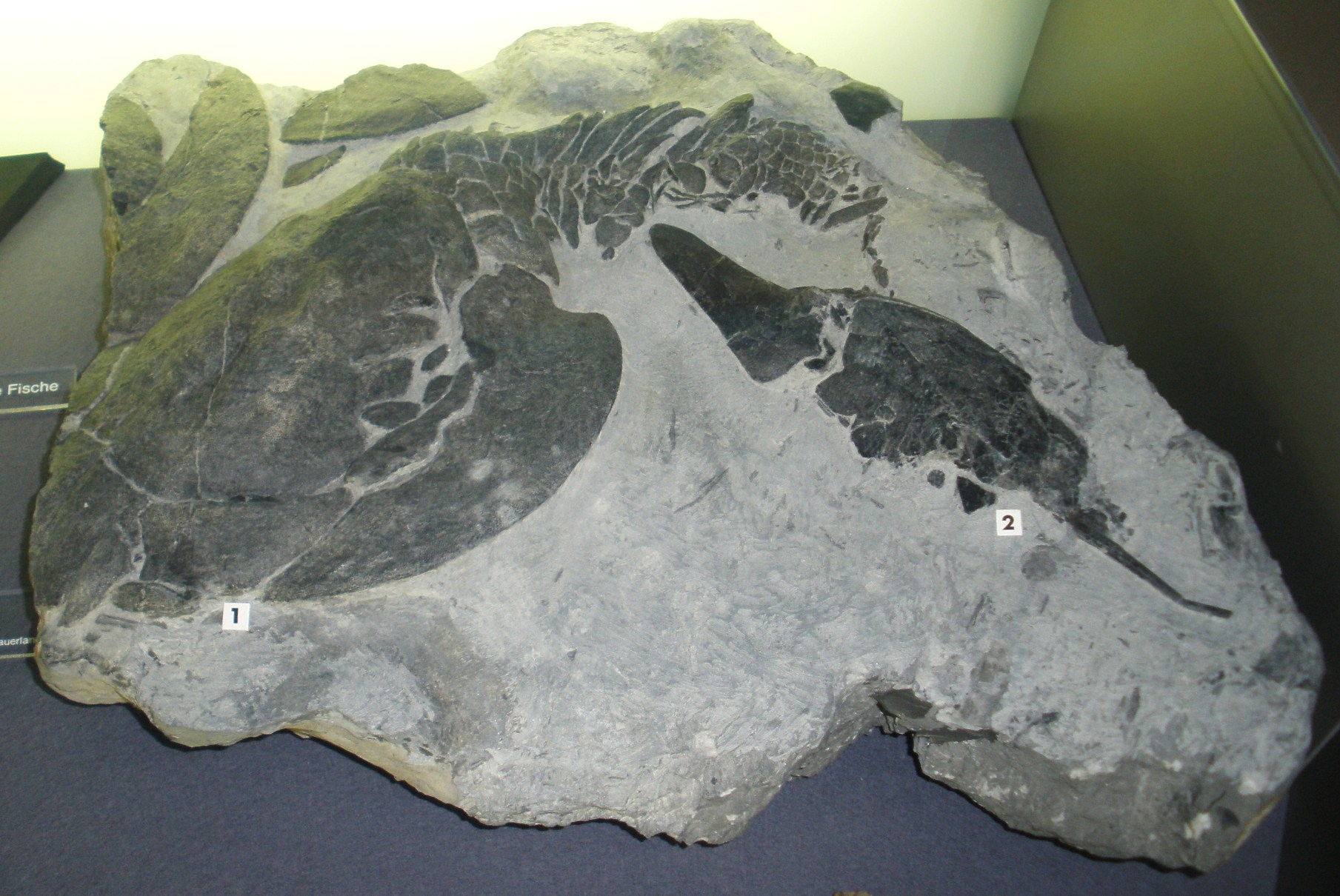
- Fossil specimens of Drepanaspis (left), a psammosteid, and Pteraspis (right), a pteraspid

Scientific classification
- Kingdom: Animalia
- Phylum: Chordata
- Infraphylum: Agnatha
- Class: †Pteraspidomorpha
- Subclass: †Heterostraci
- Order: †Pteraspidiformes; Berg 1940

Suborders and families
- Anchipteraspididae; Podolaspididae; Protopteraspididae; Psammosteida; Drepanaspididae; Guerichosteidae; Obrucheviidae; Psammolepididae; Psammosteidae; Pycnosteidae; Pteraspidoidei; Gigantaspididae; Larnovaspididae; Pteraspididae; Protaspididae; Rhinopteraspididae; Skalviaspididae

= Pteraspidiformes =

Pteraspidiformes Temporal range: Upper Silurian-Devonian

Extinct order of jawless fishes

Pteraspidiformes is an extinct order of heterostracan agnathan vertebrates known from extensive fossil remains primarily from Early Devonian strata of Europe and North America, and from Upper Silurian Canada.

== Anatomy ==
Fossil specimen of Errivaspis wayensis (NHMUK PV P 16789)

A pteraspidiform heterostracan has the cephalothorax enclosed in armor, formed from several plates, including dorsal, ventral, rostral, pineal plates, a dorsal spine derived from a scale, and a large, scale-covered tail. Many genera were benthic, others were apparently active swimming nekton. Delicate, finger-like components of the anterior end of the ventral plate forming the edges of the mouth suggest that pteraspidiform heterostracans were filter-feeders that selectively filtered specific sized plankton from the water column.

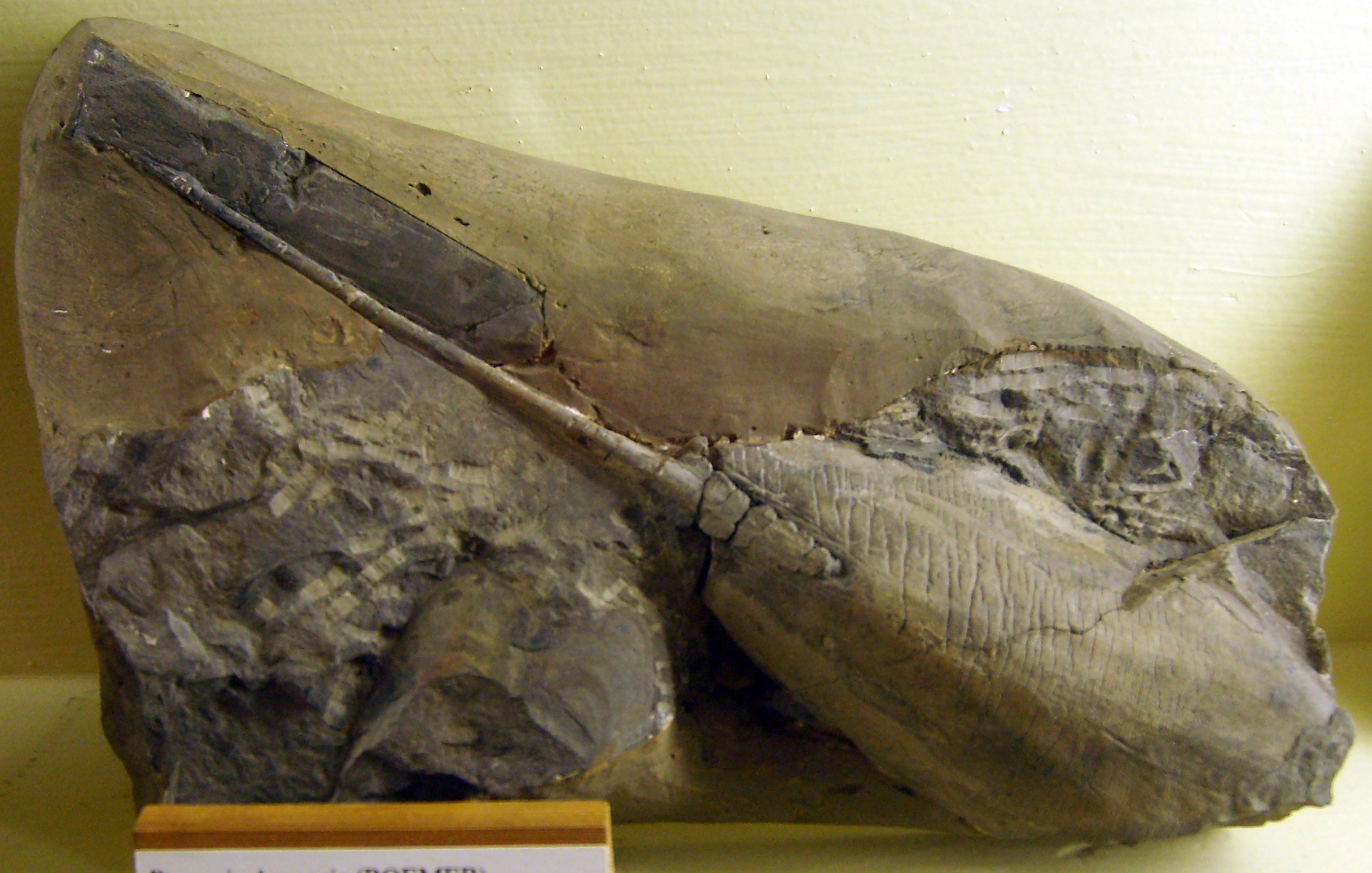
Fossil specimen of Rhinopteraspis

== Taxa ==
=== Anchipteraspididae ===
If Weigeltaspis is not a psammosteid pteraspidid, then the Anchipteraspidids are the oldest-most known pteraspidid heterostracans, with three genera from Pridolian-aged strata from Upper Silurian Canada. The armor of anchipteraspidids superficially resemble those of cyathaspidids, though, anchipteraspidids already have the typical series of plates diagnostic of pteraspidids, and the growth habits of anchipteraspidids are diagnostic of pteraspidids, and not of cyathaspidids.

=== Psammosteoidei ===
The psammosteids are a group of pteraspidiforms that forms the sister taxon of Protopteraspididae and Pteraspidoidei, and are sometimes treated as a suborder, "Psammosteoidei", or as an order-level taxon as "Psammosteida", or as a family, "Psammosteidae". Anatomically, a typical psammosteid resembles a typical pteraspidid that has had the forebody greatly dorsoventrally depressed, with a long, compressed tail. Some psammosteids, like Pycnosteus, have the ventral shield modified into a pedestal-like structure that some researchers compare to a sled's runner. The psammosteids are the only heterostracans to survive beyond the Middle Devonian, as the last genera became extinct during the Late Devonian Kellwasser event). The Late Silurian-Early Devonian genus Weigeltaspis may or may not belong to this group; species of this genus superficially resemble a small, elongated psammosteid.

=== "Protopteraspididae" ===
Protopteraspididae was once thought to be a family of primitive or basal pteraspidids. A recent analysis of Pteraspidiformes shows that Protopteraspididae is paraphyletic, as its various taxa show a gradual transition from primitive taxa similar to the Anchipteraspidids towards more derived taxa (such as Panamintaspis) closer to the Pteraspidoidei.

=== Pteraspidoidei ===
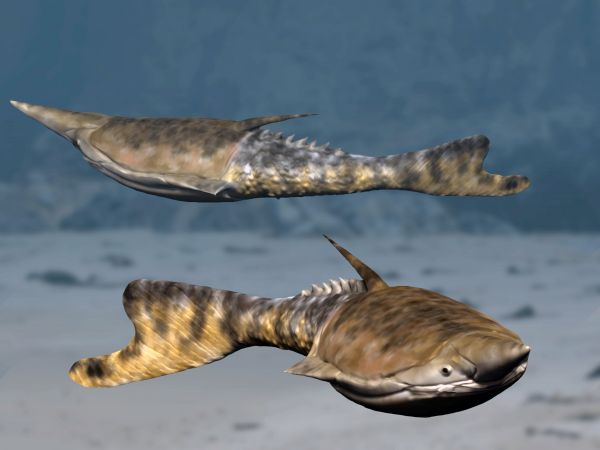
Restoration of Larnovaspis

Pteraspidoidei contains the more derived taxa within Pteraspidiformes, though, some protopteraspidids, such as Doryaspis and Panamintaspis, share various features with these derived pteraspidids.

==== Pteraspididae ====
Pteraspididae is an Early Devonian-aged family that contains the stereotypical, torpedo-shaped pteraspidids, such as the type genus, Pteraspis, and its close relatives Errivaspis and Rhinopteraspis, that are popularly thought to have actively swam about in the water column. The elongated rostral plate is thought to help with their hydrodynamic ability. Various genera are found in various marine and estuarine strata of Early Devonian Europe and North America.

==== Gigantaspididae ====
Gigantaspididae is a monogeneric family that was erected for Gigantaspis, a genus of pteraspidids restricted to the Early Devonian marine strata of Svalbard. Species of Gigantaspis superficially resemble some genera of its sister taxon, Protaspididae, i.e., that they had armor shaped like a hot bun or a round loaf of bread.

==== Protaspididae ====
Protaspididae is a family of bun or bread loaf-shaped pteraspidids found in Early Devonian marine strata from the Rocky Mountains of the United States, and of Europe. Some genera, such as Xylaspis and Woodfjordaspis, are similar in form to Gigantaspis, while others, such as Protaspis and Tuberculaspis, have armor that is more mound-shaped, or Psephaspis, a very compressed form that was originally described as a psammosteid closely related to Drepanaspis.
