= Šilalė Event =

The Šilalė Event was an extinction event affecting conodonts during the Přídolí, the final stage of the Silurian period.

== Timing ==
The Šilalė Event, first identified in the Milaičiai-103 core in southwestern Lithuania, is marked by a negative carbon isotope excursion in carbonate rocks known as the Šilalė Negative Carbon Isotope Event. This isotopic excursion is also known from the Jočionys-299 borehole in eastern Lithuania, as well as in coeval deposits in the Appalachian Basin of North America and has also been termed the Šilalė Low. The amplitudes of the ~405 Ka long eccentricity cycle were at their lowest point of the entire Přídolí during the Šilalė Event. The end of the Šilalė Event corresponds to the beginning of the Delotaxis detorta conodont biozone, a conodont biozone once erroneously thought to have corresponded to the latest Přídolí.

== Effects ==
The Šilalė Event resulted in a decline in conodont diversity and a corresponding increase not just in the diversity of brachiopods but in their absolute abundance as well. After the event, conodont abundance surged during the interval of biotic recovery from the Šilalė mass rarity.

== See also ==
- Dasberg Event – Minor extinction event in the Devonian period
- Hangenberg Event – Mass extinction at the end of the Devonian
- Ireviken Event – First of three relatively minor extinction events during the Silurian period
- Kellwasser Event – Second of the big five mass extinctions
- Lau Event – Relatively minor mass extinction during the Silurian period
- Lundgreni Event – Extinction event during the middle Homerian age of the Silurian period
- Mulde Event – Anoxic event causing mass extinctions during the Silurian period
