= Silurian-Devonian Terrestrial Revolution =

Period of rapid plant and fungal diversification, 428–359 million years ago

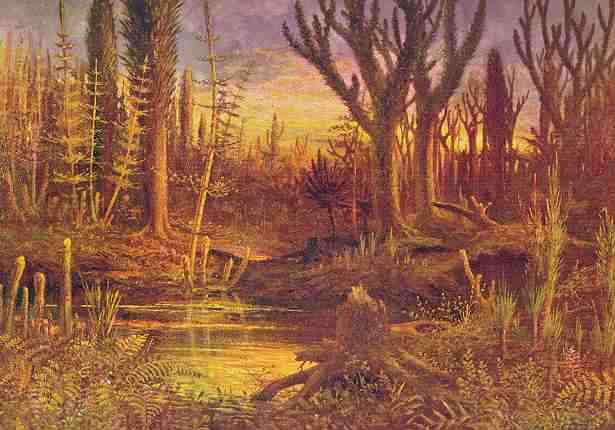
Artist interpretation of a Devonian swamp forest scene. Artwork by Eduard Riou from The World Before the Deluge 1872

The Silurian-Devonian Terrestrial Revolution (SDTR), also known as the Devonian Plant Explosion (DePE) and the Devonian explosion, was a period of rapid colonization, diversification and radiation of land plants (particularly vascular plants) and fungi (especially dikaryans) on dry lands that occurred 428 to 359 million years ago (Mya) during the Silurian and Devonian periods, with the most critical phase occurring during the Late Silurian and Early Devonian.

This diversification of terrestrial photosynthetic florae had vast impacts on the biotic composition of the Earth's surface, especially upon the Earth's atmosphere by oxygenation and carbon fixation. Their roots also eroded into the rocks, creating a layer of water-holding and mineral/organic matter-rich soil on top of Earth's crust known as the pedosphere, and significantly altering the chemistry of Earth's lithosphere and hydrosphere. The floral activities following the Silurian-Devonian plant revolution also exerted significant influences on changes in the water cycle and global climate, as well as driving the biosphere by creating diverse layers of vegetations that provide both sustenance and refuge for both upland and wetland habitats, paving the way for all terrestrial and aquatic biomes that would follow.

Through fierce competition for sunlight, soil nutrients and available land space, phenotypic diversity of plants increased greatly during the Silurian and Devonian periods, comparable in scale and effect to the explosion in diversity of animal life during the Cambrian explosion, especially in vertical growth of lignified vascular plants, which allowed for expansive canopies to develop, and forever altering the plant evolutions that followed. As plants evolved and radiated, so did arthropods, who became the first established terrestrial animals and some formed symbiotic coevolution with plants. Herbivory, granivory and detritivory subsequently evolved independently among terrestrial arthropods (especially hexapods such as insects, as well as myriapods), molluscs (land snails and slugs) and tetrapod vertebrates, causing plants to in turn develop defenses against foraging by animals.

The Silurian and Devonian terrestrial florae were largely spore-bearing plants (lycophytes and ferns) and significantly different in appearance, anatomy and reproductive strategies to most modern florae, which are dominated by fleshy seed-bearing angiosperms (flowering plants) that evolved much later during the Mesozoic. Much of these Silurian-Devonian florae had died out in extinction events including the Kellwasser event, the Hangenberg event, the Carboniferous rainforest collapse and the End-Permian extinction.

== Silurian and Devonian life ==
Rather than plants, it was fungi, in particular nematophytes such as Prototaxites, that dominated the early stages of this terrestrial biodiversification event. Nematophytes towered over even the largest land plants during the Silurian and Early Devonian, only being truly surpassed in size in the Early Carboniferous. The nutrient-distributing glomeromycotan mycorrhizal networks of nematophytes were very likely to have acted as facilitators for the expansion of plants into terrestrial environments, which followed the colonising fungi. However, recent research suggests that Prototaxites may not have been a fungus after all but part of a completely different clade of eukaryotes. The first fossils of arbuscular mycorrhizae, a type of symbiosis between fungi and vascular plants, are known from the Early Devonian. Lichens such as Spongiophyton were widespread and had outsized ecological prominence during the Early Devonian, just before the development of forests.

Land plants probably evolved in the Ordovician. The earliest radiations of the first land plants, also known as embryophytes, were bryophytes, which began to transform terrestrial environments and the global climate in the Ordovician. Baltica was a particularly important cradle for early land plant evolution, with it having a diverse flora by the Darriwilian. ∆^{199}Hg and ∆^{200}Hg excursions reveal that land plants had already spread across much of the Earth's land surface by the Early Silurian. The end of the Homerian glaciation, a glacial phase of the Early Palaeozoic Ice Age, and the corresponding period of global warming marked the first major diversification of plants that produced trilete spores. The later glaciation during the middle Ludfordian, corresponding to the Lau event, led to a major marine regression, creating significant areas of new dry land habitat that were colonised by plants, along with cyanobacterial mats. These newly created terrestrial habitats helped facilitate the global expansion and evolutionary radiation of polysporangiophytes. A warming climate during the subsequent Pridoli epoch lent itself to further floral diversification. During the Wenlock epoch of the Silurian, the first fossils of vascular plants appear in the fossil record in the form of sporophytes of polysporangiophytes. Lycophytes first appeared during the later Ludlow epoch in the form of Baragwanathia, which was an aquatic predecessor of fully terrestrialised lycophytes. Palynological evidence points to Silurian terrestrial floras exhibiting little provincialism relative to present day floras that vary significantly by region, instead being broadly similar across the globe. Plant diversification in the Silurian was aided by the presence of numerous small, rapidly changing volcanic islands in the Rheic Ocean that acted as natural laboratories accelerating evolutionary changes and enabling distinct, endemic floral lineages to arise. Silurian plants rarely reached large sizes, with heights of 13 cm, achieved by Tichavekia grandis, being exceptionally large for the time.

The Devonian witnessed the widespread greening of the Earth's surface, with many modern vascular plant clades originating during this period. Basal members of Euphyllophytina, the clade that includes trimerophytes, ferns, progymnosperms, and seed plants, are known from Early Devonian fossils. Lycopsids experienced their first evolutionary radiation during the Devonian period. Early Devonian plant communities were generally similar regardless of what landmass they inhabited, although zosterophyllopsids displayed high levels of endemism.

In the Middle Devonian, euphyllophytes continued to increase in diversity. The first true forest environments featuring trees exceeding eight metres in height emerged by the Middle Devonian, with the earliest known fossil forest dating to the Eifelian. The oldest known trees were members of the clade Cladoxylopsida. Devonian swamp forests were dominated by giant horsetails (Equisetales), clubmosses, ancestral ferns (pteridophytes), and large lycophyte vascular plants such as Lepidodendrales, referred to as scale trees for the appearance of scales on their photosynthetic trunks. These lycophytes, which could grow up to 40 metres high, grew in great numbers around swamps along with tracheophytes. Seed ferns and true leaf-bearing plants such as progymnosperms also appeared at this time and became dominant in many habitats, particularly archeopteridaleans, which were likely related to conifers. Pseudosporochnaleans (morphologically similar to palms and tree ferns) likewise experienced a similar rise to dominance. Archeopteridaleans had likely developed extensive root systems, making them resistant to drought, and meaning they had a more significant impact on Devonian soil environments than pseudosporochnaleans.

The Late Devonian saw the most rapid land plant diversification of the Devonian, largely owing to the rapid radiation of pteridophytes and progymnosperms. Cladoxylopsids continued to dominate forest ecosystems during the early Late Devonian. Lycophytes became a dominant component of the flora during the Late Devonian. During the latest Devonian, the first true spermatophytes appeared, evolving as a sister group to archaeopteridaleans or to progymnosperms as a whole. This epoch was characterised by a trend of floral homogenisation, with exchanges between regions such as South China and Gondwana contributing to a high degree of uniformity of plant communities.

Most flora in Devonian coal swamps would have seemed alien in appearance when compared with modern flora, such as giant horsetails which could grow up to 30 m in height. Devonian ancestral plants of modern plants that may have been very similar in appearance are ferns (Polypodiopsida), although many of them are thought to have been epiphytes rather than grounded plants. True gymnosperms like ginkgos (Ginkgophyta) and cycads (Cycadophyta) would appear slightly after the Devonian in the Carboniferous.

Vascular plant lineages of sphenoids, fern, progymnosperms, and seed plants evolved laminated leaves during the Devonian. Plants that possessed true leaves appeared during the Devonian, though they may have many independent origins with parallel trajectories of leaf morphologies. Morphological evidence to support this diversification theory appears in the Late Devonian or Early Carboniferous when compared with modern leaf morphologies. The marginal meristem also evolved in a parallel fashion through a similar process of modified structures around this time period. In a 1994 study by Richard M Bateman and William A. Dimechele of the evolutionary history of heterospory in the plant kingdom, researchers found evidence of 11 origins of heterospory events that had occurred independently in the Devonian within Zosterophyllopsida, Sphenopsida, Progymnospermopsida. The effect of this heterospory was that it presented a primary evolutionary advantage for these plants in colonising land. Early land plants had conducting systems consisting of a single type of cell able to transport solutes and water alike. The simultaneous colonisation of dry land and increase in plant body size that many lineages underwent during this time was likely facilitated by another parallel development: the replacement of the ancestral central cylinder of xylem with more elongate, complex xylem strand shapes that would have made the plant body more resistant to the spread of drought-induced embolism. Early vascular thickenings, based on analysis of the Rhynie Chert flora, appear to have been unlignified. Tracheids, tapered cells that make up the xylem of vascular plants, first appear in the fossil record during the Early Devonian. Woody stems evolved during the Devonian as well, with the first evidence of them dating back to the Early Devonian. Evidence of root structures appears for the first time during the Late Silurian. Further appearances of roots in the fossil record are found in Early Devonian lycophytes, and it has been suggested that the development of roots was an adaptation for maximising water acquisition in response to the increase in aridity over the course of the Silurian and Devonian. The Early Devonian also saw the appearance of complex subterranean rhizome networks.

== Environmental impact ==
=== Effects on soil ===
Early non-vascular plants that began colonizing land during the Ordovician and early Silurian had limited bioengineering effects due to the lack of deep roots that could break up solid rocks into regolith and soil. Deep-rooted vascular plants, on the other hand, had drastic erosional impacts upon the lithosphere. The symbiotic relationship between vascular plant root systems and various symbiont microbiomes evolved into mutualistic communities called rhizosphere, which synergistically further enhanced the weathering of the lithosphere into the pedosphere and increased release of essential minerals such as phosphates, calcium and magnesium.

The Devonian Plant Hypothesis is an explanation about these effects upon biogeomorphic ecosystems of climate and marine environments. Expansion of terrestrial Devonian flora modified soil properties, increasing silicate weathering by way of rhizosphere development as evidenced by pedogenic carbonates. Deep rooted trees in particular are hypothesised to have greatly enhanced the silicate weathering cycle.

=== Effects on atmosphere and climate ===
A climate/carbon/vegetation model could explain the effects of plant colonization during the Devonian. Enhanced silicate weathering caused atmospheric CO_{2} levels to fall from around 6300 to 2100 ppmv, although it also drastically reduced the albedo of much of Earth's land surface, retarding the cooling effects of this greenhouse gas drawdown. The biological sequestration of so much atmospheric carbon dioxide resulted in the beginning of the Late Paleozoic icehouse at the end of the Devonian, together with the tectonic uplift of the continent Gondwana. However, an alternative hypothesis holds that land plant evolution actually decreased silicate weathering rates, instead causing a drop in atmospheric carbon dioxide levels through elevated organic carbon burial brought about by the formation of wetlands. Some palaeoclimatic simulations have found that depending on the circumstances, the spread of plants could temporarily increase pCO_{2} by promoting regolith growth that would hinder the ability of water containing dissolved carbon dioxide to percolate into bedrock.

There was a well-defined, stepwise transition of Earth's atmosphere during the mid-Paleozoic from an atmosphere with relatively low oxygen to one with abundant oxygen, which fundamentally changed the geologic oxygen cycle. Atmospheric O_{2} concentration oscillated between about 2% and 11% atm during the Cambrian to mid-Ordovician and around 13% atm during early Silurian, but rose to near modern-day levels (1 atm, about 21% mole fraction) in the Devonian and subsequently to a peak of over 1.6 atm (around 35% mole fraction) during the late Carboniferous and most of the Permian periods. This significant oxygen rise, known as the Paleozoic Oxygenation Event (POE), coincided with and was likely a direct result of the advent of terrestrial vascular plant expansion, since terrestrial florae get more direct sunlight (without the reflective and attenuative losses through water) and higher concentration of free carbon dioxide (around 400 ppm in current atmosphere vs. around 10 ppm in most surface waters) than aquatic florae.

With increased atmospheric oxygenation also came increased spontaneous wildfires, and the Earth's atmosphere first became sufficiently high in oxygen to produce wildfires during the Pridoli, when the first charcoal evidence of wildfires is recorded. For most of the Early and Middle Devonian, the atmosphere was insufficiently oxygenated to enable significant fire activity. By the late Famennian, however, oxygen levels were high enough to enable wildfires to occur with regularity and on large scales, something which had not been previously possible due to the paucity of atmospheric oxygen.

=== Effects on ecosystems ===
The rise of wetlands and swamp forests caused greater amounts of fine sediment particles to be retained on alluvial plains, increasing the complexity of meandering and braided fluvial systems. The accumulated plant litters below the trees and also formed a layer of detritus covering the soil, providing both a source of nutrition and shelter for various organisms. The greater complexity of terrestrial habitats facilitated the colonisation of the land by early terrestrial animals, then mainly arthropods such as arachnids, myriapods and possibly hexapods. Additionally, the increased erosive weathering of the lithosphere by plant roots, the subsequent release of minerals such as phosphates, and the quantity of terrestrial humic matter washed down by surface runoffs led to increased nutrient levels in freshwater lakes, rivers and ponds, and subsequently in estuaries and shallow seas. Such eutrophication facilitated the proliferation of freshwater planktons and subsequently promoted the presence of planktivores and in turn predatory carnivores, among them eurypterids and nektonic vertebrates (i.e. fish). From these inland waterbodies, some riparian vertebrates, particularly stegocephalian lobe-finned fish, would later evolve into semiaquatic, air-breathing amphibian tetrapods who began to colonize the land.

Soon after the evolution of land plants evolved mutualistic animals assisting them in reproducing and dispersing; the first evidence of palynivory dates back to the Late Silurian and Early Devonian in the form of coprolites, likely produced by hexapods, containing plant spores, suggesting that hexapods and other arthropods may have facilitated the colonisation of the land by land plants.

The Devonian Plant Explosion had global consequences on oceanic nutrient content and sediment cycling, which likely had led to harmful plankton blooms and consequently the Late Devonian extinction of the freshwater and marine ecosystems. The expansion of trees in the Late Devonian drastically increased biological weathering rates and the consequent riverine input of nutrients into the ocean. The altering of soil composition created anoxic sedimentation (or black shales), oceanic acidification, and global climate changes. This led to harsh living conditions for oceanic and terrestrial life.

The significant increase in woody organic matter accumulated in swamplands explains the massive deposits of coal that would later characterize the Carboniferous. As xylophages and wood-decay fungi capable of breaking down lignin would not be evolved until the Late Permian and Late Carboniferous, respectively, most herbivores then were folivores or detritivores who could only digest the softer, herbaceous components of the terrestrial florae, leaving large quantities of woody peat buried under sediments as carbon sinks. This phenomenon would continue and intensify into the Carboniferous, where large swathes of swamp forests expanded further inland forming so-called coal forest, and did not stop until the rainforest collapse at the end of the Carboniferous.
