= Ludlow Epoch =

3rd series of the Silurian

Ludlow
- 426.7 ± 1.5 – 422.7 ± 1.6 Ma
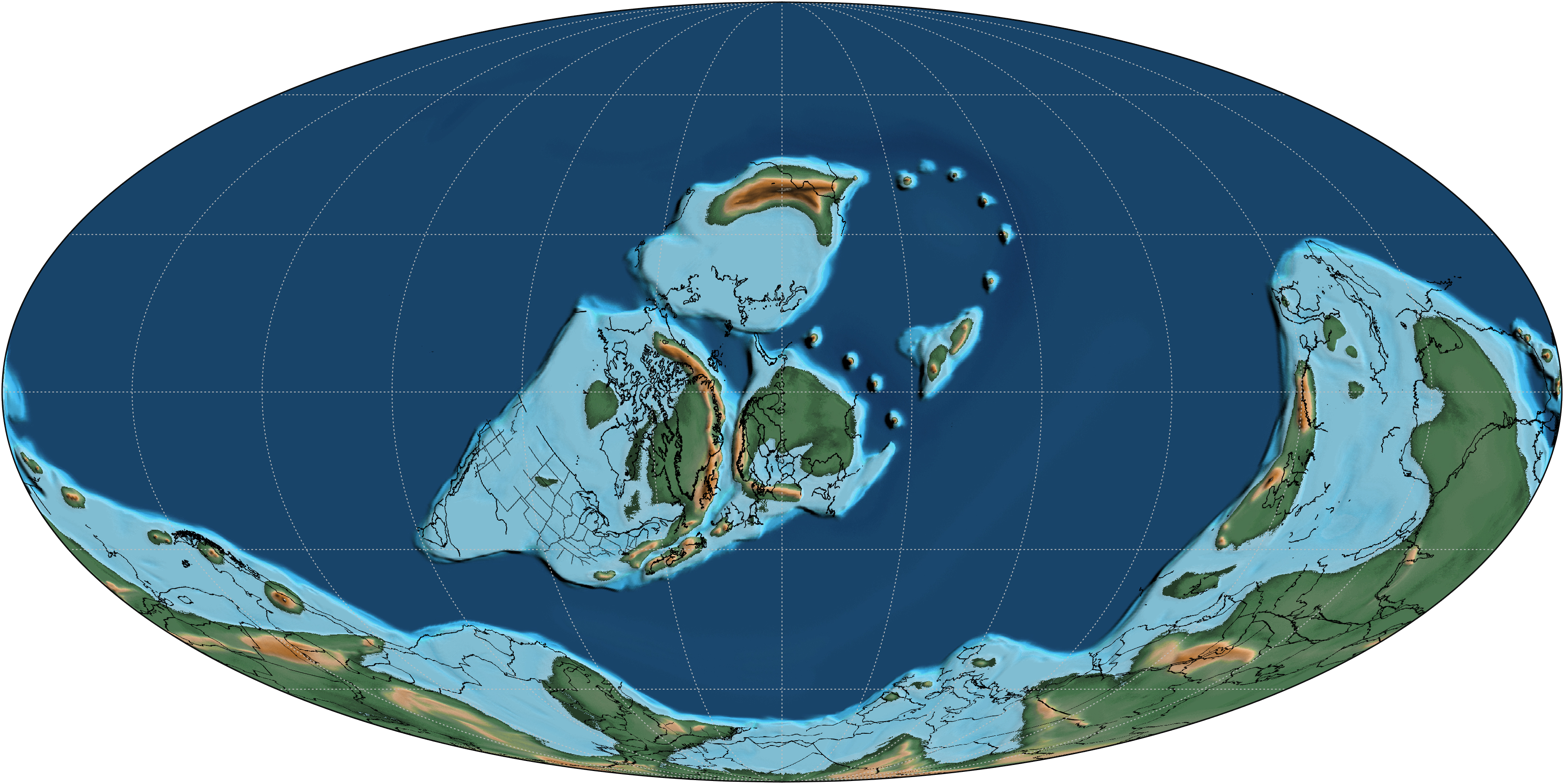
- A map of Earth as it appeared 425 million years ago during the Ludlow Epoch, Ludfordian Age

Chronology
← / Lau event; ← / Mulde event; ← / Ireviken event
Subdivision of the Silurian according to the ICS, as of 2024. Vertical axis scale: Millions of years ago

Etymology
- Name formality: Formal
- Name ratified: 1980

Usage information
- Celestial body: Earth
- Regional usage: Global (ICS)
- Time scale(s) used: ICS Time Scale

Definition
- Chronological unit: Epoch
- Stratigraphic unit: Series
- Time span formality: Formal
- Lower boundary definition: FAD of the Graptolite Saetograptus (Colonograptus) varians
- Lower boundary GSSP: Pitch Coppice, Ludlow, U.K. 52.3592°N 2.7772°W
- Lower GSSP ratified: 1980
- Upper boundary definition: FAD of the Graptolite Monograptus parultimus.
- Upper boundary GSSP: Požáry Section, Prague-Řeporyje, Czech Republic; 50.0277°N 14.3249°E
- Upper GSSP ratified: 1984

In the geological timescale, the Ludlow Epoch or Mid-Late Silurian (from 426.7 ± 1.5 million years ago to 422.7 ± 1.6 million years ago) occurred during the Silurian Period, after the end of the Homerian Age. It is named for the town of Ludlow in Shropshire, England.

The Ludlow Epoch is subdivided into two stages: Gorstian and Ludfordian.

== See also ==
- Ludlow Group
