= Telychian =

Third stage of the Silurian and last stage of the Llandovery

- 438.6 ± 1.0 – 432.9 ± 1.2 Ma
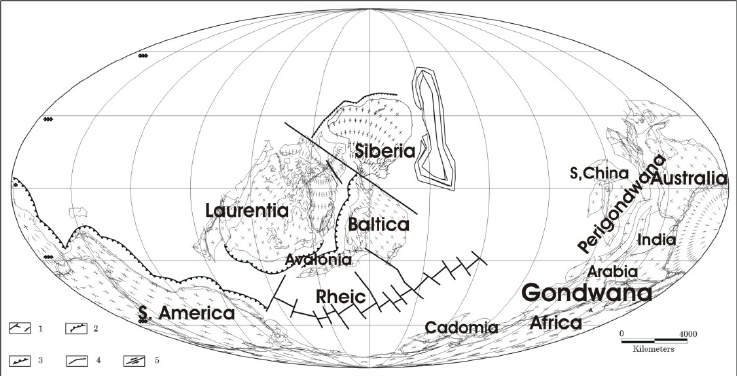
- Paleogeography of the Telychian, 435 Ma

Chronology
← / Lau event; ← / Mulde event; ← / Ireviken event
Subdivision of the Silurian according to the ICS, as of 2023. Vertical axis scale: Millions of years ago

Etymology
- Name formality: Formal

Usage information
- Celestial body: Earth
- Regional usage: Global (ICS)
- Time scale(s) used: ICS Time Scale

Definition
- Chronological unit: Age
- Stratigraphic unit: Stage
- Time span formality: Formal
- Lower boundary definition: FAD of the graptolite Spirograptus guerichi
- Lower boundary GSSP: El Pintado section, Seville, Spain; 37.9853°N 5.9285°W
- Lower GSSP ratified: 2024
- Upper boundary definition: Imprecise. Currently placed between acritarch biozone 5 and LAD of Pterospathodus amorphognathoides. See Llandovery for more info.
- Upper boundary definition candidates: A conodont boundary (Ireviken datum 2) which is close to the murchisoni graptolite biozone.
- Upper boundary GSSP candidate section(s): None
- Upper boundary GSSP: Hughley Brook, Apedale, UK; 52.5811°N 2.6389°W
- Upper GSSP ratified: 1980

In the geologic timescale, the Telychian is the third and final age of the Llandovery Epoch of the Silurian Period of the Paleozoic Era of the Phanerozoic Eon. The Telychian Age was between 438.6 ± 1.0 million years ago (Ma) and 432.9 ± 1.2 Ma. The Telychian Age succeeds the Aeronian Age and precedes the Sheinwoodian Age. The name of the interval is derived from the Pen-lan-Telych Farm near Llandovery, Powys, Wales.

It ended with the Ireviken event.

== Ireviken event ==
The Ireviken event was the first of three relatively minor extinction events (the Ireviken, Mulde, and Lau events) during the Silurian Period. It occurred at the Llandovery/Wenlock boundary (mid Silurian, 432.9 ± 1.2 million years ago). The event is best recorded at Ireviken, Gotland, where over 50% of trilobite species became extinct; 80% of the global conodont species also become extinct in this interval.
