= Dasberg Event =

Minor extinction event in the Devonian period

The Dasberg Event was a minor extinction event that occurred during the Famennian, the final stage of the Devonian period. It is often considered to be one of the events contributing to the Late Devonian extinction, which is believed by many palaeontologists to have been a protracted event that took place over millions of years.

== Timing ==
The Dasberg Event occurred during the late Famennian in the Palmatolepis gracilis expansa conodont biozone, near the boundary between the lower and middle parts of the expansa biozone.

== Causes ==
Anoxia has been implicated as the main cause of the Dasberg Event. In the deep-shelf Kowala site in the Holy Cross Mountains of Poland, possible evidence of either intermittent anoxia throughout the water column or of prevalent anoxia in surficial waters concurrent with oxygenated bottom water in the lower Dasberg shale comes from low ratios of uranium to thorium, the dominance of small framboids combined with the presence of large framboids, and the presence of green sulphur bacterial biosignatures. No evidence of anoxia exists in the sedimentary layers sandwiched in between the lower and upper Dasberg shale layers. During the deposition of the upper Dasberg shale, both bottom waters and the water column were anoxic. Both of the two intervals of anoxia are linked to marine transgressions and microbial blooms of primary producers.

Volcanic activity from the Yakutsk-Vilyuy Large Igneous Province or the Kola-Dnieper Large Igneous Province has been put forward as an explanation for the occurrence of anoxia. Pulses of activity from these large igneous provinces have been suggested as causes for other Late Devonian biotic crises. However, this association is highly tentative, as there exist no estimates precise enough for the timing of these pulses to conclusively prove their responsibility for causing the Dasberg Event.

== Effects ==
The Dasberg Event caused the extinction of many pelagic species, particularly ammonoids. One of its other consequences was the appearance of the Etroeungt fauna, an unusual faunal assemblage consisting of very large brachiopods and solitary rugose corals; this short-lived fauna died out a few million years later in the much more severe Hangenberg Event.

This event, like many anoxic events, resulted in the widespread deposition of black shales. In addition to black shales, widespread organic-rich limestones were also deposited during the event.

== See also ==
- Ireviken Event
- Lundgreni Event
- Mulde Event
- Lau Event
- Kellwasser Event
- Hangenberg Event
