= Gorstian =

Sixth stage of the Silurian

- 426.7 ± 1.5 – 425.0 ± 1.5 Ma
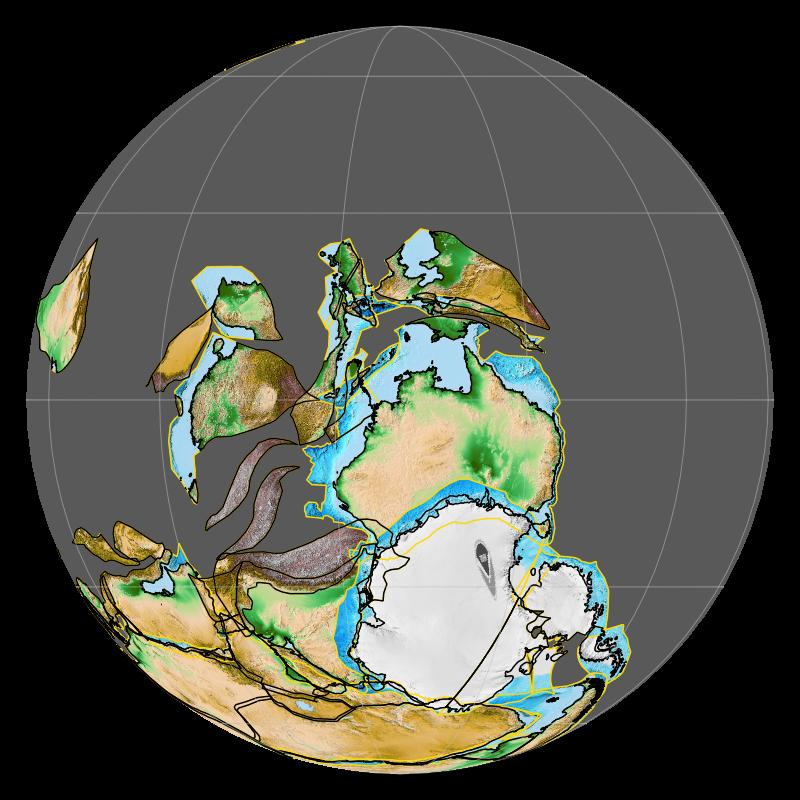
- Paleogeography of the late Gorstian, 425 Ma

Chronology
← / Lau event; ← / Mulde event; ← / Ireviken event
Subdivision of the Silurian according to the ICS, as of 2023. Vertical axis scale: Millions of years ago

Etymology
- Name formality: Formal
- Name ratified: 1980

Usage information
- Celestial body: Earth
- Regional usage: Global (ICS)
- Time scale(s) used: ICS Time Scale

Definition
- Chronological unit: Age
- Stratigraphic unit: Stage
- Time span formality: Formal
- Lower boundary definition: FAD of the graptolite Saetograptus (Colonograptus) varians
- Lower boundary GSSP: Pitch Coppice, Ludlow, U.K. 52.3592°N 2.7772°W
- Lower GSSP ratified: 1980
- Upper boundary definition: Imprecise. Near FAD of the graptolite Saetograptus leintwardinensis
- Upper boundary definition candidates: None
- Upper boundary GSSP candidate section(s): None
- Upper boundary GSSP: Sunnyhill, Ludlow, England; 52.3592°N 2.7772°W
- Upper GSSP ratified: 1980

In the geologic timescale, the Gorstian is an age of the Ludlow Epoch of the Silurian Period of the Paleozoic Era of the Phanerozoic Eon that is comprehended between 426.7 ± 1.5 Ma and 425.0 ± 1.5 Ma (million years ago), approximately. The Gorstian Age succeeds the Homerian Age and precedes the Ludfordian Age. The age is named after Gorsty village southwest of Ludlow. The base of the age is marked by Saetograptus (Colonograptus) varians. The type section is located in a quarry in the Elton Formation at Pitch Coppice, Shropshire, United Kingdom.
