= Rhuddanian =

First stage of the Silurian

- 443.1 ± 0.9 – 440.5 ± 1.0 Ma

Chronology
← / Lau event; ← / Mulde event; ← / Ireviken event
Subdivision of the Silurian according to the ICS, as of 2023. Vertical axis scale: Millions of years ago

Etymology
- Name formality: Formal

Usage information
- Celestial body: Earth
- Regional usage: Global (ICS)
- Time scale(s) used: ICS Time Scale

Definition
- Chronological unit: Age
- Stratigraphic unit: Stage
- Time span formality: Formal
- Lower boundary definition: FAD of the graptolite Akidograptus ascensus
- Lower boundary GSSP: Dob's Linn, Moffat, U.K. 55.4400°N 3.2700°W
- Lower GSSP ratified: 1984
- Upper boundary definition: FAD of the graptolite Demirastrites triangulatus
- Upper boundary GSSP: Hlásná Třebaň section, Czech Republic; 49.9230°N 14.2119°E
- Upper GSSP ratified: 2024

In the geologic timescale, the Rhuddanian is the first age of the Silurian Period and of the Llandovery Epoch. The Silurian is in the Paleozoic Era of the Phanerozoic Eon. The Rhuddanian Age began 443.1 ± 0.9 Ma and ended 440.5 ± 1.0 Ma (million years ago). It succeeds the Hirnantian Age (the last age of the Ordovician Period) and precedes the Aeronian Age.

== GSSP ==
The GSSP for the Silurian is located in a section at Dob's Linn, Scotland, in an artificial excavation created just north of the Linn Branch Stream. Two lithological units (formations) occur near the boundary. The lower is the Hartfell Shale (48 metres (157 ft) thick), consisting chiefly of pale gray mudstone with subordinate black shales and several interbedded meta-bentonites. Above this is the 43 metres (141 ft) thick Birkhill Shale, which consist predominantly of black graptolitic shale with subordinate gray mudstones and meta-bentonites.

The name is given after Cefn-Rhuddan Farm, Llandovery in Carmarthenshire, Wales.

== See also ==
- Ordovician-Silurian extinction events
- Early Palaeozoic Icehouse
