= Lundgreni event =

Extinction event during the middle Homerian age of the Silurian period

The Lundgreni Event, also known as the Mid-Homerian Biotic Crisis, was an extinction event during the middle Homerian age of the Silurian period. Evidence for the event has been observed in Silurian marine deposits in the Iberian Peninsula, Bohemia, and Poland.

== Timing ==
In the Kosov quarry in Bohemia, the extinction is observed during the latest lundgreni biozone and over the course of the flemingii biozone interval. The following parvus biozone, corresponding to the nassa, the parvus-nassa, or dubious-nassa biozones in other localities, represents a post-extinction interval, which is in turn followed by the frequens, praedeubeli-deubeli, and ludensis-gerhardi biozones that mark the period of recovery from the extinction.

== Causes ==
Eutrophication and anoxia coeval with abrupt ecological changes have been implicated as extinction mechanisms bringing about the Lundgreni Event. Immediately after the extinction event, geological records from Bartoszyce evidence a sharp slowdown of ocean mixing. The Lundgreni Event has been hypothesised to have occurred during a period of global marine transgression, a proposed explanation cohering with the relative lack of effect this biotic crisis had on benthic fauna due to the fact that anoxia would likely not have spread into shallow, epicontinental seas.

== Isotopic effects ==
The extinction is marked by the start of a double-peaked positive carbon isotope excursion beginning in the lundgreni graptolite biozone. The first peak spans from the uppermost portion of the lundgreni biozone all the way to the praedeubeli-deubeli graptolite biozone, with a particularly sharp trend towards increasingly positive δ13C values observed during the flemingii and parvus graptolite biozones, corresponding to the extinction interval. The second peak’s start is close to the base of the ludensis-gerhardi graptolite biozone, during the recovery interval.

== Biotic effects ==
The crisis primarily affected graptolites, benthic organisms, and microphytoplankton.

Graptolite species richness reached a worldwide minimum during the extinction event. Cyrtograptids were rendered extinct by the event, while monograptids managed to survive. The genus Monograptus and the family Monoclimacidae were driven to near-extinction. The recovery of graptolites was dominated by retiolitids, and novel graptolite morphological innovations, such as hooded, hooked, lobate, and spinose thecal apertures, sicular cladia, and S-shaped rhabdosomes, have been documented to have evolved among graptolites during the adaptive radiation following the environmental perturbations of the Lundgreni Event.

In Bartoszyce, benthic faunas did not experience an extinction synchronous with the graptolite crisis, and experienced a spike in abundance during the post-extinction period believed to be related to the decline in eutrophication.

In Kosov, the benthic fauna of the lundgreni biozone, dominated by epibyssate cardiolid bivalves (Cardiola, Isiola) and rare reclining bivalves (Slava, Dualina), along with atrypid brachiopods and crinoids, was replaced with the Decoroproetus–Ravozetina fauna, dominated by trilobites, hyolithids, machaeridians, and the linguliform brachiopod Paterula during the parvus biozone.

Acritarchs and prasinophytes suffered no extinction during the crisis, although their relative frequencies and abundances did vary over the course of the extinction event as marine environments were perturbed.

Pelagic cephalopods, other than a drop in overall abundance, were unaffected by the biotic crisis, and saw no meaningful decrease in diversity.

== See also ==
- Ireviken event
- Mulde event
- Lau event
