= Přídolí Epoch =

Final Series (Epoch) of the Silurian

Přídolí
- 422.7 ± 1.6 – 419.62 ± 1.36 Ma
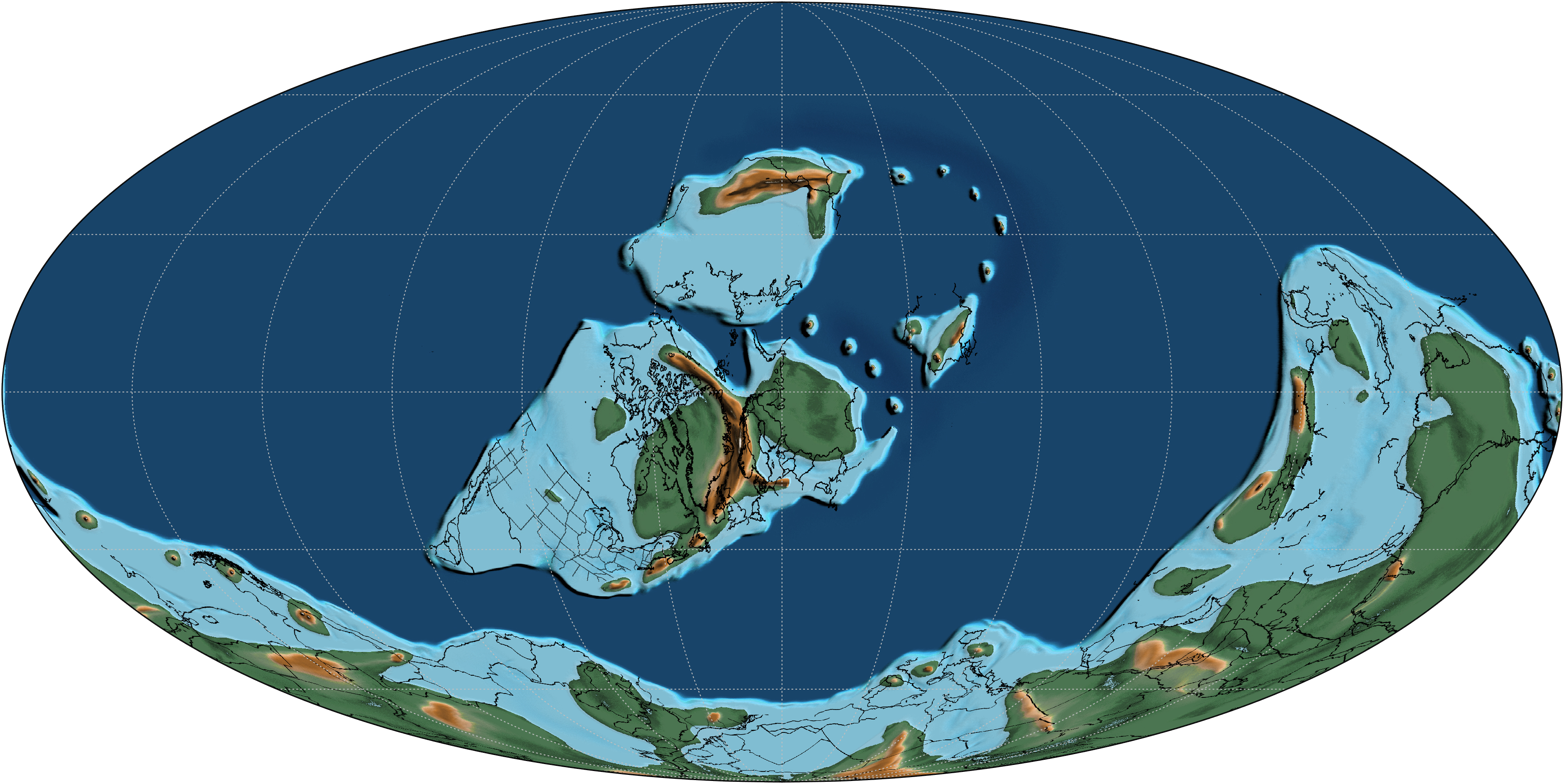
- A map of Earth as it appeared 420 million years ago during the Přídolí Epoch

Chronology
← / Lau event; ← / Mulde event; ← / Ireviken event
Subdivision of the Silurian according to the ICS, as of 2024. Vertical axis scale: Millions of years ago

Etymology
- Name formality: Formal
- Name ratified: 1984

Usage information
- Celestial body: Earth
- Regional usage: Global (ICS)
- Time scale(s) used: ICS Time Scale

Definition
- Chronological unit: Epoch
- Stratigraphic unit: Series
- Time span formality: Formal
- Lower boundary definition: FAD of the graptolite Monograptus parultimus
- Lower boundary GSSP: Požáry Section, Řeporyje District, Prague, Czech Republic; 50.0277°N 14.3249°E
- Lower GSSP ratified: 1984
- Upper boundary definition: FAD of the graptolite Monograptus uniformis
- Upper boundary GSSP: Klonk, Suchomasty, Czech Republic; 49.8550°N 13.7920°E
- Upper GSSP ratified: 1972

In the geologic timescale, the Přídolí Epoch (Czech pronunciation: [ˈpr̝̊iːdoliː]), sometimes spelled Pridoli Epoch in international sources, is the fourth and latest epoch of the Silurian Period, corresponding to the Přídolí Series, the uppermost subdivision of the Silurian System. It is dated at between 422.7 ± 1.6 and 419.62 ± 1.36 mya (million years ago). The Přídolí Epoch succeeds the Ludfordian age of the Ludlow epoch and precedes the Lochkovian, the earliest of three ages within the Early Devonian geological epoch. It is named after one locality at the Homolka a Přídolí nature reserve near the Prague suburb, Slivenec, in the Czech Republic. The GSSP is located within the Požáry Formation, overlying the Kopanina Formation. Přídolí is the old name of a cadastral field area.

The Šilalė Event, a negative carbon isotope excursion corresponding to an extinction event of conodonts, occurred during the early Přídolí.

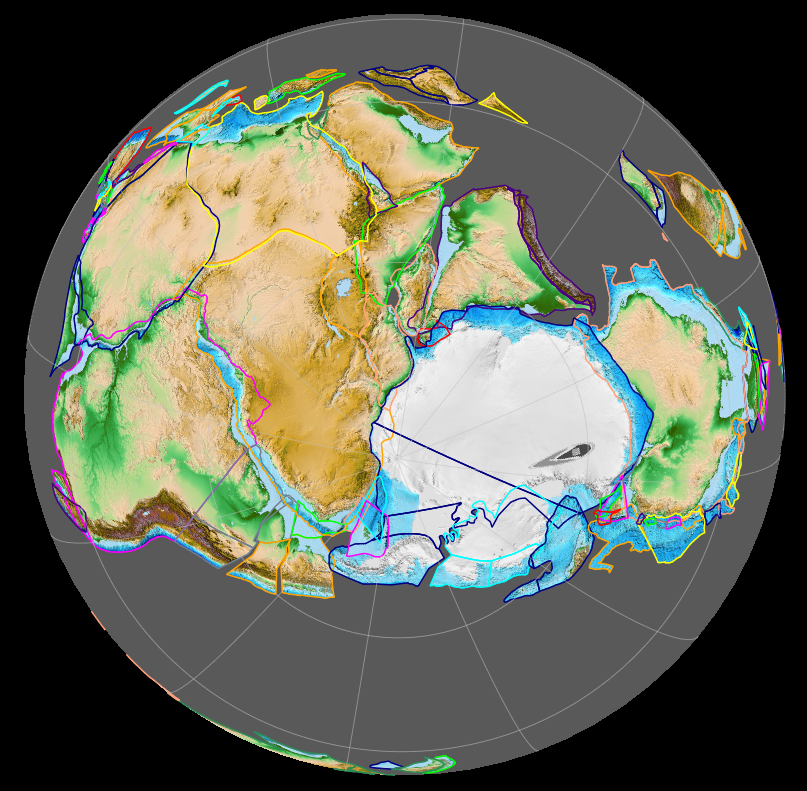
Gondwana during the Přídolí, 420 Ma

== Subdivisions ==
The Přídolí Series has not yet been divided into stages, but the Pridoli Working Group is developing its division into two stages. The boundary and markers of the lower stage, Jarovian, would completely coincide with those for the entire Přídolí. The second (upper) stage supposed to be named Radotinian by Czech researchers. The lower boundary of this stage is proposed to be determined by the FAD of the graptolite Wolynograptus bouceki, with the FADs of the cephalopod Kopaninoceras fluminese and the conodont Oulodus detortus as supporting markers. The Hvížďalka section is proposed as a stratotype of the Radotinian stage.
