= Ludfordian =

Seventh stage of the Silurian

- 425.0 ± 1.5 – 422.7 ± 1.6 Ma
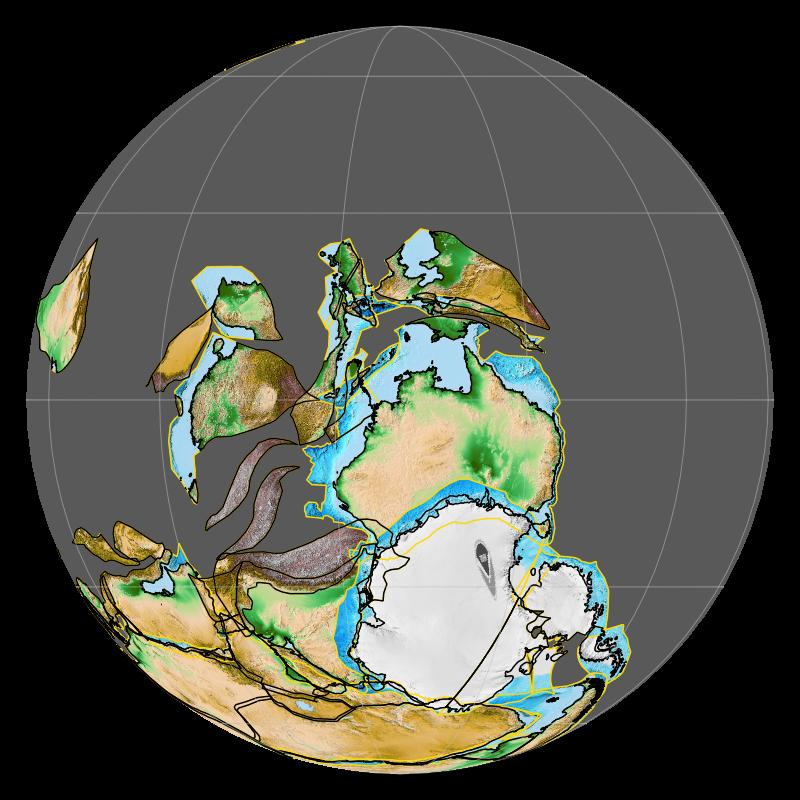
- Paleogeography of the Ludfordian, 425 Ma

Chronology
← / Lau event; ← / Mulde event; ← / Ireviken event
Subdivision of the Silurian according to the ICS, as of 2023. Vertical axis scale: Millions of years ago

Etymology
- Name formality: Formal
- Name ratified: 1980

Usage information
- Celestial body: Earth
- Regional usage: Global (ICS)
- Time scale(s) used: ICS Time Scale

Definition
- Chronological unit: Age
- Stratigraphic unit: Stage
- Time span formality: Formal
- Lower boundary definition: Imprecise. Near FAD of the graptolite Saetograptus leintwardinensis
- Lower boundary definition candidates: None
- Lower boundary GSSP candidate section(s): None
- Lower boundary GSSP: Sunnyhill, Ludlow, England; 52.3592°N 2.7772°W
- Lower GSSP ratified: 1980
- Upper boundary definition: FAD of the graptolite Monograptus parultimus
- Upper boundary GSSP: Požáry Section, Prague-Řeporyje, Czech Republic; 50.0277°N 14.3249°E
- Upper GSSP ratified: 1984

In the geologic timescale, the Ludfordian is the upper of two chronostratigraphic stages within the Ludlow Series. Its age is the late Silurian Period, and within both the Palaeozoic Era and Phanerozoic Eon. The rocks assigned to the Ludfordian date to between 425.0 ± 1.5 Ma and 422.7 ± 1.6 Ma (million years ago). The Ludfordian Stage succeeds the Gorstian Stage and precedes the Pridoli Epoch. It is named for the village of Ludford in Shropshire, England. The GSSP for the Ludfordian is represented as a thin shale seam, coincident with the base of the Leintwardine Formation, overlying the Bringewood Formation in England.

== Paleoclimate ==
The Lau event is a rapid pulse of cooling during the Ludfordian, about 424 million years ago; it is identified by a pulse of extinctions and oceanic changes. It is one of the series of fast sea-level and excursions in oxygen isotope ratios that signal fast switches between warm and cold climate states, characteristic of the Silurian climatic instability. The Lau Event occurred during an extended period of elevated seawater saturation state, explained by reservoirs of the planet's fresh water being locked up in massive polar ice caps. The sudden reappearance in normally saline marine environments of stromatolites and a mass occurrence of oncoids during the event suggested that minor extinction events like the Lau Event also resulted in periods of reduced grazing pressures on surviving "disaster biota", which can be compared to the aftermath of the more catastrophic end-Ordovician and end-Permian mass extinctions.
