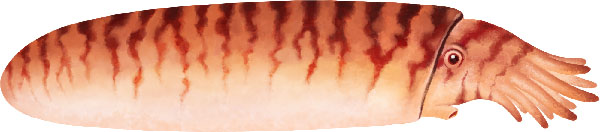
- Full-color live reconstruction of Sphooceras

Scientific classification
- Kingdom: Animalia
- Phylum: Mollusca
- Class: Cephalopoda
- Order: †Orthocerida
- Family: †Sphooceratidae; Flower, 1962
- Genus: †Sphooceras; Flower, 1962

Type species
- †Sphooceras truncatum (Barrande, 1860)

Species
- Sphooceras disjunctum; Sphooceras truncatum

= Sphooceras =

Sphooceras Temporal range: Latest Silurian - Earlier Emsian

Genus of primitive cephalopod

Sphooceras is a genus of primitive cephalopod from the Silurian period. Most fossils have been found in the Czech Republic, but possible fossils may also exist in other countries. It is currently known from two species, Sphooceras disjunctum and Sphooceras truncatum.

== Description ==
Multiple individuals of Sphooceras have been found, possibly even sporting various growth stages. While the larvae sported coiled shells, adult individuals were found have sported truncated, straight shells, giving them a rather sausage-like appearance. They are among the earliest cephalopods to sport a fully-covered mantle, similar to that of a cowrie, and may have even repaired such shells similarly. Fossilized remains also show possible patterning of stripes similar to those sported on the extant nautilus, probably for camouflage.
