= Silurian =

Third period of the Paleozoic Era

- 443.1 ± 0.9 – 419.62 ± 1.36 Ma
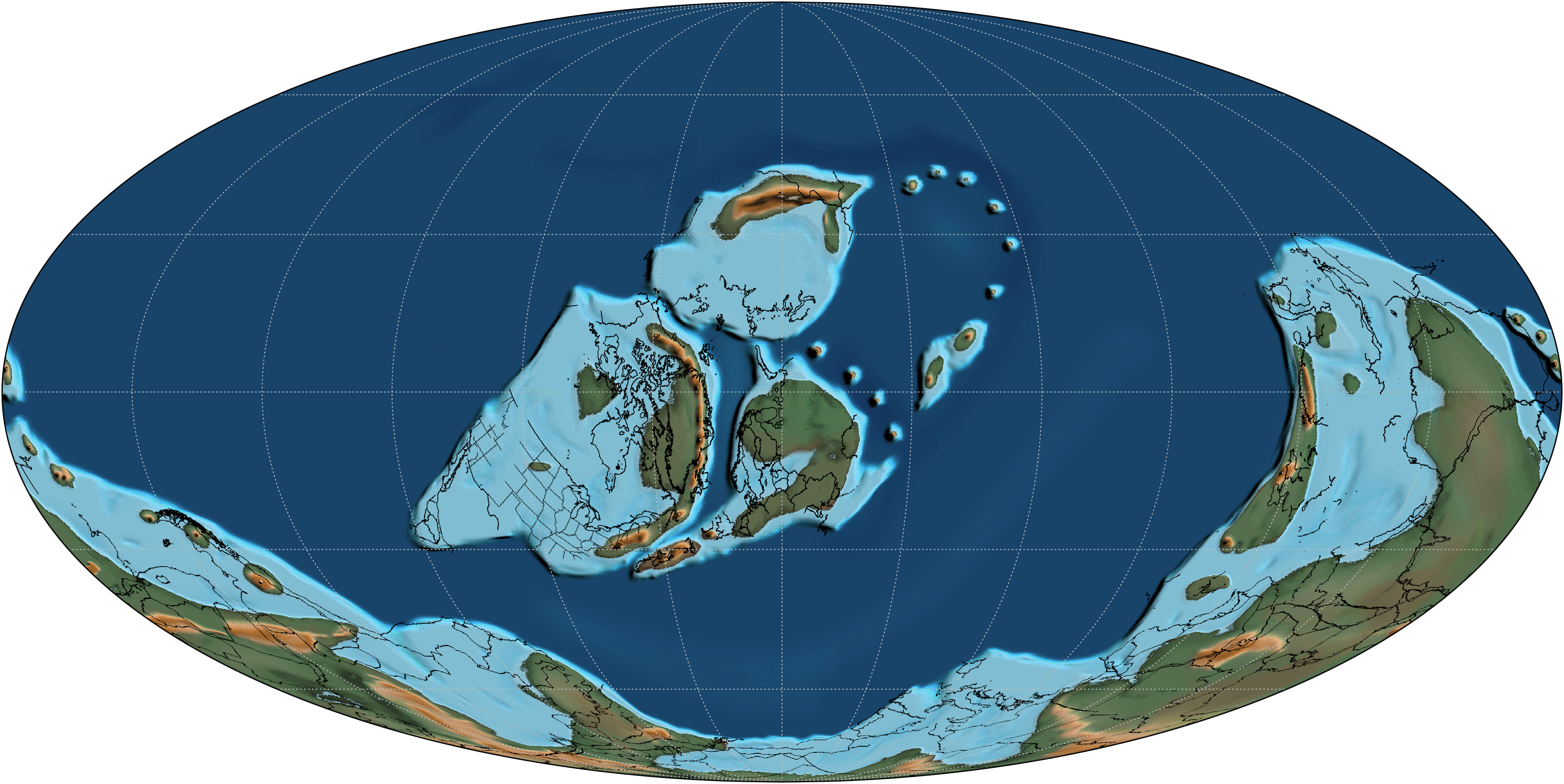
- Earth 430 million years ago in the Silurian Period, Wenlock Epoch

Chronology
← / Lau event; ← / Mulde event; ← / Ireviken event
Subdivision of the Silurian according to the ICS, as of 2024. Vertical axis scale: Millions of years ago

Etymology
- Name formality: Formal
- Synonym(s): Gotlandian

Usage information
- Celestial body: Earth
- Regional usage: Global (ICS)
- Time scale(s) used: ICS Time Scale

Definition
- Chronological unit: Period
- Stratigraphic unit: System
- First proposed by: Roderick Murchison, 1835
- Time span formality: Formal
- Lower boundary definition: FAD of the Graptolite Akidograptus ascensus
- Lower boundary GSSP: Dob's Linn, Moffat, United Kingdom; 55.4400°N 3.2700°W
- Lower GSSP ratified: 1984
- Upper boundary definition: FAD of the Graptolite Monograptus uniformis
- Upper boundary GSSP: Klonk, Czech Republic; 49.8550°N 13.7920°E
- Upper GSSP ratified: 1972

Atmospheric and climatic data
- Sea level above present day: Around 180 m, with short-term negative excursions

The Silurian (/sɪˈljʊəri.ən, saɪ-/ sih-LURE-ee-ən, sy-) is a geologic period and system spanning 23.5 million years from the end of the Ordovician Period, at 443.1 Ma (million years ago) to the beginning of the Devonian Period, 419.62 Ma. The Silurian is the third and shortest period of the Paleozoic Era, and the third of twelve periods of the Phanerozoic Eon. As with other geologic periods, the rock beds that define the period's start and end are well identified, but the exact dates are uncertain by a few million years. The base of the Silurian is set at a series of major Ordovician–Silurian extinction events when up to 60% of marine genera were wiped out.

One important event in this period was the initial establishment of terrestrial life in what is known as the Silurian-Devonian Terrestrial Revolution: vascular plants emerged from more primitive land plants, dikaryan fungi started expanding and diversifying along with glomeromycotan fungi, and three groups of arthropods (myriapods, arachnids and hexapods) became fully terrestrialized.

Another significant evolutionary milestone during the Silurian was the diversification of jawed fish, which include placoderms, acanthodians (which gave rise to cartilaginous fish) and osteichthyan (bony fish, further divided into lobe-finned and ray-finned fishes), although this corresponded to sharp decline of jawless fish such as conodonts and ostracoderms.

== History of study ==
The Silurian system was first identified by the Scottish geologist Roderick Murchison, who was examining fossil-bearing sedimentary rock strata in south Wales in the early 1830s. He named the sequences for a Celtic tribe of Wales, the Silures, inspired by his friend Adam Sedgwick, who had named the period of his study the Cambrian, from a Latin name for Wales. Whilst the British rocks now identified as belonging to the Silurian System and the lands now thought to have been inhabited in antiquity by the Silures show little correlation (cf. Geologic map of Wales, Map of pre-Roman tribes of Wales), Murchison conjectured that their territory included Caer Caradoc and Wenlock Edge exposures—and that if it did not there were plenty of Silurian rocks elsewhere 'to sanction the name proposed'. In 1835 the two men presented a joint paper, under the title On the Silurian and Cambrian Systems, Exhibiting the Order in which the Older Sedimentary Strata Succeed each other in England and Wales, which was the germ of the modern geological time scale. As it was first identified, the "Silurian" series when traced farther afield quickly came to overlap Sedgwick's "Cambrian" sequence, however, provoking furious disagreements that ended the friendship.

The English geologist Charles Lapworth resolved the conflict by defining a new Ordovician system including the contested beds. An alternative name for the Silurian was "Gotlandian" after the strata of the Baltic island of Gotland.

The French geologist Joachim Barrande, building on Murchison's work, used the term Silurian in a more comprehensive sense than was justified by subsequent knowledge. He divided the Silurian rocks of Bohemia into eight stages. His interpretation was questioned in 1854 by Edward Forbes, and the later stages of Barrande; F, G and H have since been shown to be Devonian. Despite these modifications in the original groupings of the strata, it is recognized that Barrande established Bohemia as a classic ground for the study of the earliest Silurian fossils.

== Subdivisions ==
Subdivisions of the Silurian period
Epoch	Age	Start (Ma)	Etymology of Epochs and Stages	Notes
Llandovery	Rhuddanian	443.8	Cefn-Rhuddan Farm, Llandovery in Carmarthenshire, Wales	
Llandovery	Aeronian	440.8	Cwm Coed-Aeron Farm, Wales	Trefawr Track near the farm is the site of the GSSP.
Llandovery	Telychian	438.5	Pen-lan-Telych Farm, Llandovery, Wales	
Wenlock	Sheinwoodian	433.4	Sheinwood village, Much Wenlock and Wenlock Edge, Shropshire, England	During the Wenlock, the oldest-known tracheophytes of the genus Cooksonia, appear. The complexity of slightly later Gondwana plants like Baragwanathia, which resembled a modern clubmoss, indicates a much longer history for vascular plants, extending into the early Silurian or even Ordovician. The first terrestrial animals also appear in the Wenlock, represented by air-breathing millipedes from Scotland.
Wenlock	Homerian	430.5	Homer, Shropshire, England	During the Wenlock, the oldest-known tracheophytes of the genus Cooksonia, appear. The complexity of slightly later Gondwana plants like Baragwanathia, which resembled a modern clubmoss, indicates a much longer history for vascular plants, extending into the early Silurian or even Ordovician. The first terrestrial animals also appear in the Wenlock, represented by air-breathing millipedes from Scotland.
Ludlow	Gorstian	427.4	Gorsty village near Ludlow, Shropshire, England	
Ludlow	Ludfordian	425.6	Ludford, Shropshire, England	
Přídolí	—	423.0	Named after a locality at the Homolka a Přídolí nature reserve near the Prague suburb of Slivenec, Czech Republic	Přídolí is the old name of a cadastral field area.

== Paleogeography ==
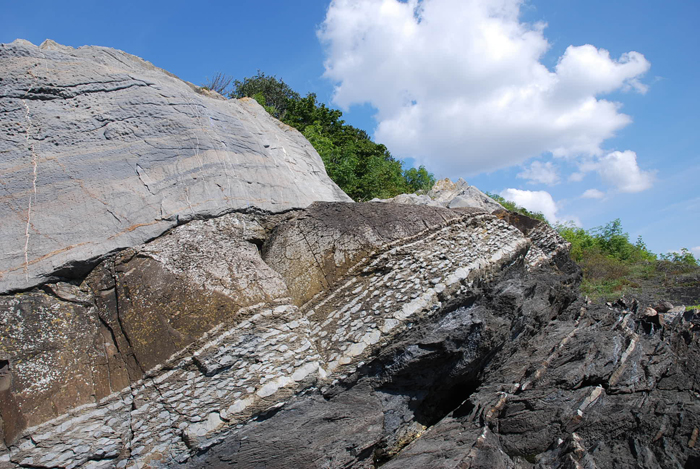
Ordovician–Silurian boundary on Hovedøya, Norway: the brownish late-Ordovician mudstone and later dark deep-water Silurian shale layers have been overturned by the Caledonian orogeny.

With the supercontinent Gondwana covering the equator and much of the southern hemisphere, a large ocean occupied most of the northern half of the globe. The high sea levels of the Silurian and the relatively flat land (with few significant mountain belts) resulted in a number of island chains, and thus a rich diversity of environmental settings.

During the Silurian, Gondwana continued a slow southward drift to high southern latitudes, but there is evidence that the Silurian icecaps were less extensive than those of the late-Ordovician glaciation. The southern continents remained united during this period. The melting of icecaps and glaciers contributed to a rise in sea level, recognizable from the fact that Silurian sediments overlie eroded Ordovician sediments, forming an unconformity. The continents of Avalonia, Baltica, and Laurentia drifted together near the equator, starting the formation of a second supercontinent known as Euramerica.

When the proto-Europe collided with North America, the collision folded coastal sediments that had been accumulating since the Cambrian off the east coast of North America and the west coast of Europe. This event is the Caledonian orogeny, a spate of mountain building that stretched from New York State through conjoined Europe and Greenland to Norway. At the end of the Silurian, sea levels dropped again, leaving telltale basins of evaporites extending from Michigan to West Virginia, and the new mountain ranges were rapidly eroded. The Teays River, flowing into the shallow mid-continental sea, eroded Ordovician Period strata, forming deposits of Silurian strata in northern Ohio and Indiana.

The vast ocean of Panthalassa covered most of the northern hemisphere. Other minor oceans include two phases of the Tethys, the Proto-Tethys and Paleo-Tethys, the Rheic Ocean, the Iapetus Ocean (a narrow seaway between Avalonia and Laurentia), and the newly formed Ural Ocean.

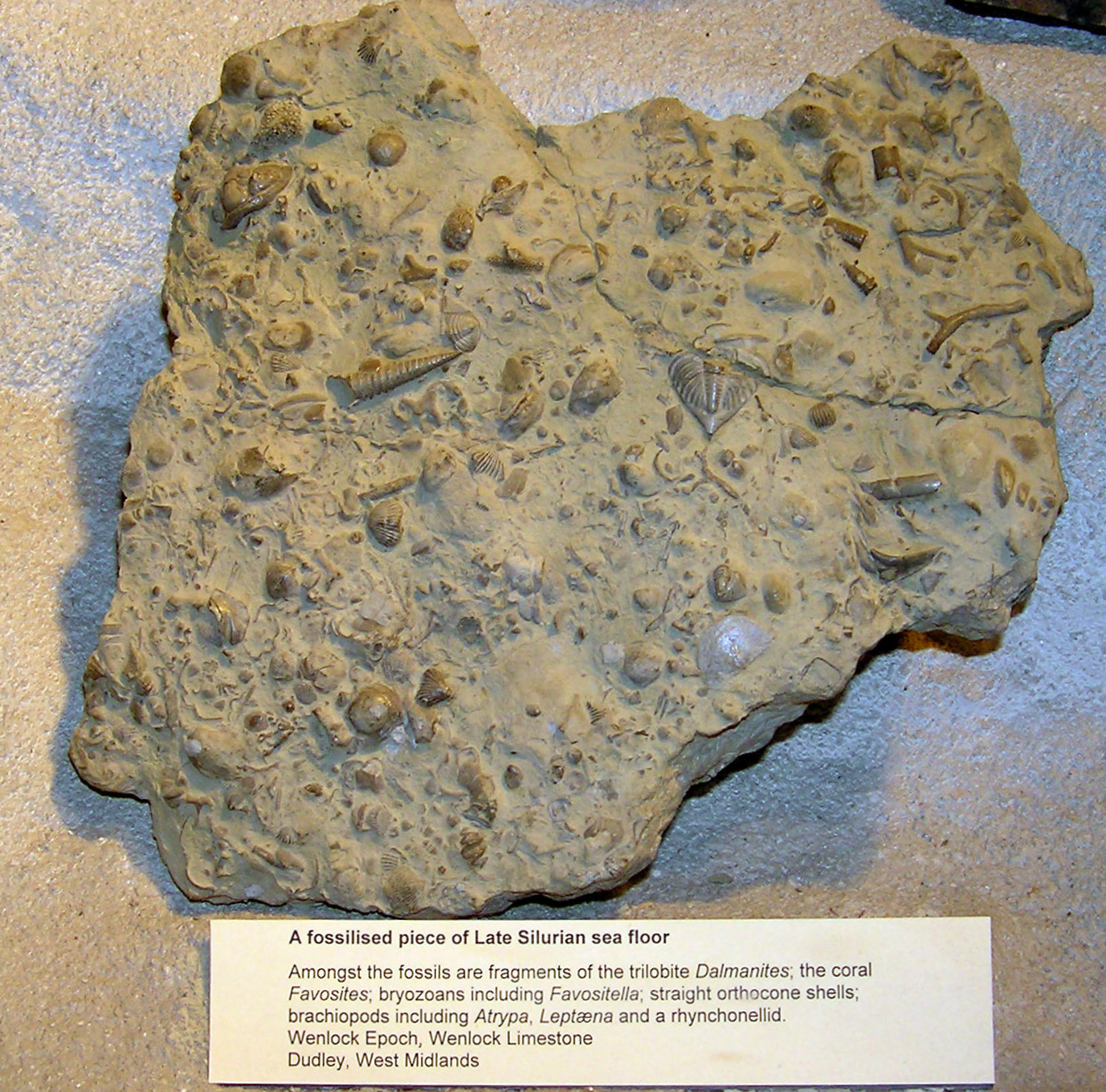
Fossils of the late Silurian sea bed, England

== Climate and sea level ==
The Silurian period was once believed to have enjoyed relatively stable and warm temperatures, in contrast with the extreme glaciations of the Ordovician before it and the extreme heat of the ensuing Devonian; however, it is now known that the global climate underwent many drastic fluctuations throughout the Silurian, evidenced by numerous major carbon and oxygen isotope excursions during this geologic period. Sea levels rose from their Hirnantian low throughout the first half of the Silurian; they subsequently fell throughout the rest of the period, although smaller scale patterns are superimposed on this general trend; fifteen high-stands (periods when sea levels were above the edge of the continental shelf) can be identified, and the highest Silurian sea level was probably around 140 metres (459 ft) higher than the lowest level reached.

During this period, the Earth entered a warm greenhouse phase, supported by high CO_{2} levels of 4,500 ppm, and warm shallow seas covered much of the equatorial land masses. Early in the Silurian, glaciers retreated back into the South Pole until they almost disappeared in the middle of Silurian. Layers of broken shells (called coquina) provide strong evidence of a climate dominated by violent storms generated then as now by warm sea surfaces.

=== Perturbations ===
The climate and carbon cycle appear to be rather unsettled during the Silurian, which had a higher frequency of isotopic excursions (indicative of climate fluctuations) than any other period. The Ireviken event, Mulde event, and Lau event each represent isotopic excursions following a minor mass extinction and associated with rapid sea-level change. Each one leaves a similar signature in the geological record, both geochemically and biologically; pelagic (free-swimming) organisms were particularly hard hit, as were brachiopods, corals, and trilobites, and extinctions rarely occur in a rapid series of fast bursts. The climate fluctuations are best explained by a sequence of glaciations, but the lack of tillites in the middle to late Silurian make this explanation problematic.

== Flora and fauna ==
The Silurian period has been viewed by some palaeontologists as an extended recovery interval following the Late Ordovician mass extinction (LOME), which interrupted the cascading increase in biodiversity that had continuously gone on throughout the Cambrian and most of the Ordovician.

The Silurian was the first period to see megafossils of extensive terrestrial biota in the form of moss-like miniature forests along lakes and streams and networks of large, mycorrhizal nematophytes, heralding the beginning of the Silurian-Devonian Terrestrial Revolution. However, the land fauna did not have a major impact on the Earth until it diversified in the Devonian.

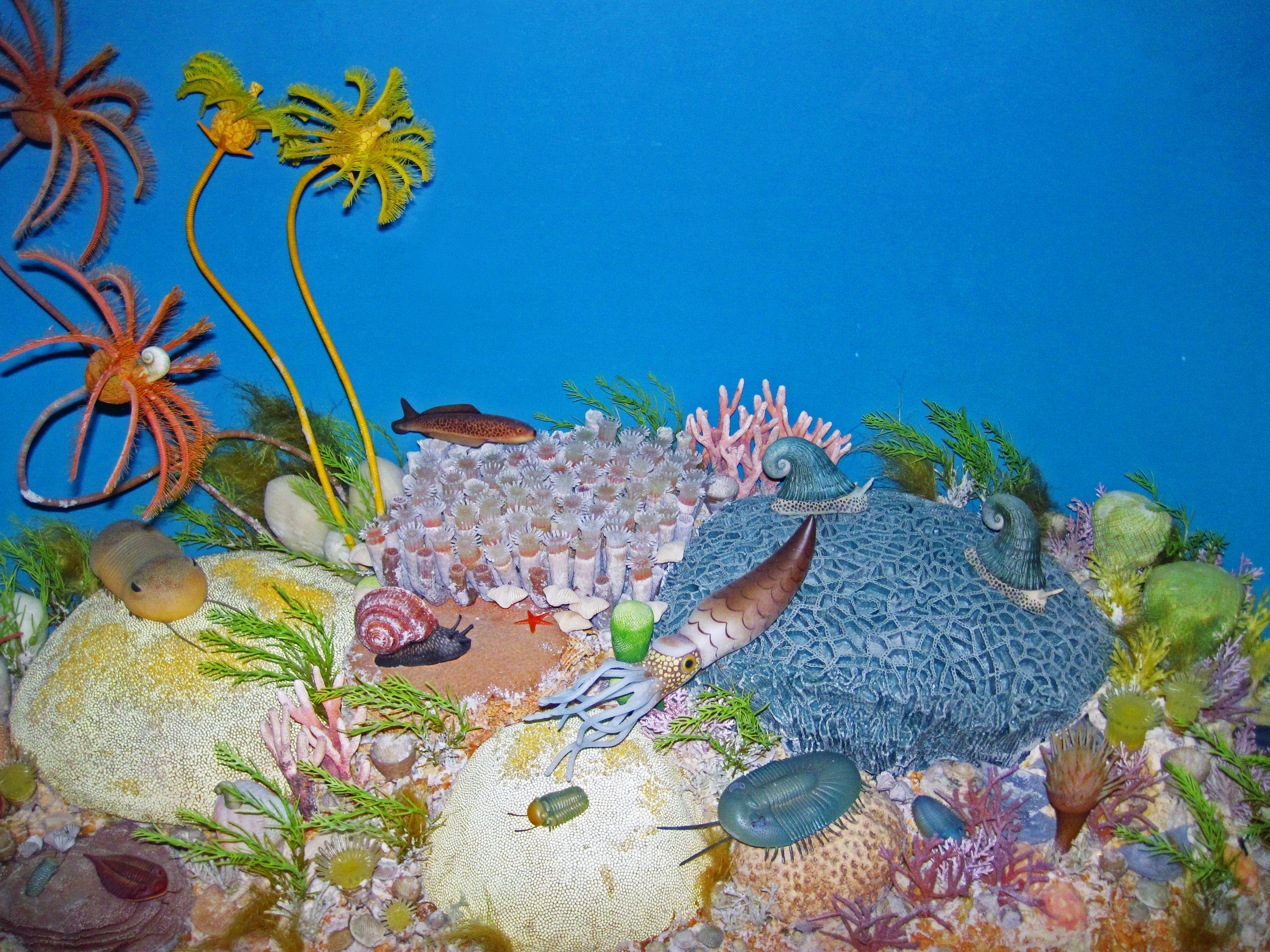
Diorama of a Silurian seafloor

The first fossil records of vascular plants, that is, land plants with tissues that carry water and food, appeared in the second half of the Silurian Period. The earliest-known representatives of this group are Cooksonia. Most of the sediments containing Cooksonia are marine in nature. Preferred habitats were likely along rivers and streams. Baragwanathia appears to be almost as old, dating to the Přídolí (420 Ma) and has branching stems and needle-like leaves of 10–20 centimetres (3.9–7.9 in). The plant shows a high degree of development in relation to the age of its fossil remains. Fossils of this plant have been recorded in Australia, Canada, and China. Eohostimella heathana is an early, probably terrestrial, "plant" known from compression fossils of Early Silurian (Llandovery) age. The chemistry of its fossils is similar to that of fossilised vascular plants, rather than algae.

Fossils that are considered as terrestrial animals are also known from the Silurian. The definitive oldest record of millipede ever known is Kampecaris obanensis and Archidesmus sp. from the late Silurian (425 Ma) of Kerrera. There are also other millipedes, centipedes, and trigonotarbid arachnoids known from Přídolí (420 Ma). Predatory invertebrates would indicate that simple food webs were in place that included non-predatory prey animals. Extrapolating back from Early Devonian biota, Andrew Jeram et al. in 1990 suggested a food web based on as-yet-undiscovered detritivores and grazers on micro-organisms. Millipedes from Cowie Formation such as Cowiedesmus and Pneumodesmus were considered as the oldest millipede from the middle Silurian at 428–430 Ma, although the age of this formation is later reinterpreted to be from the early Devonian instead by some researchers. Regardless, Pneumodesmus is still an important fossil as the oldest definitive evidence of spiracles to breathe in the air.

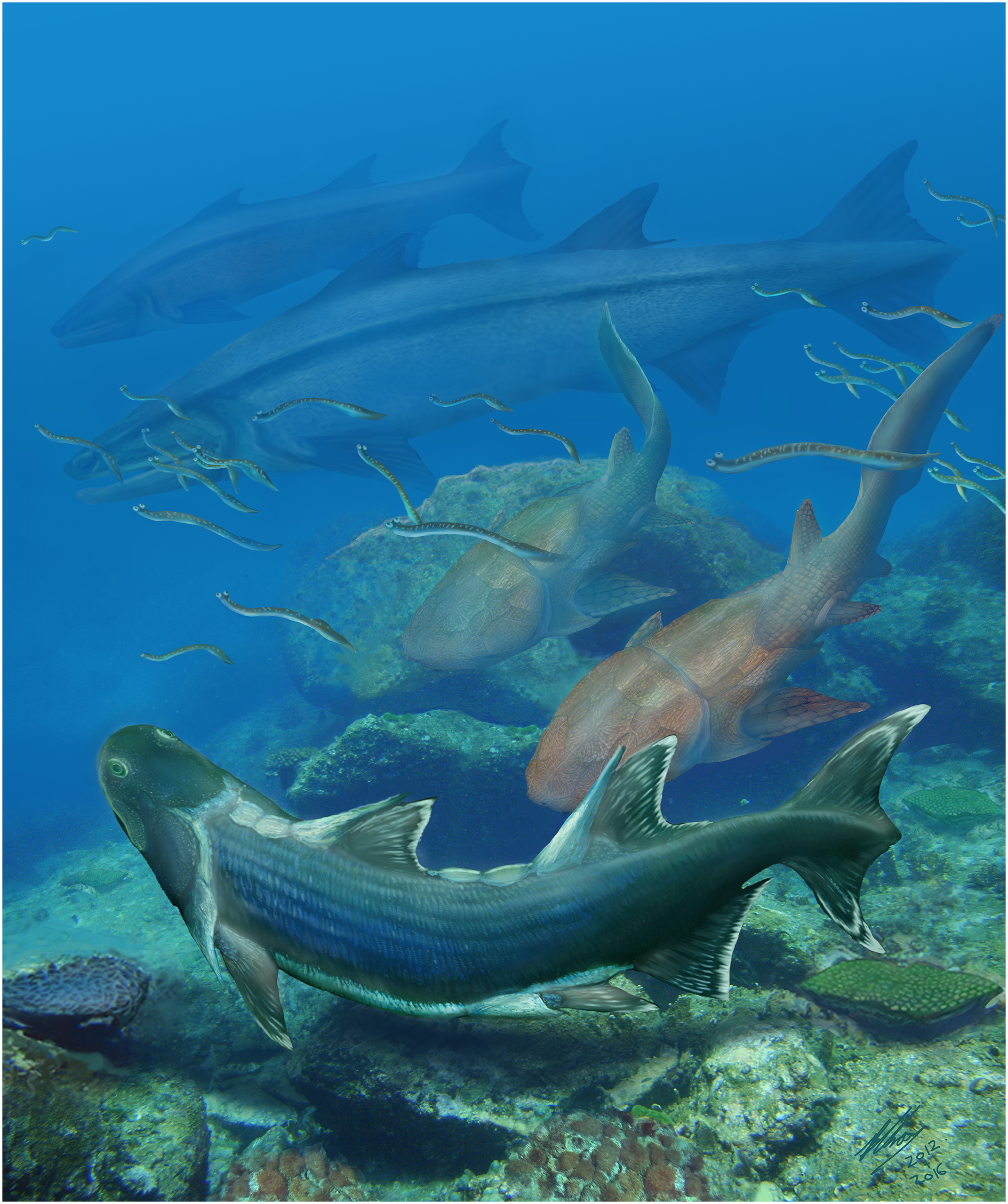
Life restoration of sarcopterygian Sparalepis tingi and other fauna from the Silurian of Yunnan

The first bony fish, the Osteichthyes, appeared, represented by the Acanthodians covered with bony scales. Fish reached considerable diversity and developed movable jaws, adapted from the supports of the front two or three gill arches. A diverse fauna of eurypterids (sea scorpions)—some of them a few metres in length—prowled the shallow Silurian seas and lakes of North America; many of their fossils have been found in New York state. Brachiopods were abundant and diverse, with the taxonomic composition, ecology, and biodiversity of Silurian brachiopods mirroring Ordovician ones. Brachiopods that survived the LOME developed novel adaptations for environmental stress, and they tended to be endemic to a single palaeoplate in the mass extinction's aftermath, but expanded their range afterwards. The most abundant brachiopods were atrypids and pentamerides; atrypids were the first to recover and rediversify in the Rhuddanian after LOME, while pentameride recovery was delayed until the Aeronian. Bryozoans exhibited significant degrees of endemism to a particular shelf. They also developed symbiotic relationships with cnidarians and stromatolites. Many bivalve fossils have also been found in Silurian deposits, and the first deep-boring bivalves are known from this period. Chitons saw a peak in diversity during the middle of the Silurian. Hederelloids enjoyed significant success in the Silurian, with some developing symbioses with the colonial rugose coral Entelophyllum. The Silurian was a heyday for tentaculitoids, which experienced an evolutionary radiation focused mainly in Baltoscandia, along with an expansion of their geographic range in the Llandovery and Wenlock. Trilobites started to recover in the Rhuddanian, and they continued to enjoy success in the Silurian as they had in the Ordovician despite their reduction in clade diversity as a result of LOME. The Early Silurian was a chaotic time of turnover for crinoids as they rediversified after LOME. Members of Flexibilia, which were minimally impacted by LOME, took on an increasing ecological prominence in Silurian seas. Monobathrid camerates, like flexibles, diversified in the Llandovery, whereas cyathocrinids and dendrocrinids diversified later in the Silurian. Scyphocrinoid loboliths suddenly appeared in the terminal Silurian, shortly before the Silurian-Devonian boundary, and disappeared as abruptly as they appeared very shortly after their first appearance. Endobiotic symbionts were common in the corals and stromatoporoids. Rugose corals especially were colonised and encrusted by a diverse range of epibionts, including certain hederelloids as aforementioned. Photosymbiotic scleractinians made their first appearance during the Middle Silurian. Reef abundance was patchy; sometimes, fossils are frequent, but at other points, are virtually absent from the rock record.

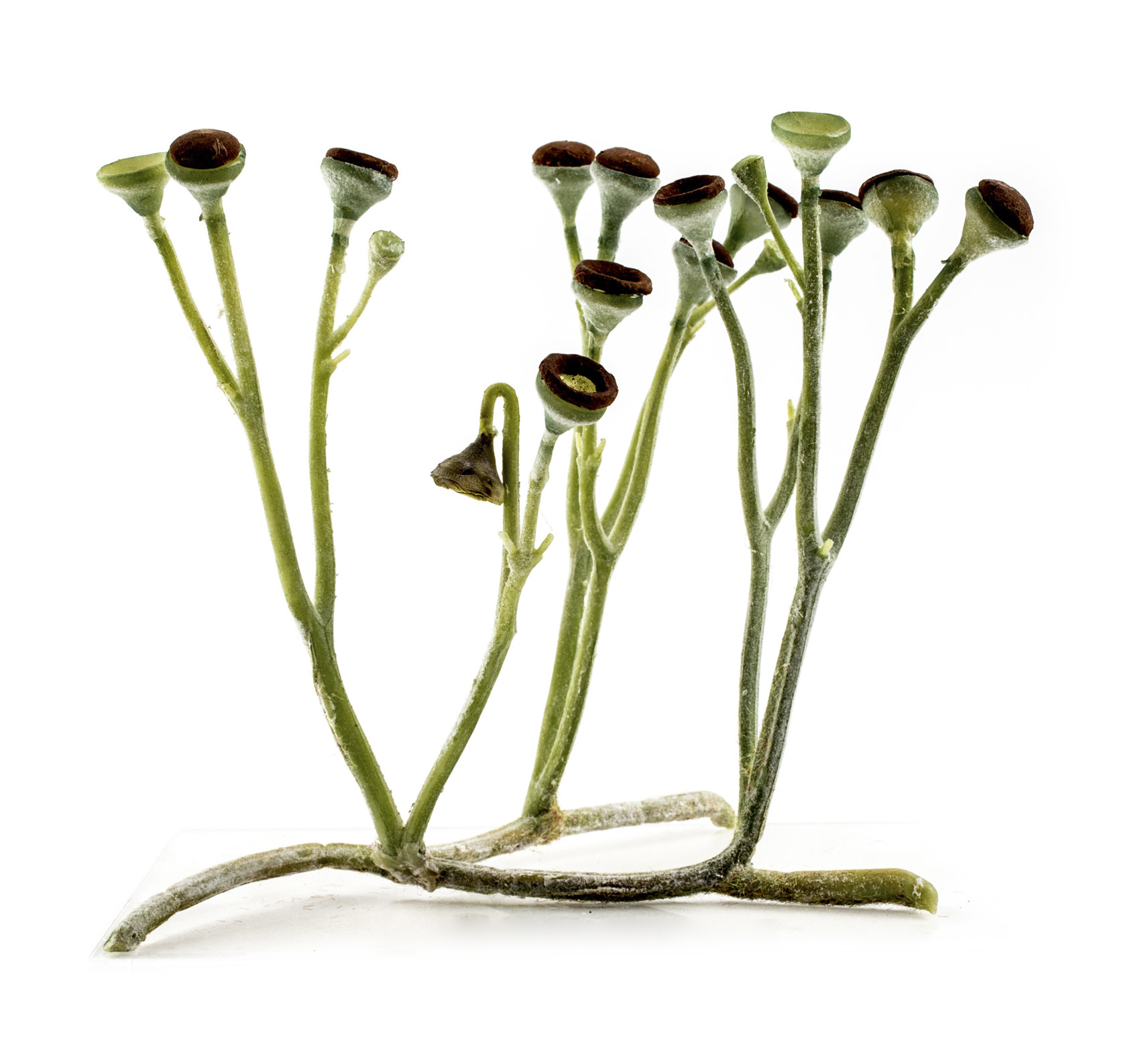
Cooksonia, the earliest vascular plant, middle Silurian

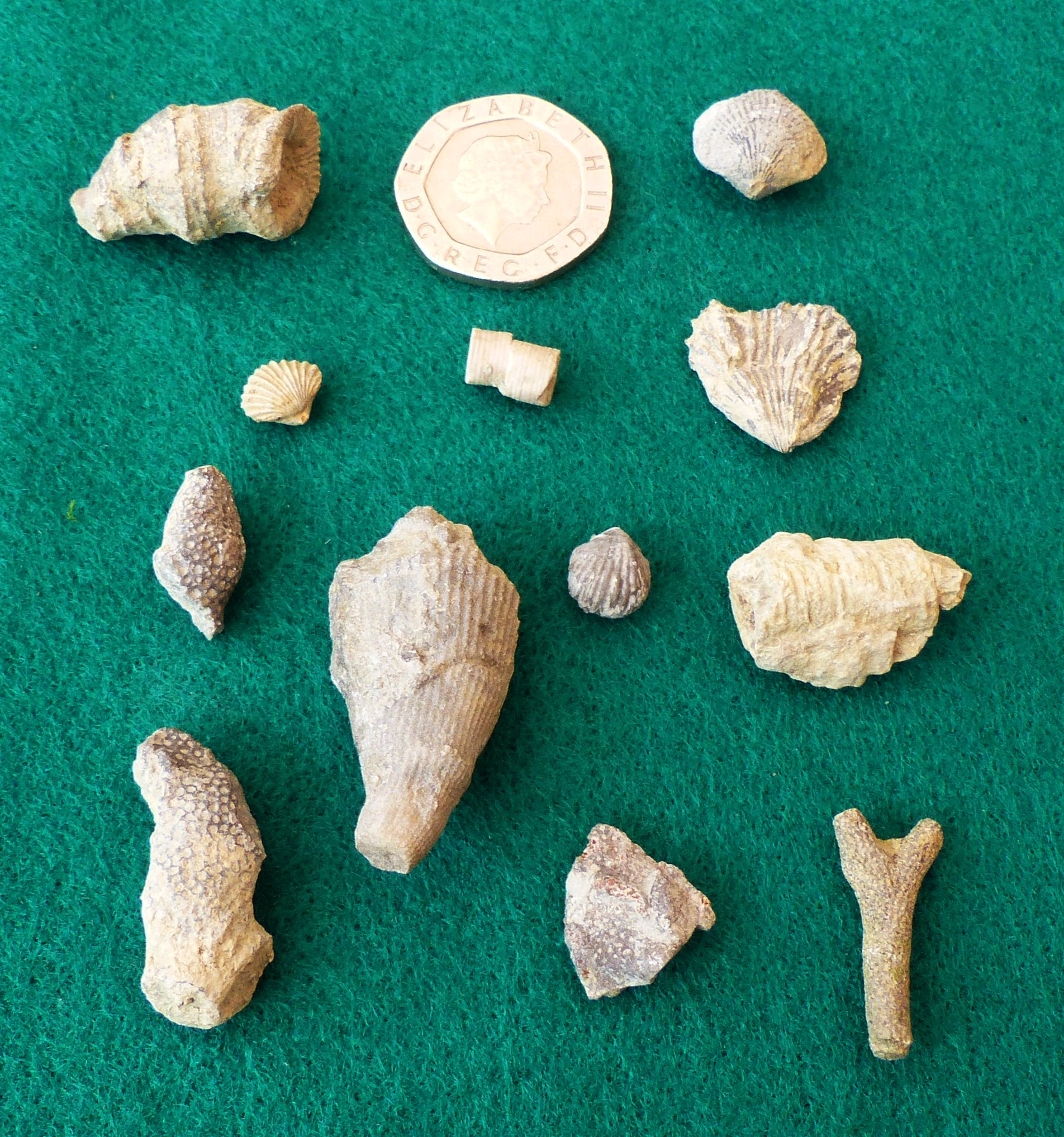
Silurian sea bed fossils collected from Wren's Nest Nature Reserve, Dudley, UK

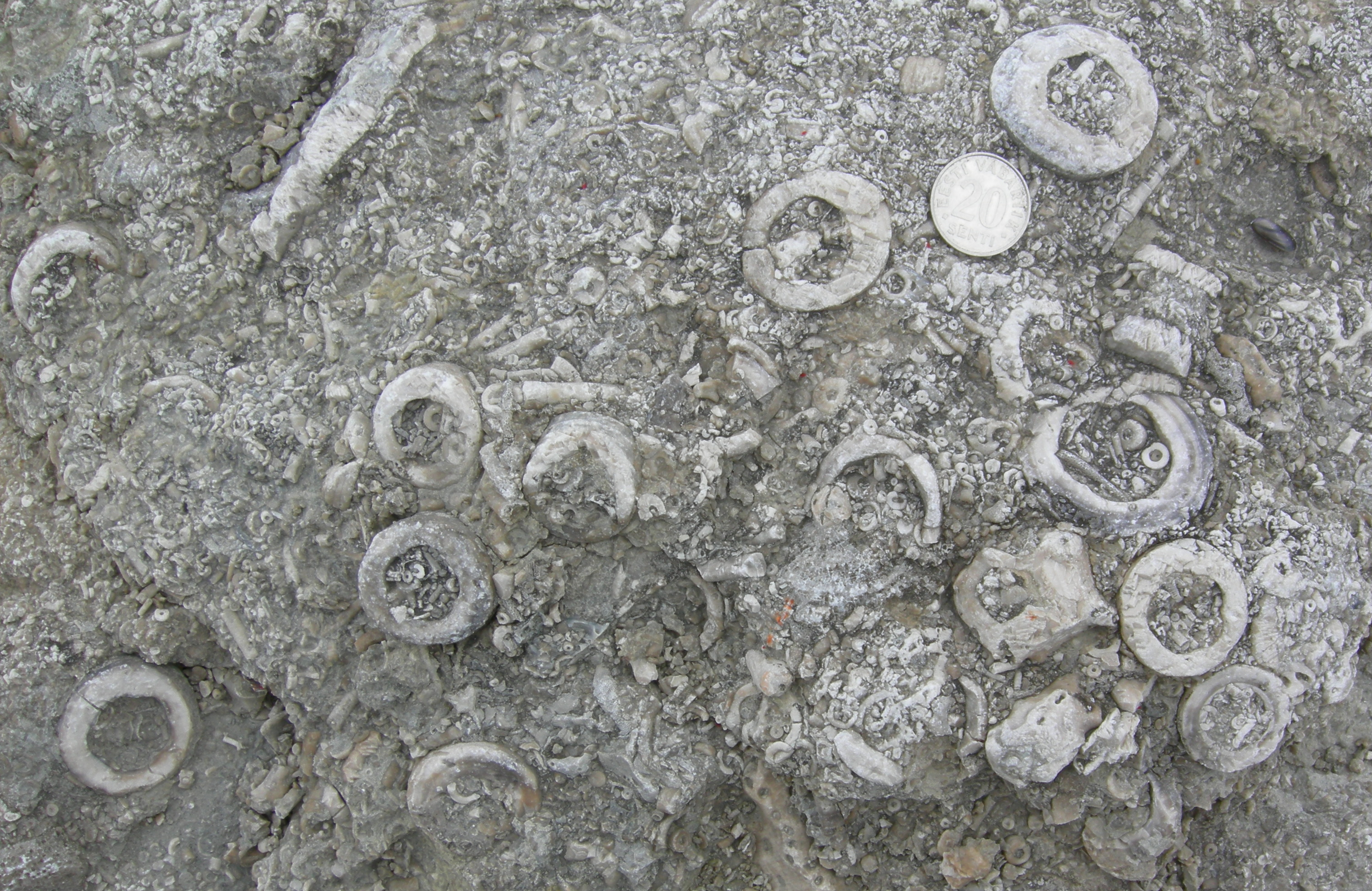
Crinoid fragments in a Silurian (Přídolí) limestone (Saaremaa, Estonia)

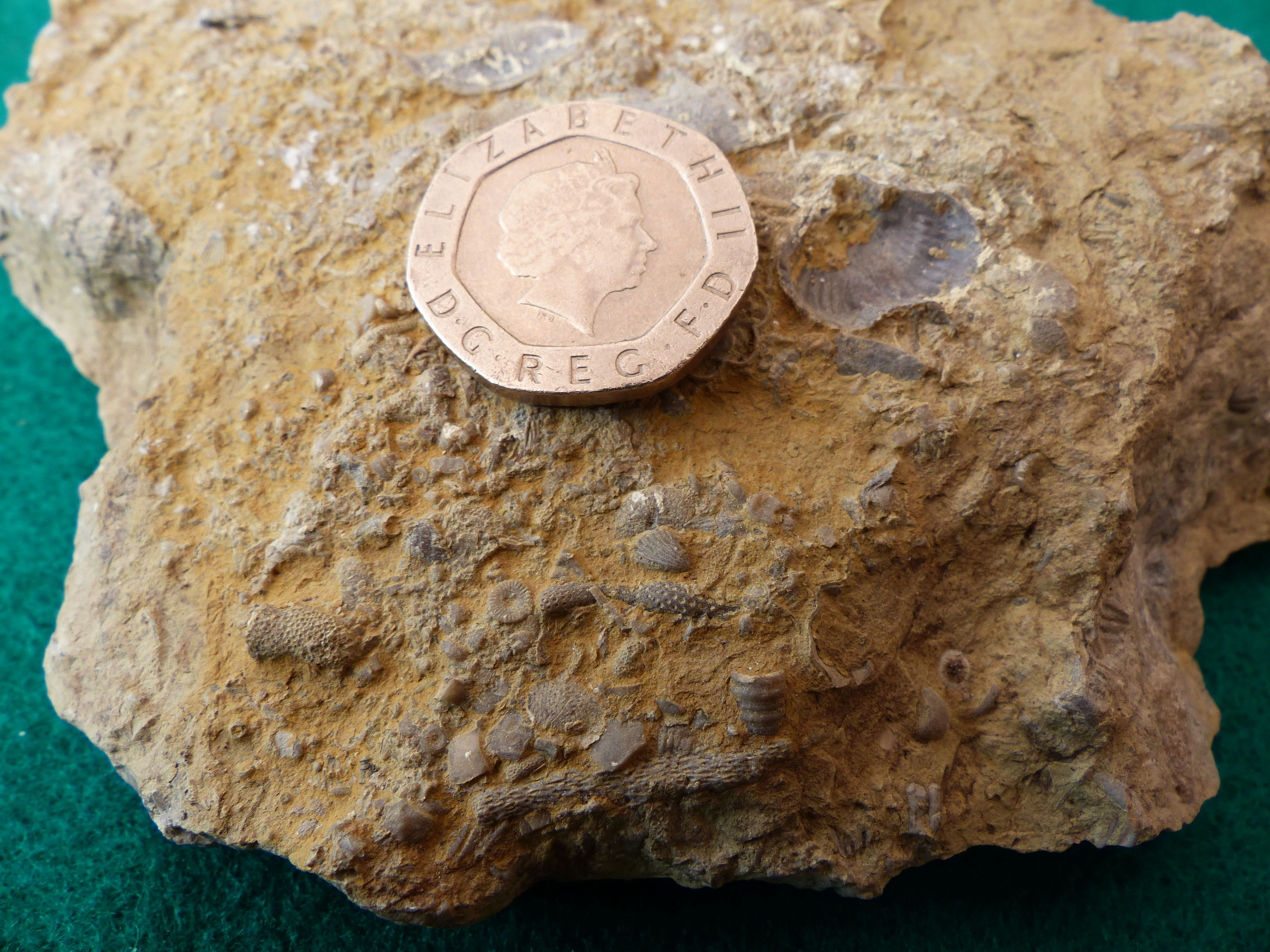
Silurian sea bed fossils collected from Wren's Nest Nature Reserve, Dudley UK

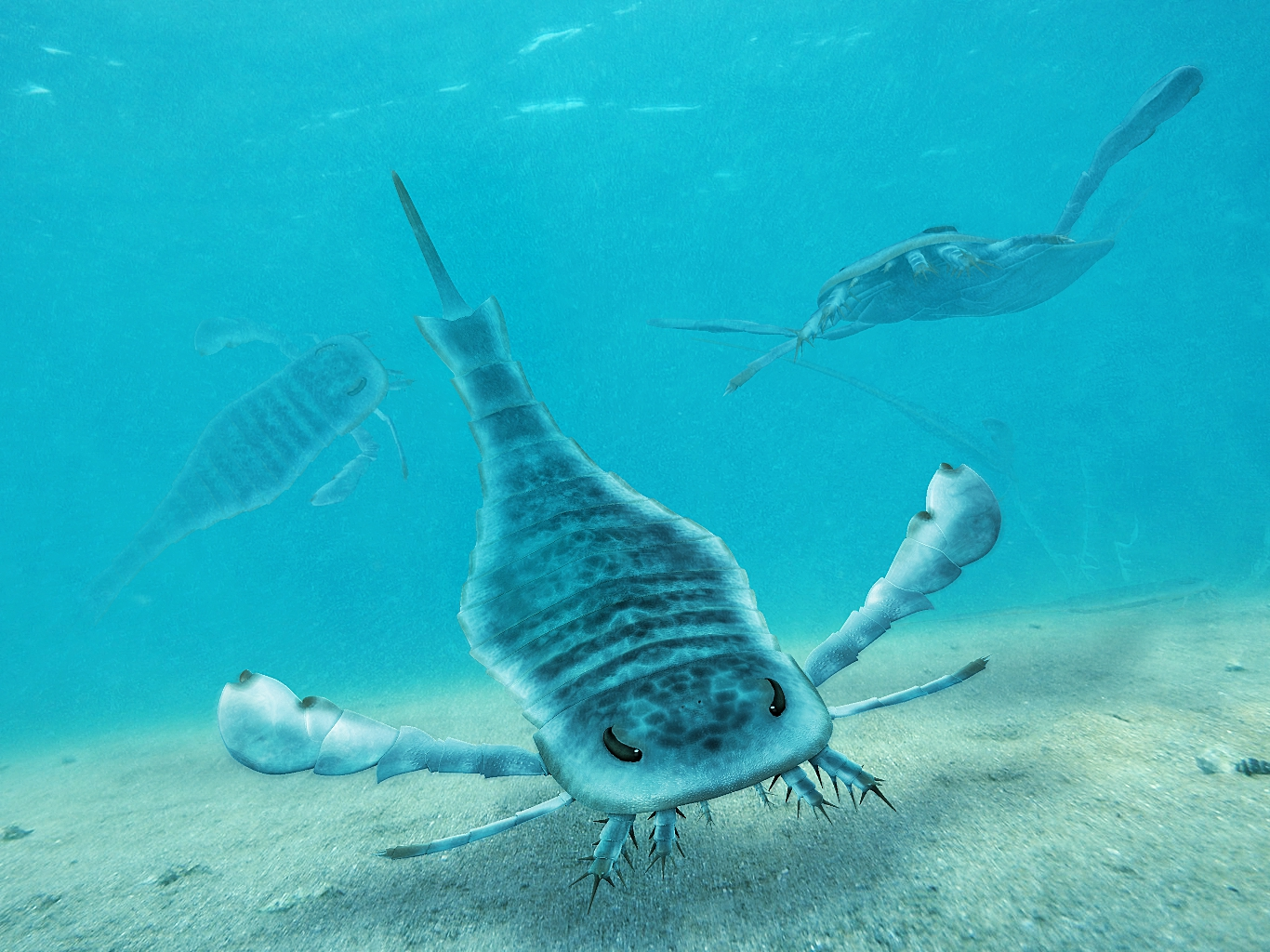
Eurypterus, a common Upper Silurian eurypterid

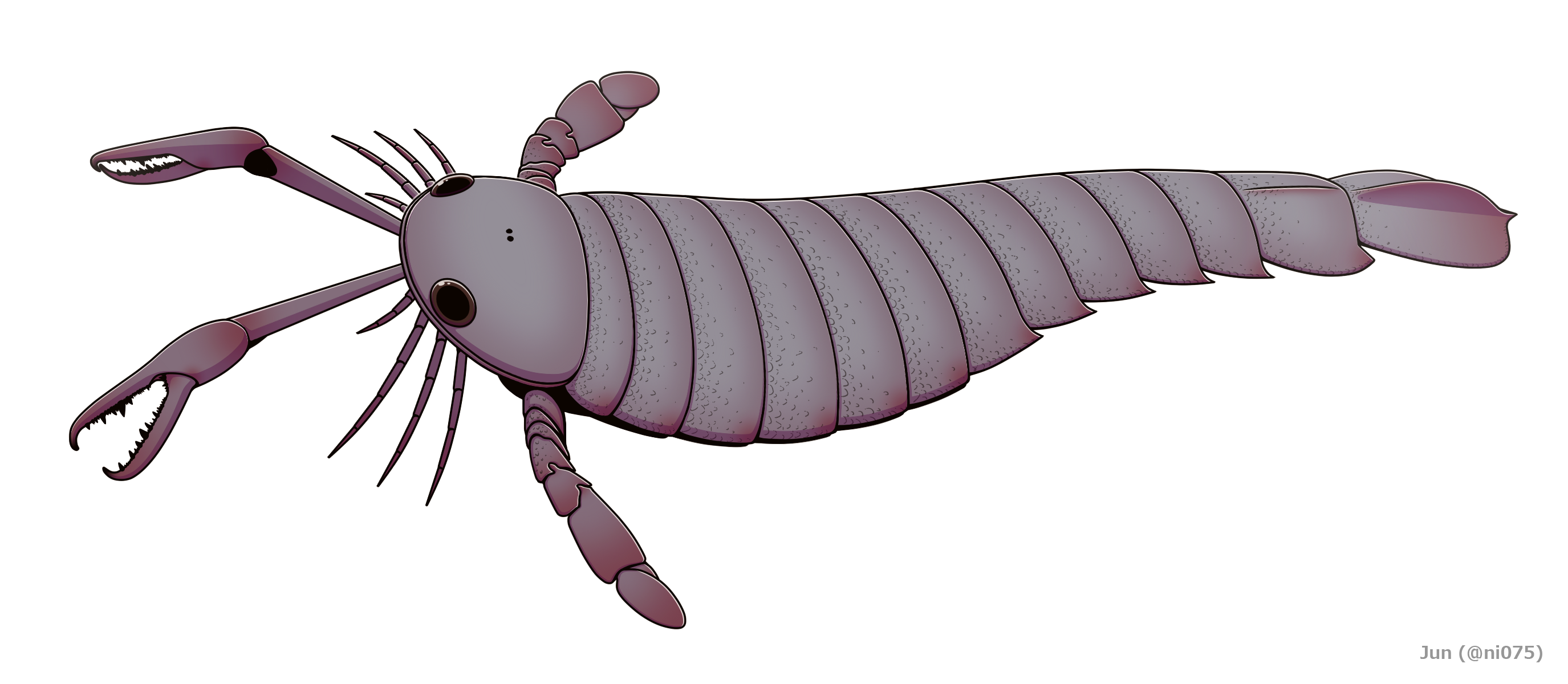
Pterygotus, a widely distributed giant eurypterid (reconstruction shown here is Devonian species P. anglicus)

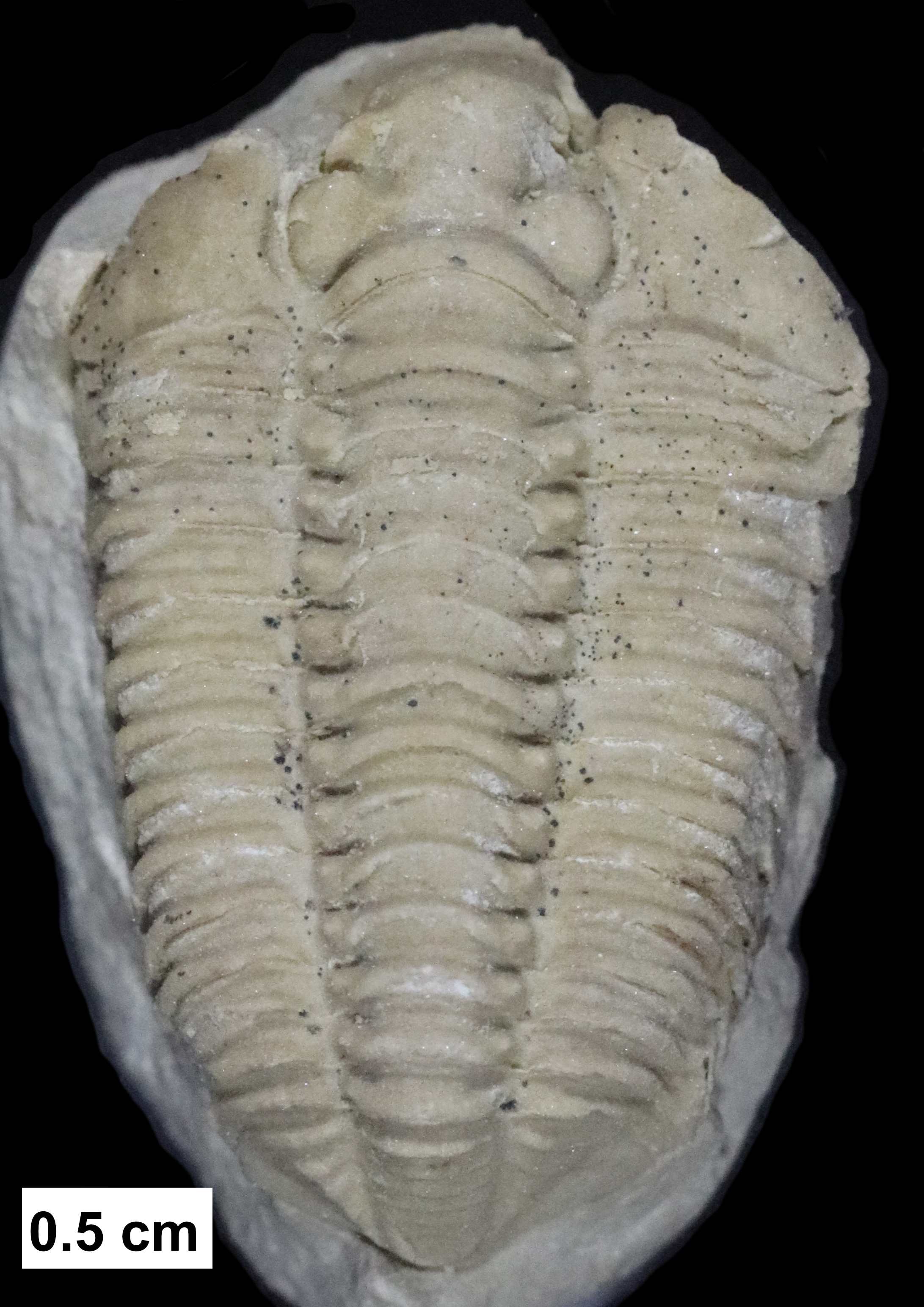
Trilobites were still diverse and common in the Silurian. Fossils of Calymene celebra are extremely abundant in parts of central U.S.

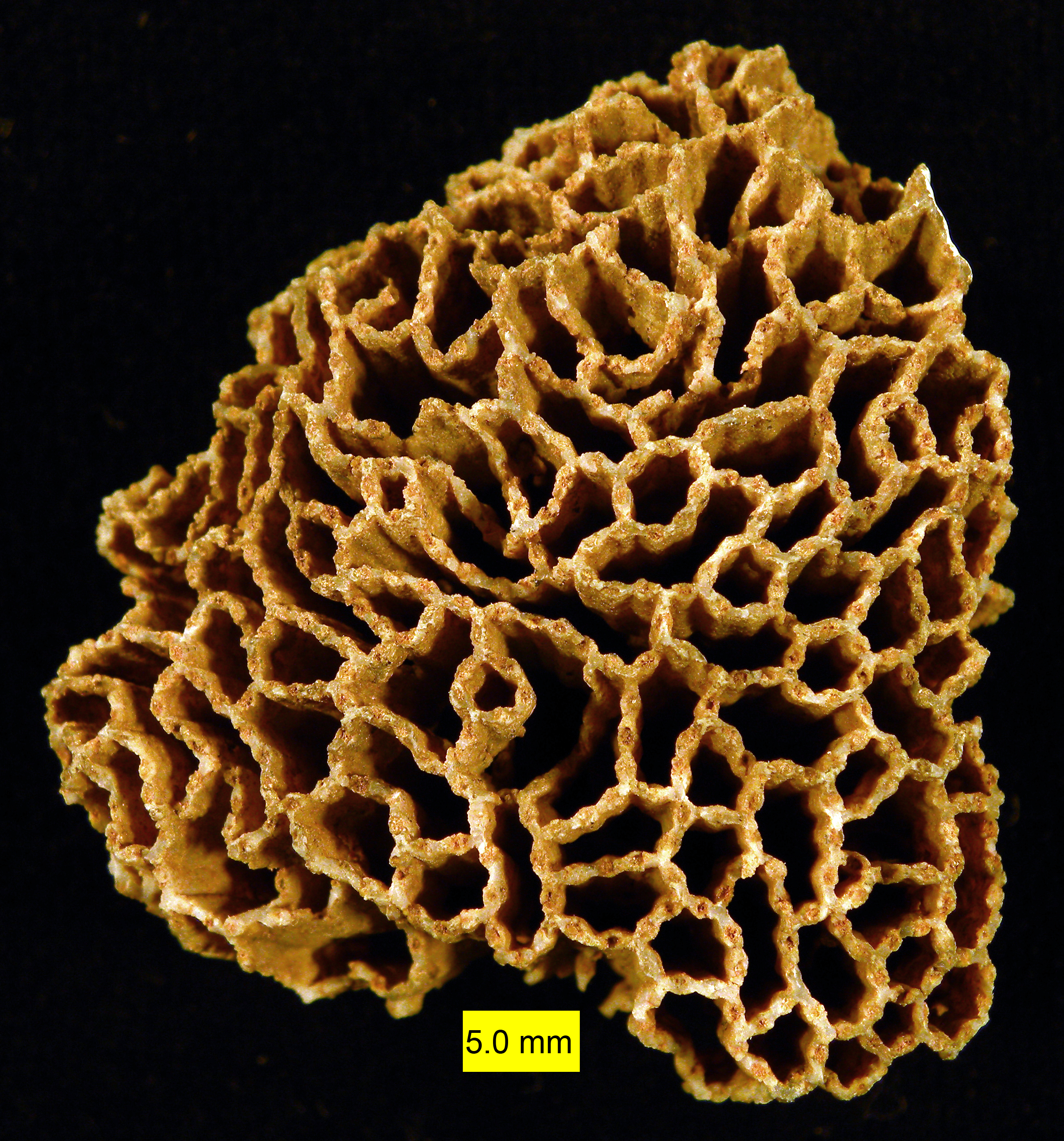
Halysites was a Tabulate coral, an extinct group that lived through the Paleozoic.

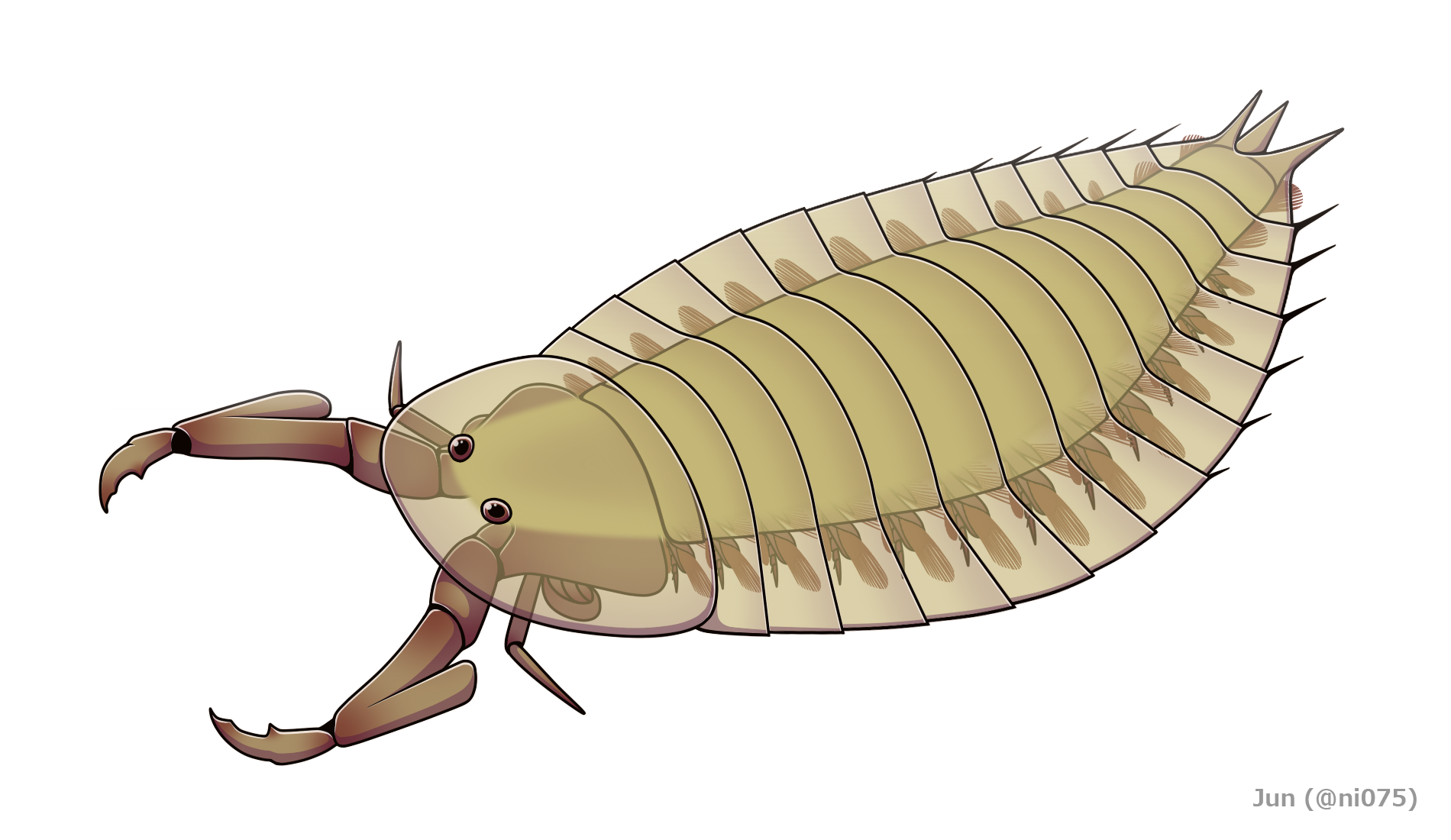
Parioscorpio was an enigmatic arthropod from the Silurian of Wisconsin.

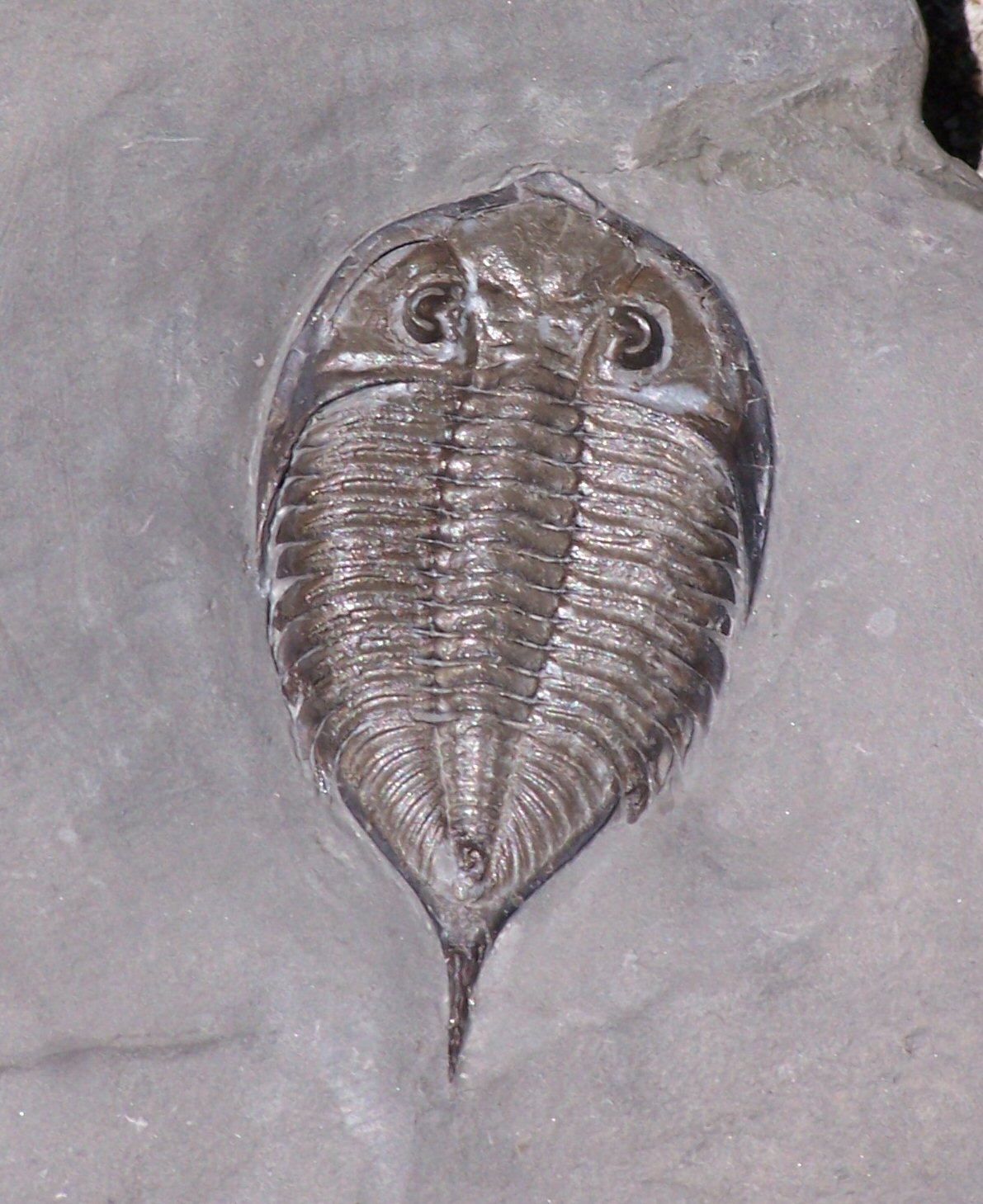
A Dalmanites limulurus specimen from Silurian strata of New York

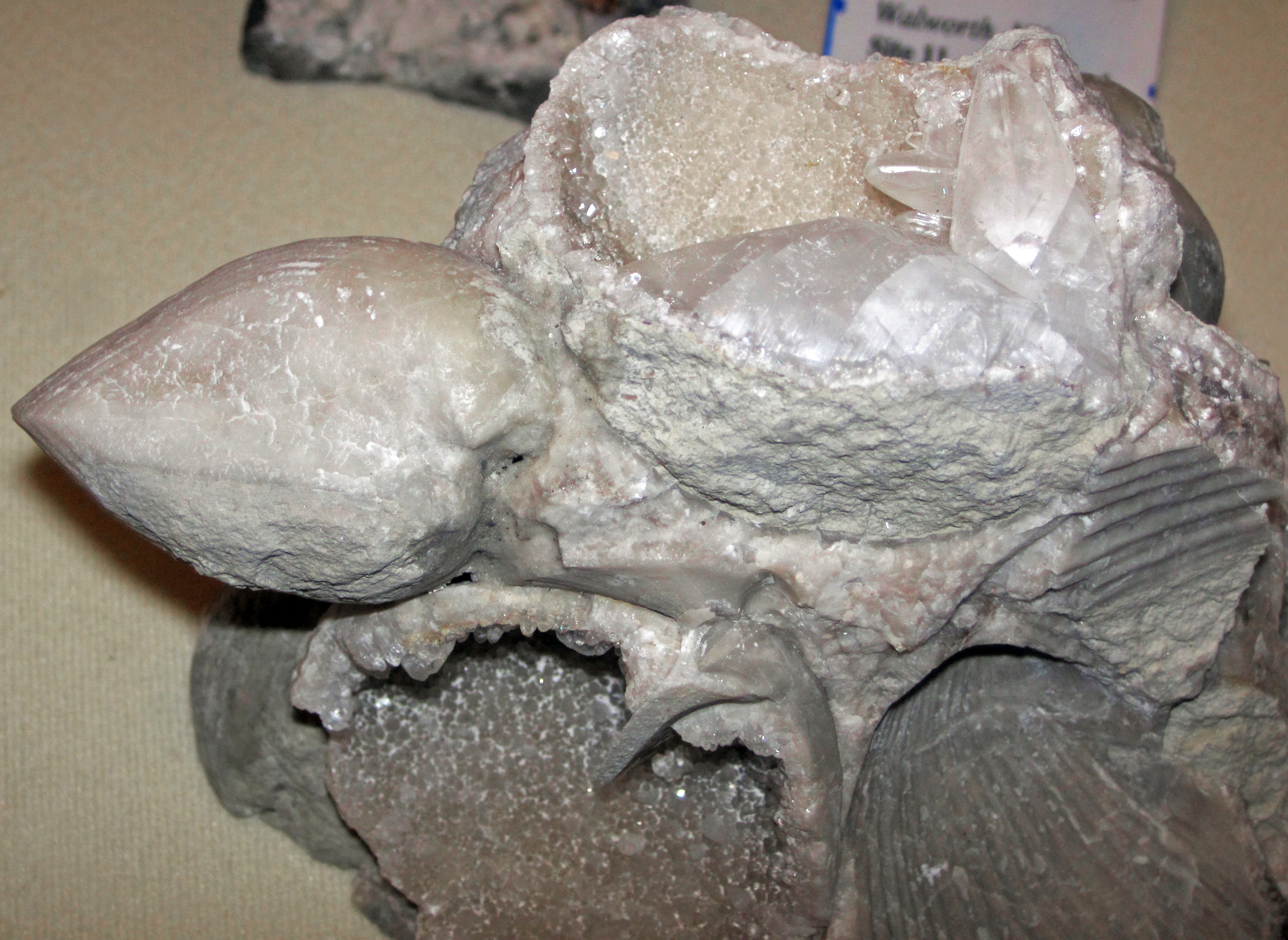
A rock containing several geodized pentamerid brachiopods from strata in Indiana

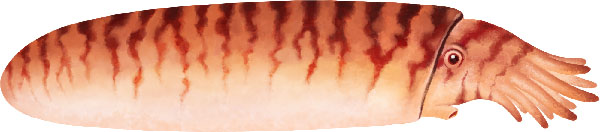
Sphooceras was a Nautiloid cephalopod found in Silurian strata of the Czech Republic.

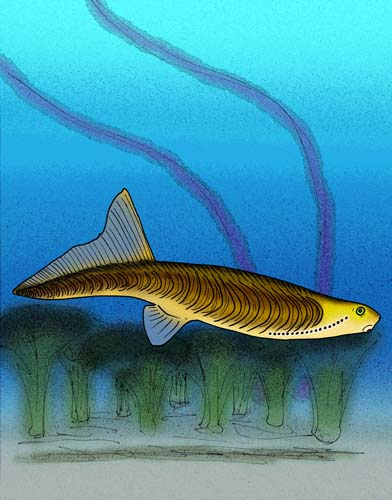
Jamoytius was an enigmatic vertebrate that is possibly related to Anaspid fish.

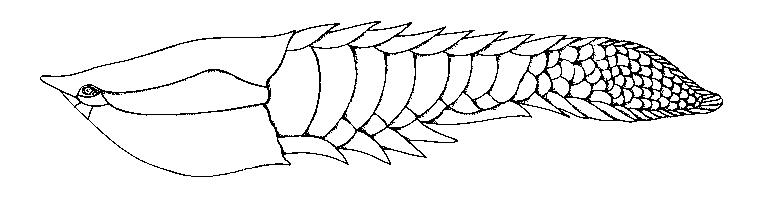
Poraspis, a genus of armored jawless fish from the Late Silurian of Canada, Norway and the U.S.

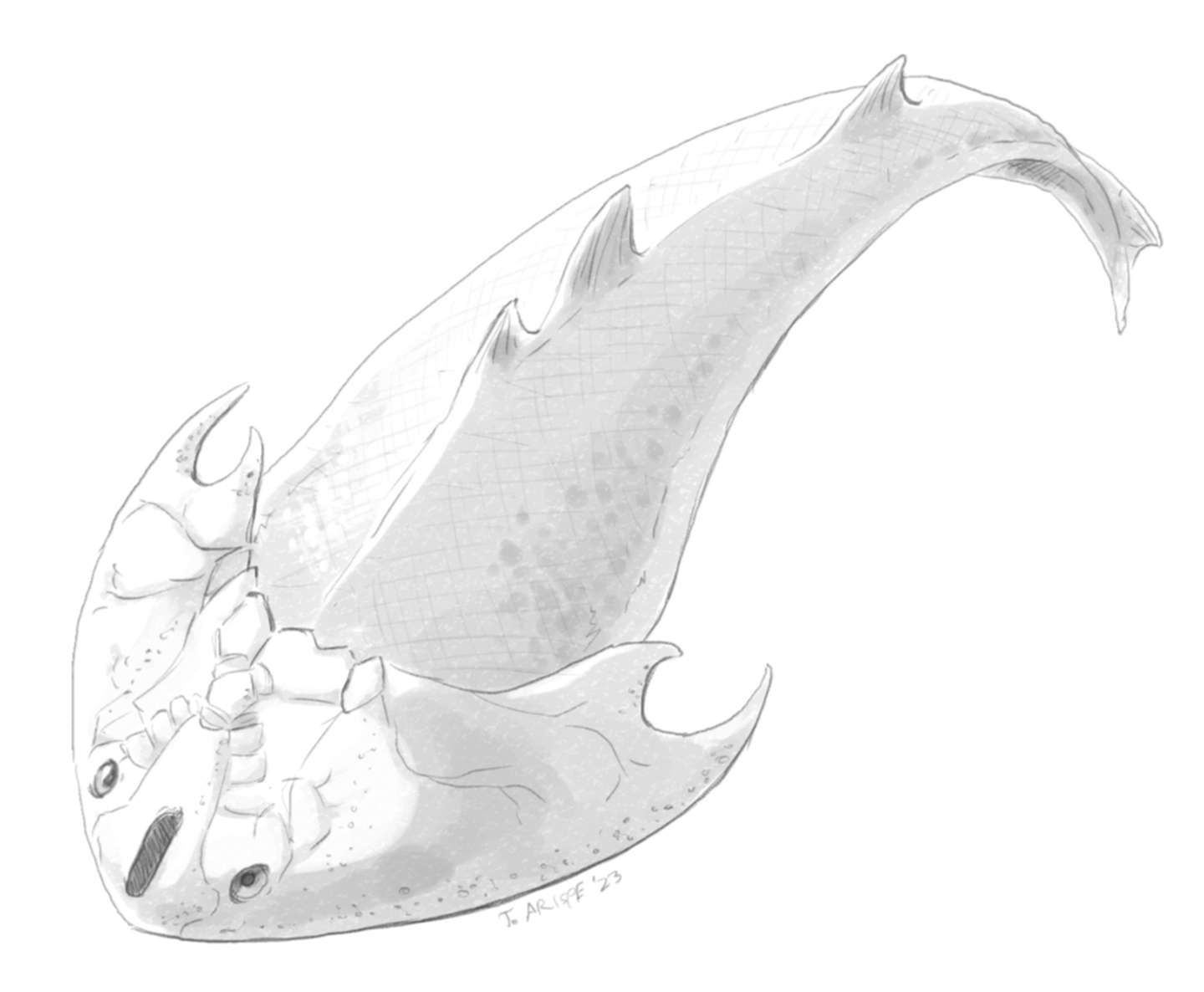
Tujiaaspis is a galeaspid agnathan from the early Silurian (Telychian) of China, showing origin of paired fins.

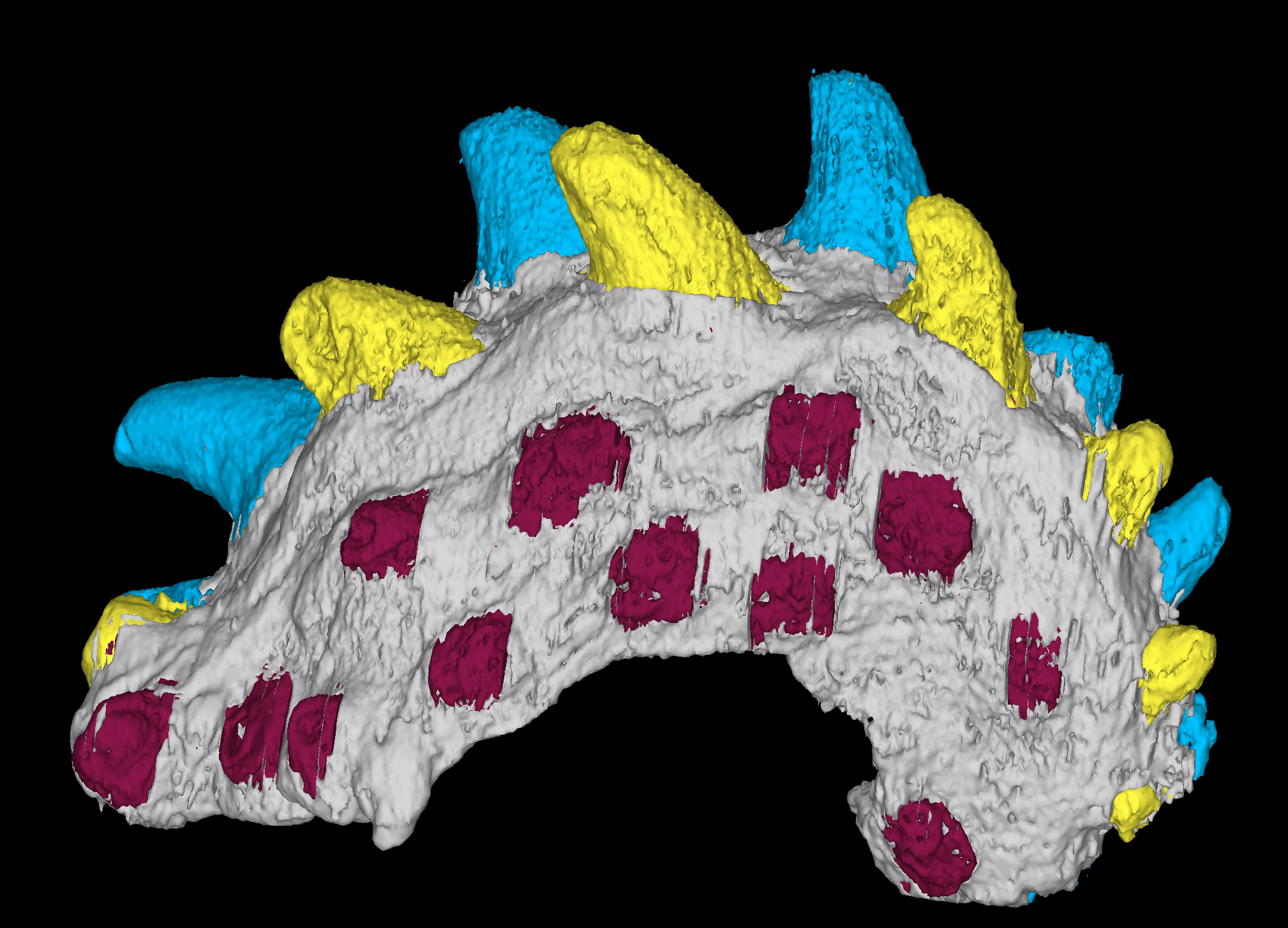
Qianodus is a tooth-based chondrichthyan genus from the early Silurian (Aeronian) of China.

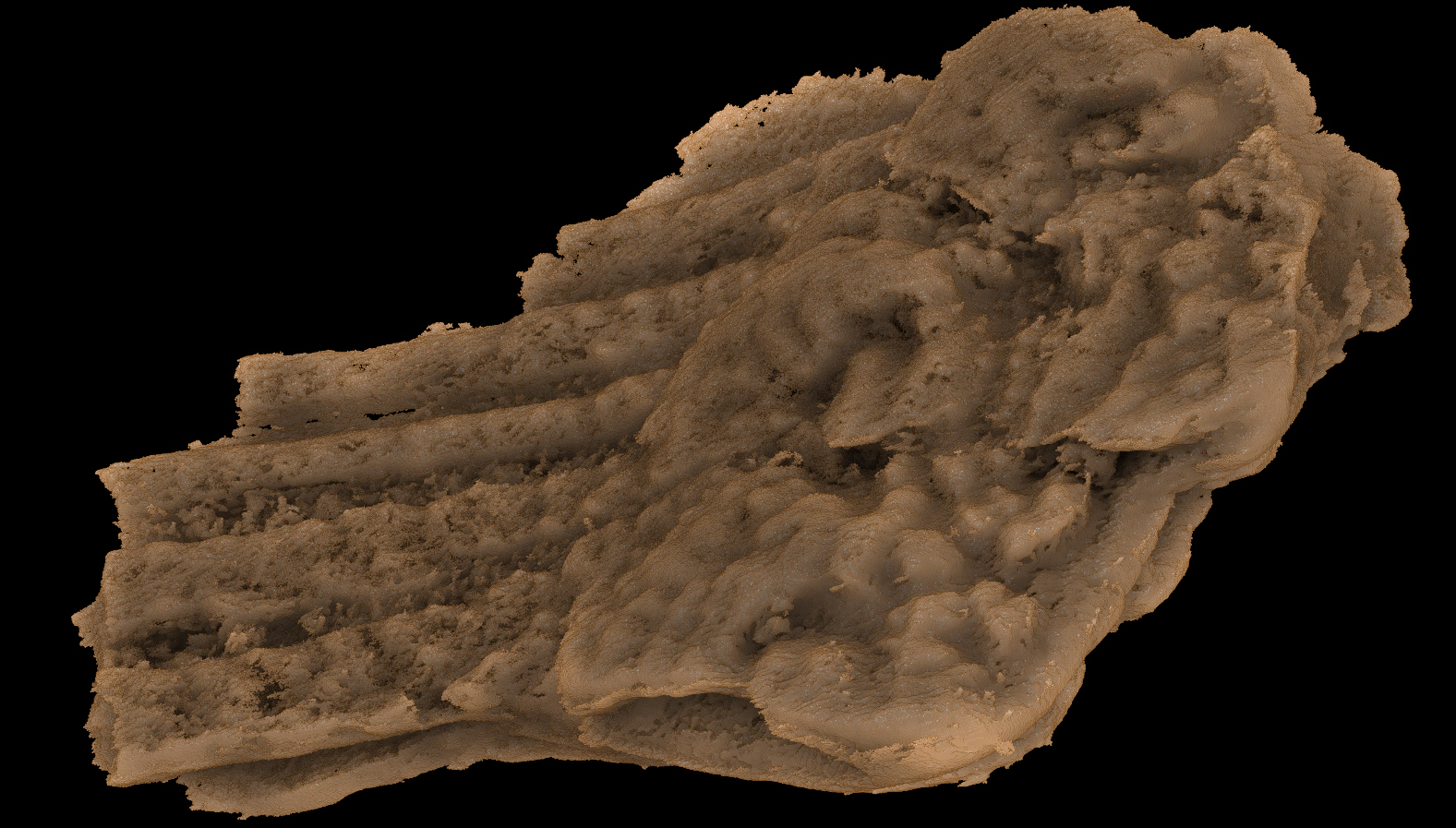
Fanjingshania, climatiid spiny shark from the lower Silurian (Aeronian) described from disarticulated dermoskeletal elements

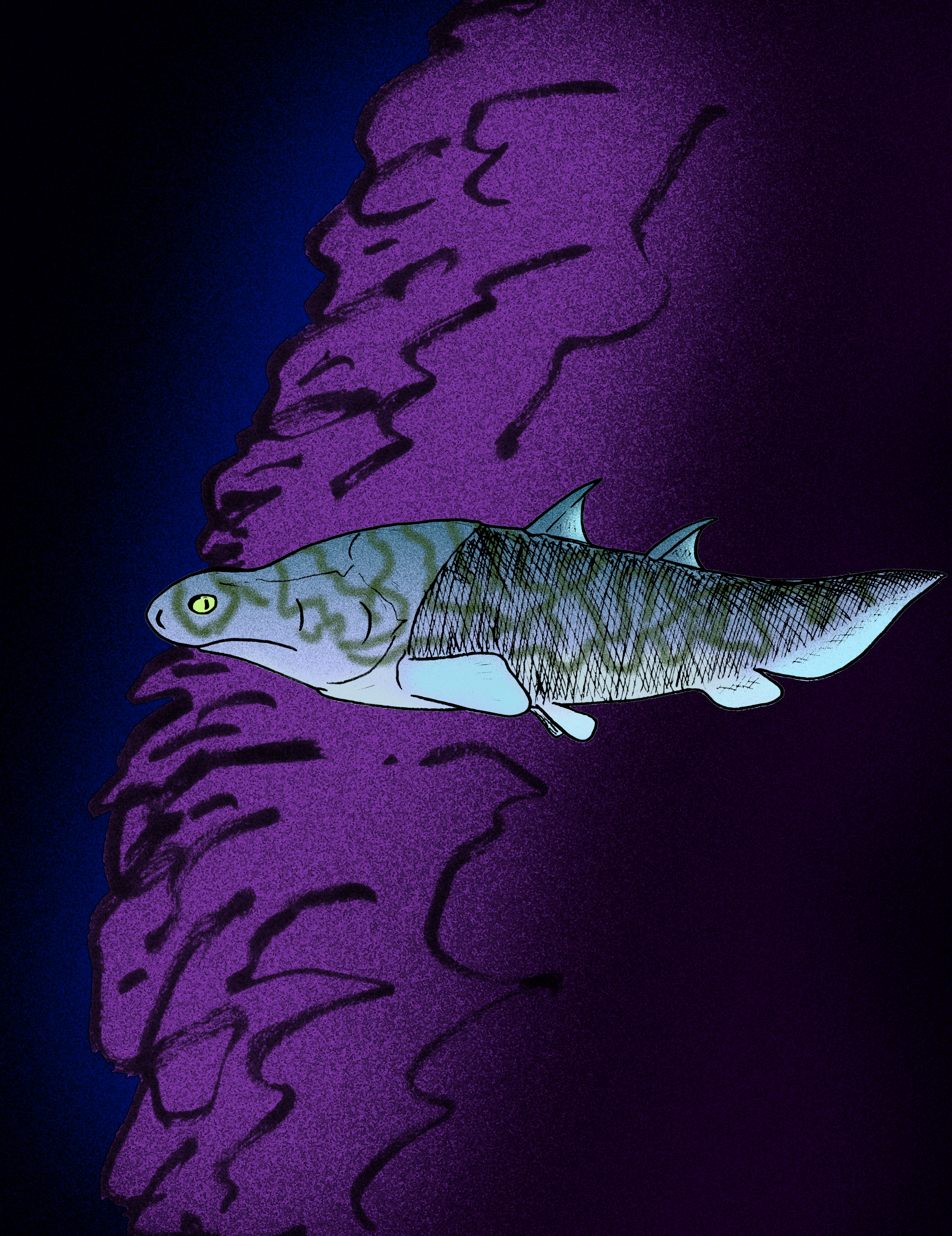
Shenacanthus is a jawed stem-chondrichthyan genus from the early Silurian (Telychian) of China.

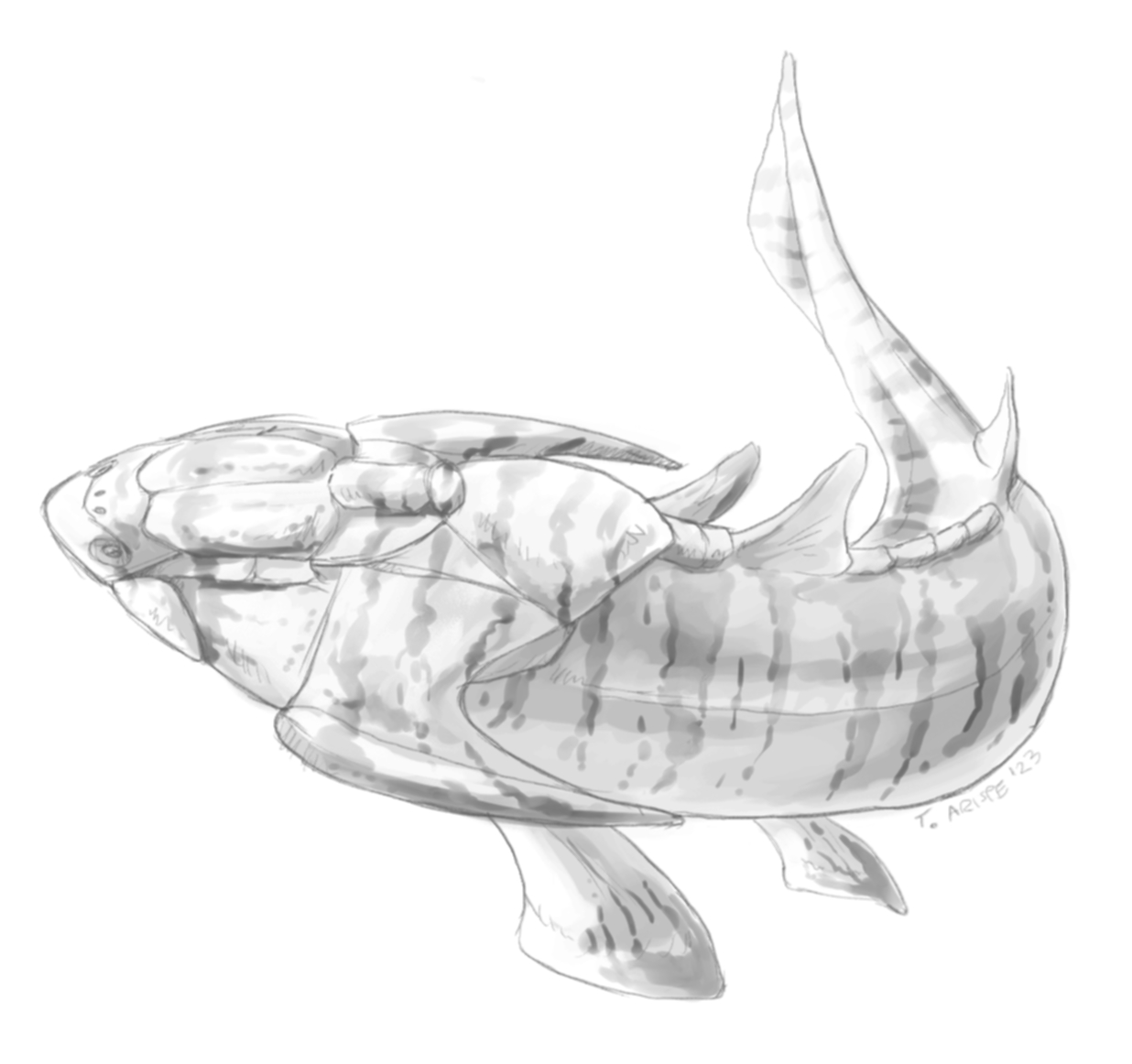
Xiushanosteus is the oldest-known placoderm from the early Silurian (Telychian) of China.

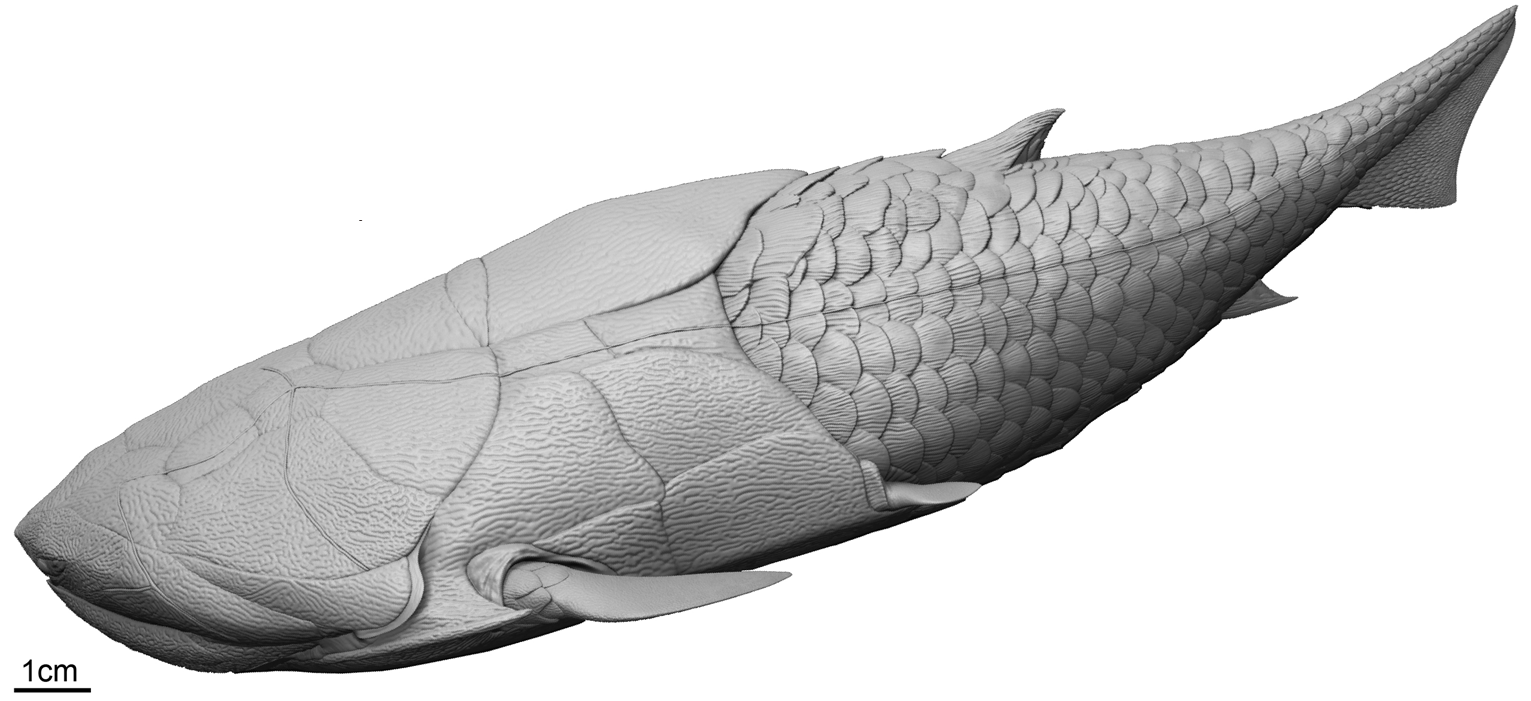
Entelognathus primordialis was a Placoderm fish from the late Silurian.

== See also ==
- Acacus Sandstone
