= Mulde event =

Anoxic event causing mass extinctions during the Silurian period

Subdivision of the Silurian Period
← / Lau event; ← / Mulde event; ← / Ireviken event
Subdivision of the Silurian according to the ICS, as of 2024. Vertical axis scale: Millions of years ago

The Mulde event was an anoxic event, and marked the second of three^{1} relatively minor mass extinctions (the Ireviken, Mulde, and Lau events) during the Silurian period. It coincided with a global drop in sea level, and is closely followed by an excursion in geochemical isotopes. Its onset is synchronous with the deposition of the Fröjel Formation in Gotland. Perceived extinction in the conodont fauna, however, likely represent a change in the depositional environment of sedimentary sequences rather than a genuine biological extinction.

Higher resolution δ^{13}C isotope analysis identifies differences in the organic and carbonate carbon isotope curves (Δ^{13}C), allowing the inference of a sustained drop in CO_{2} levels coincident with the extinction once sedimentological data are taken into account.

== Notes ==
^1The Ireviken, Mulde, and Lau events were all closely followed by isotopic excursions.
