= Ireviken event =

First of three relatively minor extinction events during the Silurian period

Subdivision of the Silurian Period
← / Lau event; ← / Mulde event; ← / Ireviken event
Subdivision of the Silurian according to the ICS, as of 2024. Vertical axis scale: Millions of years ago

The Ireviken event was the first of three relatively minor extinction events (the Ireviken, Mulde, and Lau events) during the Silurian period. It occurred at the Llandovery/Wenlock boundary (mid Silurian, 432.9 ± 1.2 million years ago). The event is best recorded at Ireviken, Gotland, where over 50% of trilobite species became extinct; 80% of the global conodont species also became extinct in this interval.

== Anatomy of the event ==
The event lasted around 200,000 years, spanning the base of the Wenlock epoch. It is associated with a period of global cooling.

It comprises eight extinction "datum points"—the first four being regularly spaced, every 30,797 years, and linked to the Milankovic obliquity cycle. The fifth and sixth probably reflect maxima in the precessional cycles, with periods of around 16.5 and 19 ka. The final two data are much further spaced, so harder to link with Milankovic changes.

== Casualties ==
The mechanism responsible for the event originated in the deep oceans, and made its way into the shallower shelf seas. Correspondingly, shallow-water reefs were barely affected, while pelagic and hemipelagic organisms such as the graptolites, conodonts and trilobites were hit hardest.

== Geochemistry ==
Subsequent to the first extinctions, excursions in the δ^{13}C and δ^{18}O records are observed; δ^{13}C rises from +1.4‰ to +4.5‰, while δ^{18}O increases from −5.6‰ to −5.0‰.

== See also ==
- Anoxic event
