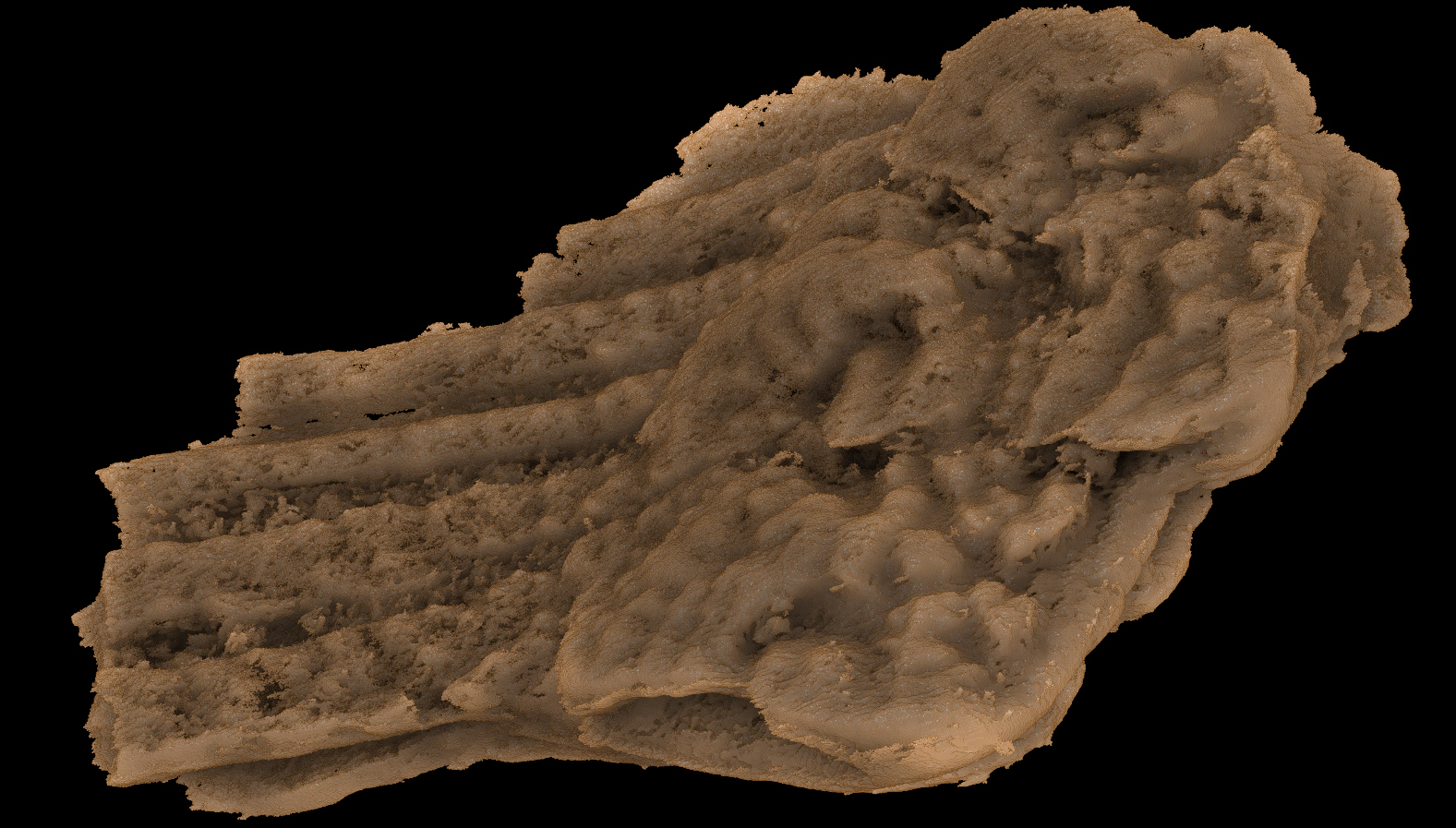
- Fossil specimen, pectoral girdle

Scientific classification
- Kingdom: Animalia
- Phylum: Chordata
- Class: Chondrichthyes
- Subclass: †Acanthodii
- Order: †Climatiiformes
- Genus: †Fanjingshania; Plamen S. Andreev, 2022
- Species: †F. renovata

Binomial name
- †Fanjingshania renovata Plamen S. Andreev, 2022

= Fanjingshania =

Fanjingshania Temporal range: Llandovery, 439 Ma

Extinct genus of cartilaginous fishes

Fanjingshania is an extinct genus of "acanthodian" stem-chondrichthyans from the lower Silurian (late Aeronian, Llandovery Epoch) of China around 439 million years old, making it currently the oldest known acanthodian. It comprises a single species, Fanjingshania renovata which is known from over 1,000 isolated elements, including fin spines, branchiostegal plates, sclerotic plates, trunk scales, and tectal and postorbital tesserae. No teeth were ascribed to the taxon, but in the same horizon the tooth taxon Qianodus was found, and these taxa may be synonymous. In a phylogenetic analysis accompanying the description, it was placed in a clade with Climatius, Parexus, and Ptomacanthus.
