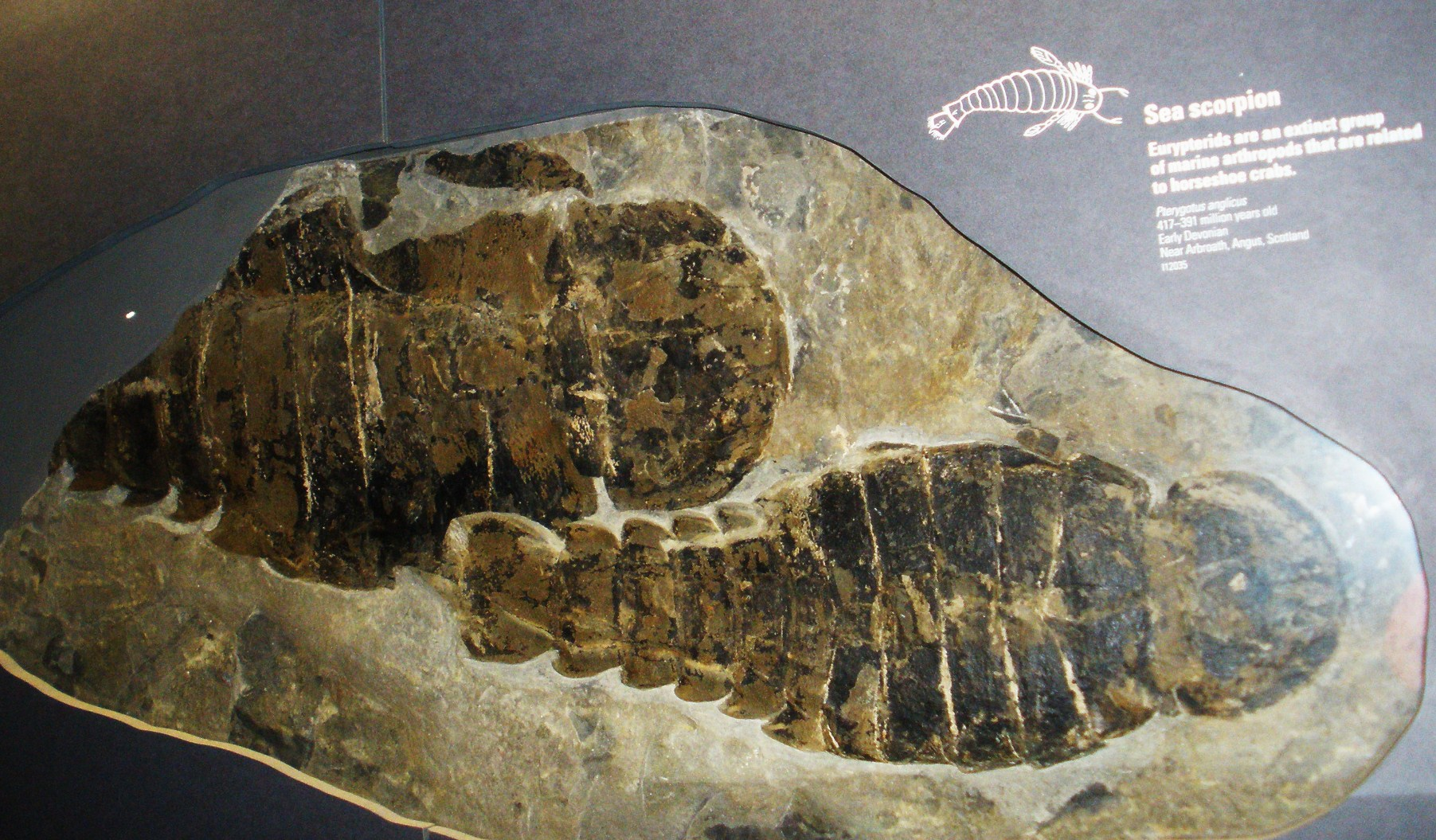
- Fossils of P. anglicus

Scientific classification
- Kingdom: Animalia
- Phylum: Arthropoda
- Subphylum: Chelicerata
- Order: †Eurypterida
- Superfamily: †Pterygotioidea
- Family: †Pterygotidae
- Genus: †Pterygotus; Agassiz, 1839

Type species
- †Pterygotus anglicus Agassiz, 1849

Species
- 13 valid species: †P. anglicus Agassiz, 1849; †P. arcuatus Salter, 1859; †P. barrandei Semper, 1898; †P. carmani Kjellesvig-Waering, 1961; †P. cobbi Hall, 1859; †P. denticulatus Kjellesvig-Waering, 1961; †P. floridanus Kjellesvig-Waering, 1950; †P. gaspesiensis Russell, 1953; †?P. grandidentatus Kjellesvig-Waering, 1961; †P. kopaninensis Barrande, 1872; †P. ludensis Salter, 1859; †P. wanggaii Ma et al., 2023.; 6 dubious species: †?P. australis McCoy, 1899; †?P. formosus (Dawson, 1861); †P. nobilis Barrande, 1872; †P. siemiradzkii Strand, 1926; †P. taurinus Salter, 1868; †?P. vernonensis Ruedemann, 1921

Synonyms
- Genus synonymy: Curviramus Ruedemann, 1935; Synonyms of P. anglicus: P. atlanticus Clarke & Ruedemann, 1912; P. minor Woodward, 1864; Synonyms of P. barrandei: P. beraunensis Semper, 1898; Synonyms of P. carmani: Erettopterus serratus Kjellesvig-Waering, 1961

= Pterygotus =

Pterygotus Temporal range: Ludlow–Givetian

Extinct genus of eurypterid

Pterygotus is an extinct genus of giant predatory eurypterid, a group of extinct aquatic arthropods. Fossils of Pterygotus have been discovered in deposits ranging in age from Middle Silurian to Late Devonian, and have been referred to several different species. Fossils have been recovered from five continents; Australia, Asia, Europe, North America and South America, which indicates that Pterygotus might have had a nearly cosmopolitan (worldwide) distribution. The type species, P. anglicus, was described by Swiss naturalist Louis Agassiz in 1839, who gave it the name Pterygotus, meaning "winged one". Agassiz mistakenly believed the remains were of a giant fish; he would only realize the mistake five years later in 1844.

Pterygotus was among the largest eurypterids. Isolated fossil remains of a large chelicera (frontal appendage) suggests that the largest known species, P. grandidentatus, reached a body length of 1.75 metres (5.7 ft). Several other species, notably P. anglicus at 1.6 metres (5.2 ft) was similarly gigantic. Pterygotus was surpassed in size by other giant eurypterids. Acutiramus was able to surpass 2 metres (6.6 ft), and Jaekelopterus could reach 2.6 metres (8.5 ft). Many species were considerably smaller than the largest species, such as P. kopaninensis at 50 centimetres (20 in). Pterygotus may have weighed around 30 kilogramms.

Like its close relative Jaekelopterus, Pterygotus was a large and active predator noted for its robust and enlarged cheliceral claws that would have allowed it to puncture and grasp prey and a visual acuity (clarity of vision) comparable to that of modern predatory arthropods.

== Description ==
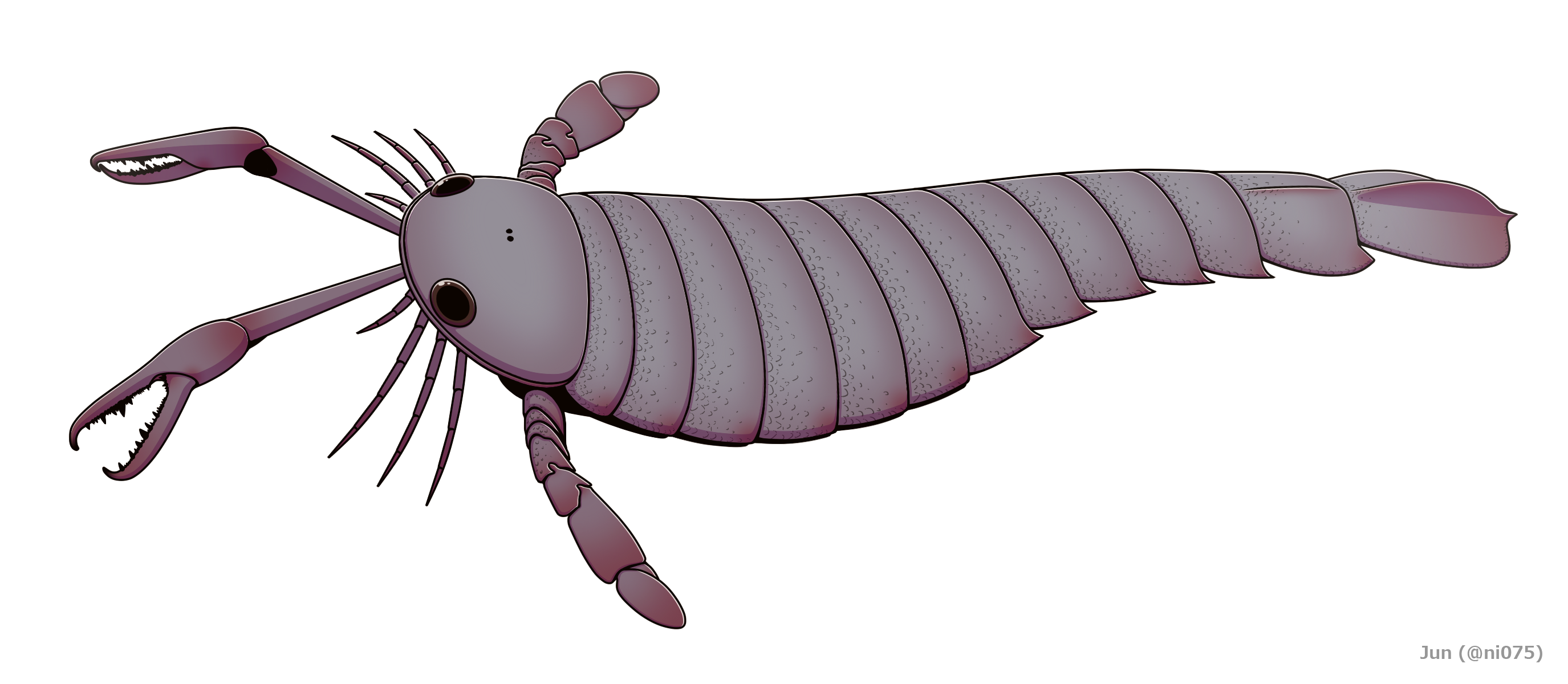
Life restoration of P. anglicus.

With the largest species, P. grandidentatus, reaching a body length of 1.75 metres (5.7 ft), Pterygotus was among the largest known eurypterids to have existed, though some of its close relatives (such as Acutiramus and Jaekelopterus) surpassed it in length. Though there were a few gigantic species, many species were considerably smaller in size. The smallest species, P. kopaninensis, measured just 50 centimetres (20 in) in length.

Pterygotus is classified as part of the pterygotid family of eurypterids, to which it lends its name, a group of highly derived eurypterids of the Silurian to Devonian periods that differ from other groups by a number of features, perhaps most prominently in the chelicerae (the first pair of limbs) and the telson (the posteriormost division of the body). The chelicerae of the Pterygotidae were enlarged and robust, clearly adapted to be used for active prey capture and more similar to the claws of some modern crustaceans, with well developed teeth on the claws, than to the chelicerae of other eurypterid groups. Unlike most of the rest of the body, which was covered in a scale-like ornamentation like other pterygotid eurypterids, the claws lacked any type of ornamentation. Additionally, the end points of the claws were round and curved unlike the sharp points present at the ends of the claws of the related Erettopterus. The pterygotid telsons were flattened and expanded, likely used as rudders when swimming. Their walking legs were small and slender, without spines, and they were likely not capable of walking on land.

Pterygotus is distinguishable from other pterygotids by the curved distal margin of the chelae (claws). The prosoma (head) is subtrapezoidal (a trapezoid with rounded corners), with compound eyes located near the edge of the front corners. The telson has a pronounced dorsal carina (or keel) running down its center, terminating in a short spine.

=== Size ===
The size of the largest (P. grandidentatus) and smallest (P. kopaninensis) species of Pterygotus compared to a human.

The Pterygotidae includes the largest known arthropods to have ever lived, with several species surpassing two metres in length (such as Jaekelopterus rhenaniae at 2.5 metres (8.2 ft) and Acutiramus bohemicus at 2.1 metres (6.9 ft)). Though Pterygotus was not the largest of the pterygotids, several species were large, surpassing 1 metre (3.3 ft) in length.

The largest known species was P. grandidentatus, with the largest known isolated chelicerae fragments suggesting a length of 1.75 metres (5.7 ft). P. anglicus, the type species, grew to 1.6 metres (5.2 ft) in length, based on a large tergite discovered by Henry Woodward at some point between 1866 and 1878. Measuring just over 40 centimetres (16 in) in length and 10.5 centimetres (4.1 in) in width, the tergite suggests a eurypterid with a full length of 1.6 metres (5.2 ft) from the beginning of the carapace to the end of the telson, if the extended chelicerae are counted (normally they are not) the total length would exceed 2 metres (6.6 ft). P. carmani, from the Devonian of Ohio, likely reached lengths in excess of 1.5 metres (4.9 ft).

The species P. cobbi (1.4 metres (4.6 ft)), P. barrandei (1.26 metres (4.1 ft)) and P. denticulatus (1.2 metres (3.9 ft)) also exceeded 1 metre in length. Smaller species include P. floridanus at 90 centimetres (35 in), P. arcuatus at 60 centimetres (24 in), and the smallest known species, P. kopaninensis, at 50 centimetres (20 in) in length.

== History of research ==
=== Initial finds ===
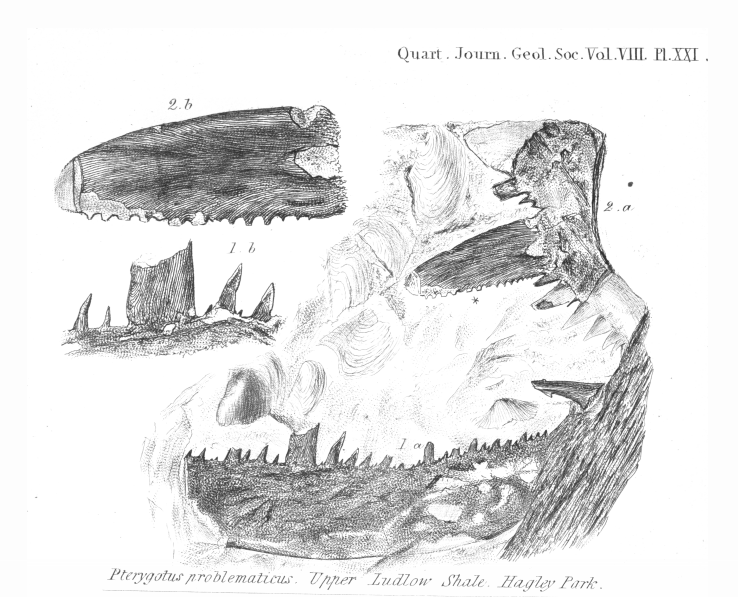
Fossils described by John William Salter as belonging to "Pterygotus problematicus" in 1852. This species is now considered a nomen vanum.

The first fossils of Pterygotus were found in deposits of Lochkovian-Pragian (Early Devonian) age by quarrymen in Scotland and western England, who referred to the large fossil remains as "Seraphims". Louis Agassiz, a Swiss-American biologist and geologist, described the fossils in 1839 and named it Pterygotus, which translates to "winged one". Agassiz believed that they were the fossil remains of a large fish. The specimens described by Agassiz from England were referred to a species he dubbed Pterygotus problematicus. Agassiz first recognized the true nature of the fossils as arthropod remains five years later in 1844 after having examined more complete fossils recovered in the Old Red Sandstone of Scotland. Although recognizing the fossils of Pterygotus as arthropod was closer to its modern phylogenetical position, Agassiz would consider Pterygotus to represent a crustacean of the Entomostraca subclass. Although Frederick M'Coy did note that Pterygotus resembled the Limulidae and the previously discovered eurypterid Eurypterus in 1849, he classified both Eurypterus and Pterygotus as crustaceans.

The new Scottish fossils were named as the species P. anglicus in 1849, which remains the most extensively known species of Pterygotus, distinguished from subsequently discovered species by possessing curved terminal teeth and the primary and intermediate teeth being inclined slightly backwards.

P. problematicus was also used as the designation for an incomplete chelicera discovered in the Welsh Borderland of western England by John William Salter in 1852 but is in modern times considered a nomen vanum ("baseless name") as the species is impossible to define. The fossil material with which it was described is undiagnostic and insufficient to establish any meaningful characteristics and as such many fragmentary pterygotid fossils have been referred to it throughout its long history, rendering it effectively synonymous with the family Pterygotidae. More often than not, these fragments consist of patches of pterygotid integument preserving the scale-like ornamentation characteristic of the group which researchers have wrongfully believed was characteristic of only Pterygotus or P. problematicus. As such ornamentation is known from every pterygotid genus it can not be used as a diagnostic feature of a single species. Though P. problematicus is the earliest name used for a species of Pterygotus, it is not considered the type species as the name is no longer in use. Instead P. anglicus, based on a number of diagnostic features and properly illustrated in its description by Agassiz in 1844, is considered the type species of Pterygotus.

Two further species that remain assigned to the genus to this day would be described from England during the 19th century; P. ludensis of Pridoli (Late Silurian) age and P. arcuatus of Ludlow (Late Silurian) age, along with a North American species, P. cobbi, from the Pridoli of the United States and Canada. P. arcuatus was originally described from a syntypic series (a series of specimens out of which a particular holotype is not designated) of fossil remains by John William Salter, containing five separate fossil specimens. In 1961, 102 years after its description, Erik N. Kjellesvig-Waering noted that only one of these specimens (Number 89587 of the Geological Survey and Museum of London, a free ramus of a chelicera) might truly be referrable to this distinct species as the other fossils (tergites, coxae and indeterminable fragments) might actually represent fossils of other species due to not being diagnostic enough. P. ludensis, described by Salter in 1859, can be distinguished from other species by the more developed and prolonged keel (or ridge) running along the center of the telson from its beginning to the tail spike.

The rare species P. cobbi, described by James Hall in 1859 based on fossils recovered in New York, USA, was the first species of Pterygotus to be described from outside of Scotland and expanded the known range of the genus considerably. Hall described this new species alongside two other North American species; P. macrophthalmus (now referred to Acutiramus) and P. osborni (later synonymized with P. macrophthalmus). The distal tooth of the free ramus (the part of the claw that moves) was less prominent than in other species, which has been noted as similar to the distal tooth in the free ramus of Acutiramus cummingsi. Although P. cobbi is based on poor fossil material, only known from a free ramus, it remains recognized as a distinct species on the account of being more similar to certain species discovered in the Czech Republic (such as P. barrandei) than it is to other pterygotid species discovered in the P. cobbi locality (such as Acutiramus macrophthalmus).

=== Creation of subgenera and the Pterygotidae ===
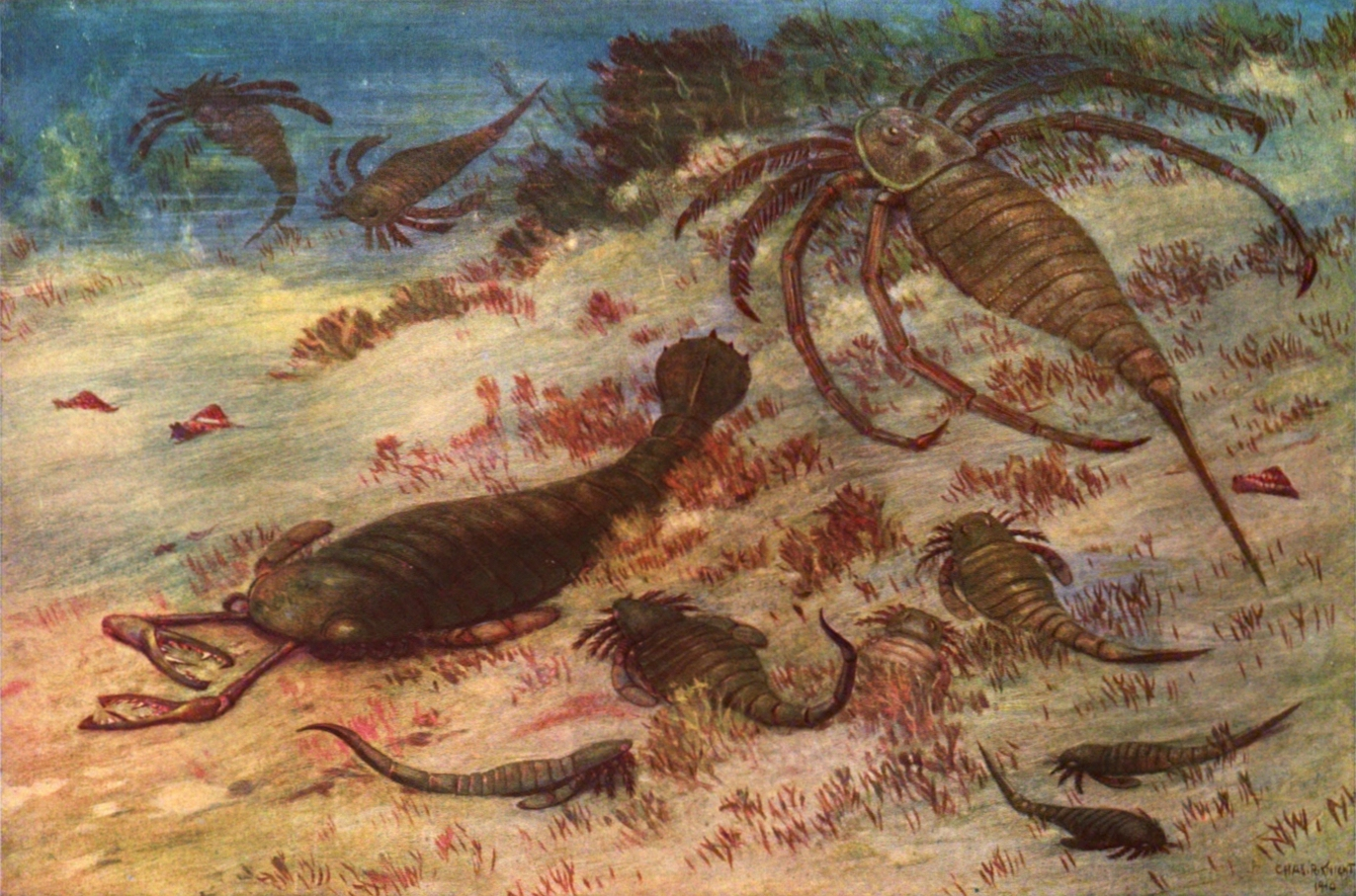
Painting painted in 1912 by Charles R. Knight depicting various eurypterids discovered in New York. The painting includes Dolichopterus, Eusarcana, Stylonurus, Eurypterus and Hughmilleria. Pterygotus can be seen in the center-left.

By 1859, 10 species had been assigned to the genus, and John William Salter recognized that it was possible to divide these species into subgenera based on the morphology of the telsons. Salter erected the subgenus Pterygotus (Erettopterus) for species with a bilobed telson. Further subgenera would be named as more differences were noted between the species, such subgenera include Pterygotus (Curviramus) and Pterygotus (Acutiramus), named in 1935 based upon features of the denticles (teeth) of the chelicerae. Pterygotus (Curviramus) was later recognized as synonymous with Pterygotus (Pterygotus) by Leif Størmer the same year, and Erettopterus and Acutiramus would be recognized as separate, but closely related, genera (Erettopterus by Erik N. Kjellesvig-Waering in 1961, and Acutiramus by Størmer in 1974).

In 1912, the family Pterygotidae was erected by John Mason Clarke & Rudolf Ruedemann in 1912 to include the eurypterid genera Pterygotus, Slimonia, Hughmilleria and Hastimima. The three latter genera would be reclassified as members of the Hughmilleriidae by Erik N. Kjellesvig-Waering in 1951, leaving Pterygotus and its former subgenera as the sole pterygotid eurypterids.

=== Further discoveries ===
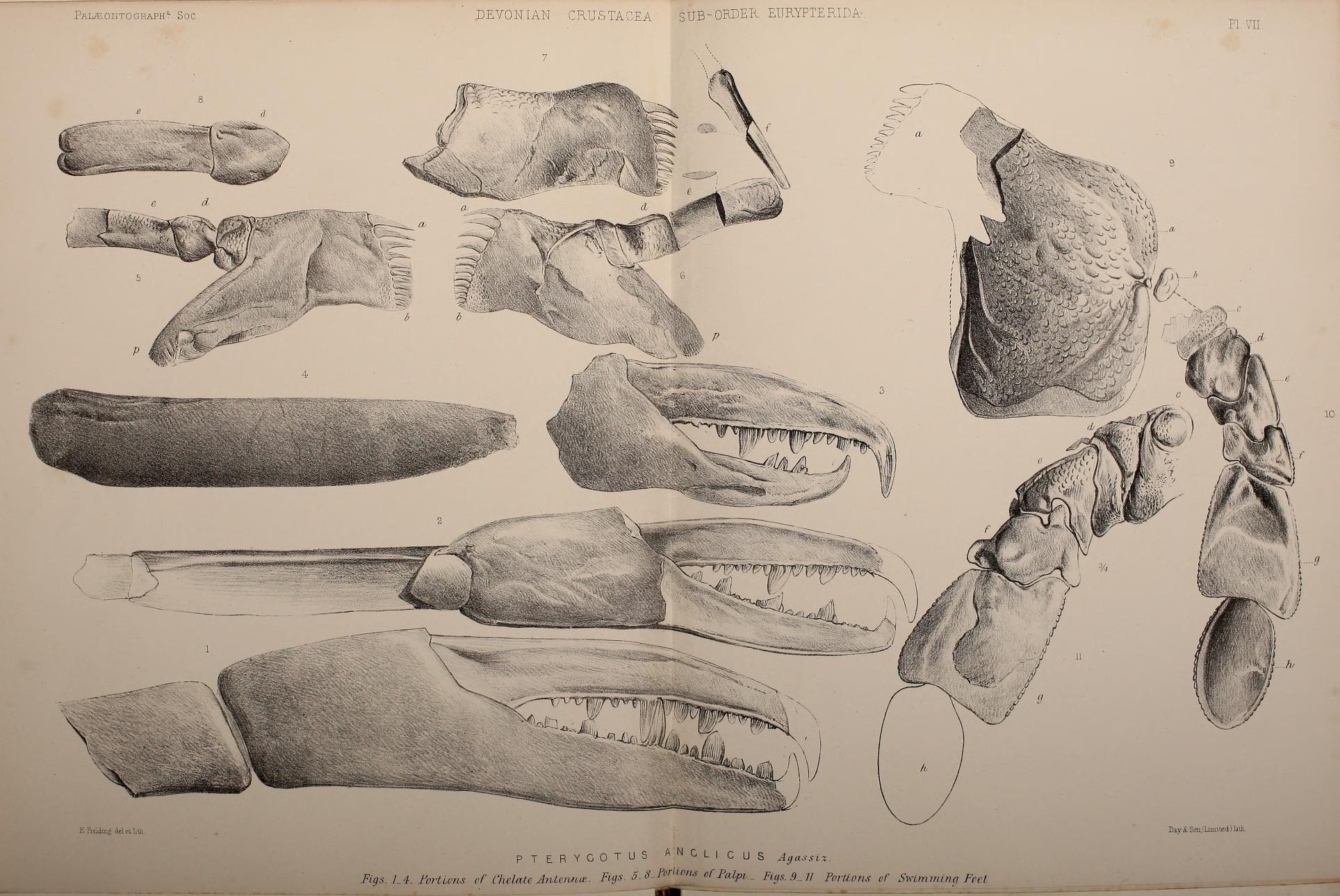
Illustration of fossils of P. anglicus, including three cheliceral claws.

Though early discoveries of Pterygotus were confined to England and North America, fossil finds throughout the 20th century would help establish that Pterygotus as a genus achieved a nearly cosmopolitan distribution. The first eurypterid to be discovered in Australia was Pterygotus australis, whose fossils were found in the Ludlow age Melbourne Group of the Dargile Formation. The fossils referred to P. australis, consisting of four fragments making up about half of a segment that were discovered during the process of excavations beneath Melbourne during the construction of new drainage works for the city in 1899. The fragmentary fossils closely resemble fossils of Erettopterus bilobus (classified as a species of Pterygotus at the time), which might make their assignment to Pterygotus questionable. In 2020, the species was marked as a nomen dubium (a dubious species) due to the lack of sufficient diagnostic material to separate P. australis from the rest of the pterygotids.

Kjellesvig-Waering named the species P. bolivianus in 1964 based on fossils recovered from deposits of Emsian-Eifelian (Early to Middle Devonian) age in Bolivia. This species was the first pterygotid to be discovered in South America, the first Devonian pterygotid to be recovered in deposits in the Southern Hemisphere and also represents one of the last known living member of the pterygotid family. The specimen (PE6173, housed at the Chicago Natural History Museum) includes the well-preserved anterior half of a chelicera and ramus. The tooth of the ramus are short, wide and conical, all being slightly curved backwards. The terminal tooth is larger, but only slightly, than the tooth succeeding it and the inwards bend of the claw suggests that another tooth might be present, creating a kind of "double tooth combination" that is also present in some other species, such as P. lightbodyi, P. impacatus and Erettopterus brodiei. The total length of the fossilized ramus is 2.35 cm (1 in), but it likely only represents around half of the full ramus. As in other species (and the Pterygotidae in general), the teeth are finely ribbed. It can be distinguished from all other species of Pterygotus by the wide but short and evenly sized teeth as well as the terminal tooth not having any particular development. In 2019, a new fragmentary ramus of a chelicera was found in the Cuche Formation of Colombia. The specimen (SGC-MGJRG.2018.I.5), assigned with uncertainty to P. bolivianus due to similarities with its holotype, represents the first eurypterid of Colombia and the fourth of South America. The fossil was dated as Frasnian (Late Devonian), suggesting that Pterygotus did not become extinct during the Middle Devonian as previously thought. In 2022, the original P. bolivianus specimen was shown to actually have been the jaw of the co-occurring chondrichthyan fish Pucapampella. The 2019 specimen was shown to be from an arthropod, though it could not be demonstrated to actually be an eurypterid.

Following close examination and the discovery of new fossil evidence, further genera would be split off from Pterygotus. P. rhenaniae was classified as part of its own genus, Jaekelopterus, by Charles D. Waterston in 1964. He considered the species sufficiently distinct from other Pterygotus species due to its supposedly segmented genital appendage (a feature later realized to be wrong), its narrow and long chelicerae, and its primary teeth being angled slightly anteriorly. Another species, P. ventricosus, was classified as the separate genus Ciurcopterus in 2007 by O. Erik Tetlie and Derek E. G. Briggs, distinguished primarily by sharing several features with more basal pterygotioid eurypterids, such as its appendages being similar to those of Slimonia.

==== Discoveries in Europe ====
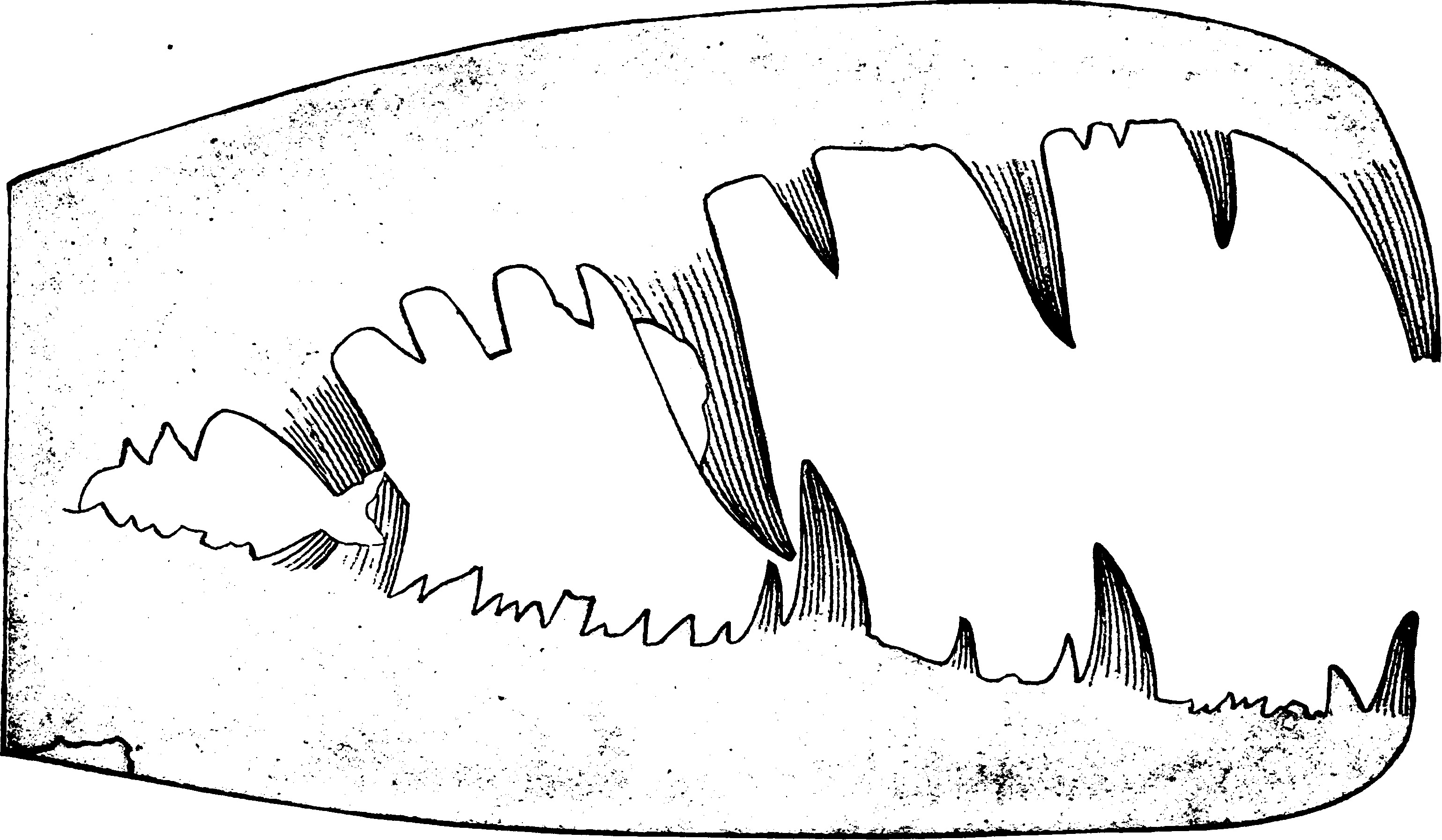
Cheliceral claw of P. barrandei.

New fossil finds also revealed the presence of Pterygotus in several European countries where it had previously been unknown and established it as a highly taxonomically diverse genus. P. barrandei was named in 1898 and has fossil representation in Pridoli age deposits of the Czech Republic. P. barrandei is noted to be very similar to P. cobbi, and a close relation between the two species is assumed. Despite many similarities, the two species do have some differences, most prominently in the cheliceral teeth of the free rami. The largest tooth of the free ramus of P. barrandei is significantly longer than the corresponding tooth in P. cobbi and the teeth of the free ramus of P. barrandei are directed forwards more prominently in general. Fossils of P. barrandei are rare, with fossil finds being confined to a handful of formations of Pridoli age in Bohemia. Known fossils include some incomplete chelicerae and a metastoma. Some additional fossil remains have been assigned to the species, consisting of coxae and a genital appendage, but their assignment to the species is doubtful.

The species P. nobilis, described in 1872, is based on a small and fragmentary chelicera found in what today is the Czech Republic. The arrangement of teeth seen in this claw, though most teeth are not preserved, was noted by researcher Max Semper in 1897 as sharing little to no resemblance with what is seen in the type species of Pterygotus, P. anglicus, and was noted to in fact be more similar to what is seen in P. buffaloensis and P. bohemicus. Today P. buffaloensis is considered a junior synonym of P. bohemicus, which has been reclassified as part of the closely related genus Acutiramus. The fragmentary remains of P. nobilis makes further studies of its precise identity difficult, Semper suggested that it may be synonymous with Acutiramus bohemicus, but noted that the "questions [about its identity] can not be answered from the material available to me". In 1994, P. nobilis was considered to be a nomen nudum.

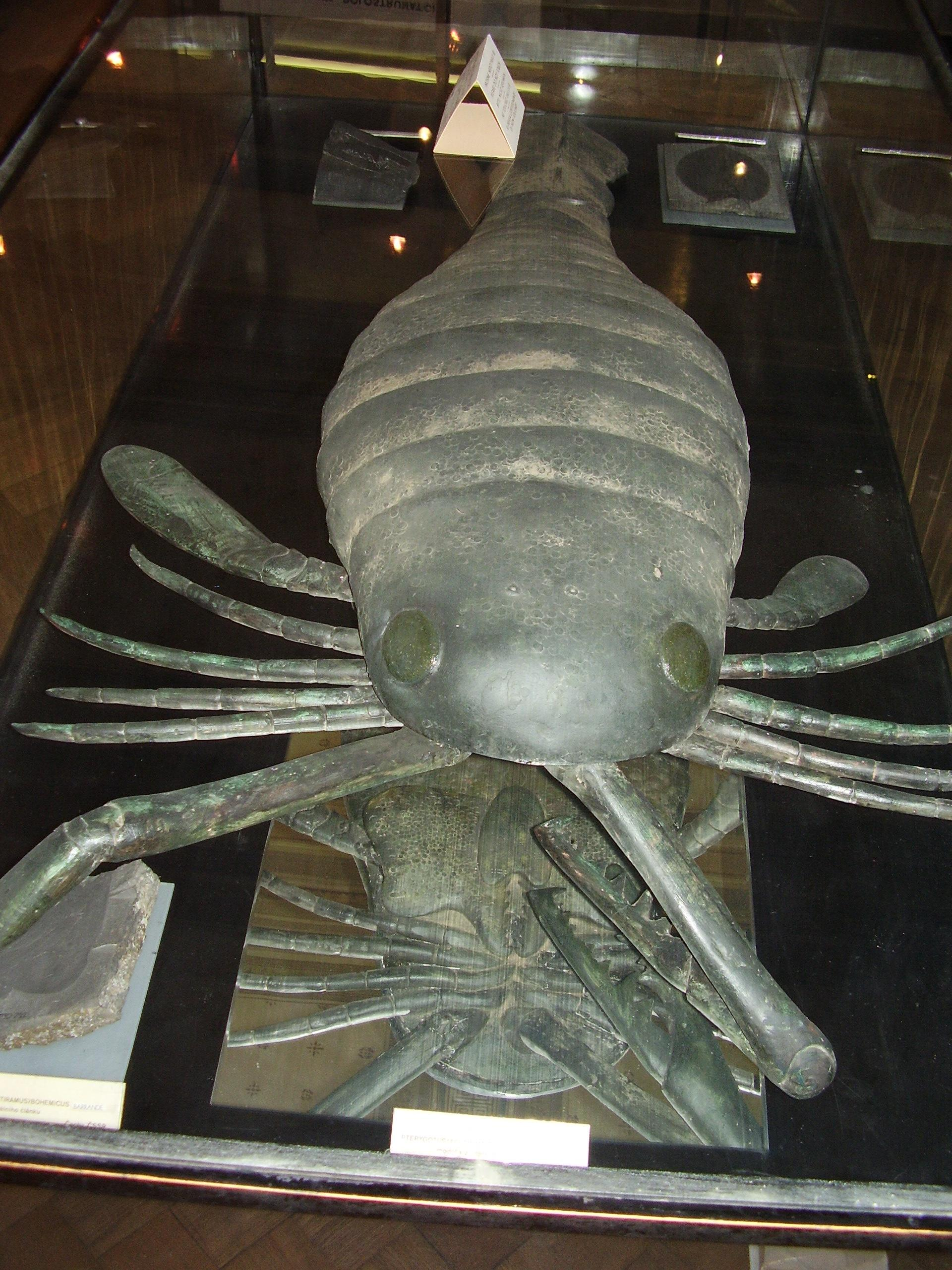
Pterygotus model in the Czech National Museum, Prague.

Another species, P. kopaninensis, also named in 1872, is known from a single and incomplete fixed cheliceral ramus (specimen number L1396) recovered from the Kopanina Formation around the village of Zadní Kopanina, located in Prague. The specimen measures 4.3 cm (1.7 in) in length and was at one point assigned to Erettopterus due to the "peculiar hook-like termination of the ramus", a feature now known to be present due to a remnant of the free ramus being present in the fossil. The tooth pattern and shape of the claw suggests that an assignment to Pterygotus is more likely.

P. siemiradzkii, described by Embrik Strand in 1926 based on fossil material from western Ukraine, is based on highly fragmentary material with little diagnostic value. The single specimen designated as P. siemiradzkii, a telson, has unusual and pronounced ridges that are not seen in any known species of Pterygotus, nor in any other genus of pterygotid eurypterids, which makes its assignment to Pterygotus questionable.

In 1964, two species described by Kjellesvig-Waering increased the known range of Pterygotus to Scotland (P. lanarkensis) and Estonia (P. impacatus), both Ludlow in age. P. lanarkensis was the second pterygotid to be discovered from the well known eurypterid fauna of Lesmahagow in Lanarkshire, Scotland. As pterygotids commonly occur in association with multiple related genera, it was considered unusual that there was only one species, Erettopterus bilobus, present in Lesmahagow. Fossil remains of P. lanarkensis had been known since 1868 (first collected by Robert Slimon in 1855–1860), but were first recognized as such by Kjellesvig-Waering in 1964. Represented by a large chelicera (specimen number 53890 in the British Museum of Natural History) originally doubtfully referred to Erettopterus bilobus, P. lanarkensis more closely resembles P. anglicus than it does species of Erettopterus. The terminal tooth (broken in this specimen) is 0.9 cm in length and the central tooth is unusually short. The combination of an unusually long terminal tooth and an underdeveloped central tooth differentiates P. lanarkensis from other species of Pterygotus. Several features distinguish it from the Erettopterus that it was found associated with, including the more robust chelicerae of P. lanarkensis.

P. impacatus, recovered from deposits of Ludlow age at Kielkond in Saaremaa, Estonia, is represented by a holotype specimen consisting of a fragmentary free ramus of a chelicera that preserves some diagnostic and well-preserved details (specimen number 7059/7 housed in the Museum of Comparative Zoology). Alongside this specimen, important specimens referred to the species include the paratype (No. 7059/3, a fragmentary chelicera). This specimen includes several of the features that are diagnostic of P. impacatus, such as upright teeth following the thick and long teeth of the terminal part of the claw. Particularly of diagnostic value is that there are teeth present at the point where the terminal teeth first begin. The central tooth of the free ramus is unusually large in this species. The terminal tooth measures 2.3 cm (1 in) in length. The rami of P. impacatus are ornamented with large and pointed pustules (elevations in the skin), and this feature helps distinguish specimens of P. impacatus from other pterygotids in the fossil sites where its remains are found. In 2007, O. Erik Tetlie cast doubt on the assignment of P. impacatus to Pterygotus as the shape of the eyes and carapace was similar to how these body parts are shaped in Erettopterus. P. impacatus was later designated a synonym of Erettopterus osiliensis.

===== England =====
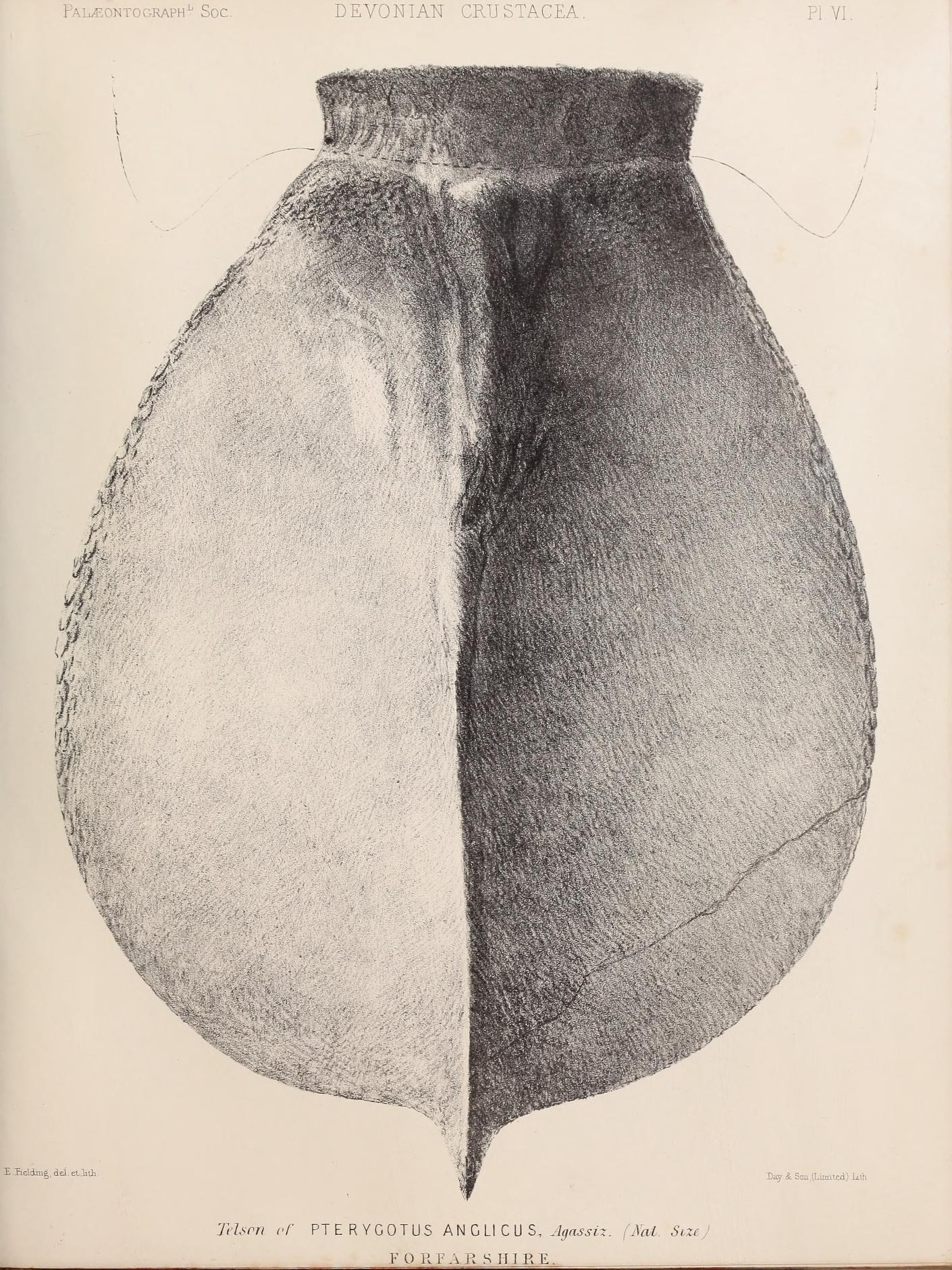
Telson of P. anglicus.

England, the site of the initial discovery of P. problematicus, has provided fossils for several additional species. Kjellesvig-Waering named three new species from England in 1961; P. denticulatus, P. lightbodyi (both Late Ludlow in age) and P. grandidentatus (Wenlock, Late Silurian, in age). P. denticulatus is known from a single specimen (No. 48393 of the British Museum of Natural History) includes about half of the anterior end of what is presumed to be a fixed ramus of a chelicera. The claw is stout, with unusually short teeth that are faintly ribbed. This partial ramus measures 1.4 cm (0.5 in) in length and was discovered at Whitcliffe in Shropshire, England associated with fossils of brachiopods and cephalopods. Though it is sometimes considered synonymous with P. lightbodyi, P. denticulatus can be distinguished by the small, thick and curved teeth of its claws, differing not only from P. lightbodyi in this respect, but virtually all other species of Pterygotus as well.

P. lightbodyi is named in honor of Robert Lightbody, a British amateur geologist who made valuable contributions to paleontological research on the early Paleozoic of the Welsh Borderland, including the discovery of important Silurian fossils (such as eurypterids), in the 1800s. This species was one of the most common eurypterid in England during the Ludlow epoch and was quite large and clearly distinct (though it resembles P. barrandei, P. floridanus and P. cobbi in its cheliceral morphology) from other species of the genus, being known from multiple specimens. The most important fossils of P. lightbodyi include the holotype (consisting of most of a chelicera) and two paratypes (including most of the free ramus). The claws of P. lightbodyi are all equipped with vertically placed and very long teeth, most of which curve slightly backwards. The terminal tooth is unusually slender and long in P. lightbodyi, and as with the other teeth slightly curved backwards. Among the more important diagnostic features of the species is the combination of a large terminal tooth and a large upright tooth near it.

P. grandidentatus is known from a single specimen, the anterior half of a free ramus of a chelicera discovered in the Wenlock-aged beds at Dudley in Worcestershire, England (specimen number I. 3163 in the British Museum of Natural History). It is notable for the stout stem and the unusually long length (1.75 cm, 0.7 in) of the terminal tooth and the unusual thickness of its base. P. grandidentatus can easily be distinguished from other species not only be its unusual terminal tooth, but also by the disoriented teeth along the claw, being bent in a variety of different directions. The terminal part of the ramus ends in an arrangement of multiple teeth otherwise only noted in the species P. waylandsmithi. As this specific part of the ramus is poorly known from other species of Pterygotus and P. waylandsmithi was reclassified as a species of Erettopterus in 2007 the assignment of P. grandidentatus to Pterygotus is questionable.

England would also yield a dubious species, P. taurinus, from deposits of Pridoli or Devonian age. Named by Salter in 1868, P. taurinus is treated as a dubious species for the reason that it is effectively a composite composed of fossils of three different eurypterids. These fossils consist of a type specimen of chelicerae (which is now lost, complicating any potential comparisons), a large carapace and chelicerae (likely actually referrable to Pterygotus due to being similar to P. anglicus), a leg (undoubtedly representing a carcinosomatid eurypterid, potentially Carcinosoma) and a telson (which is far more similar to Erettopterus than to Pterygotus). Most of these specimens have been lost since the 1870s, the last record being that they were all in the cabinet of a Dr. McCullough of Abergavenny.

==== Discoveries in North America ====
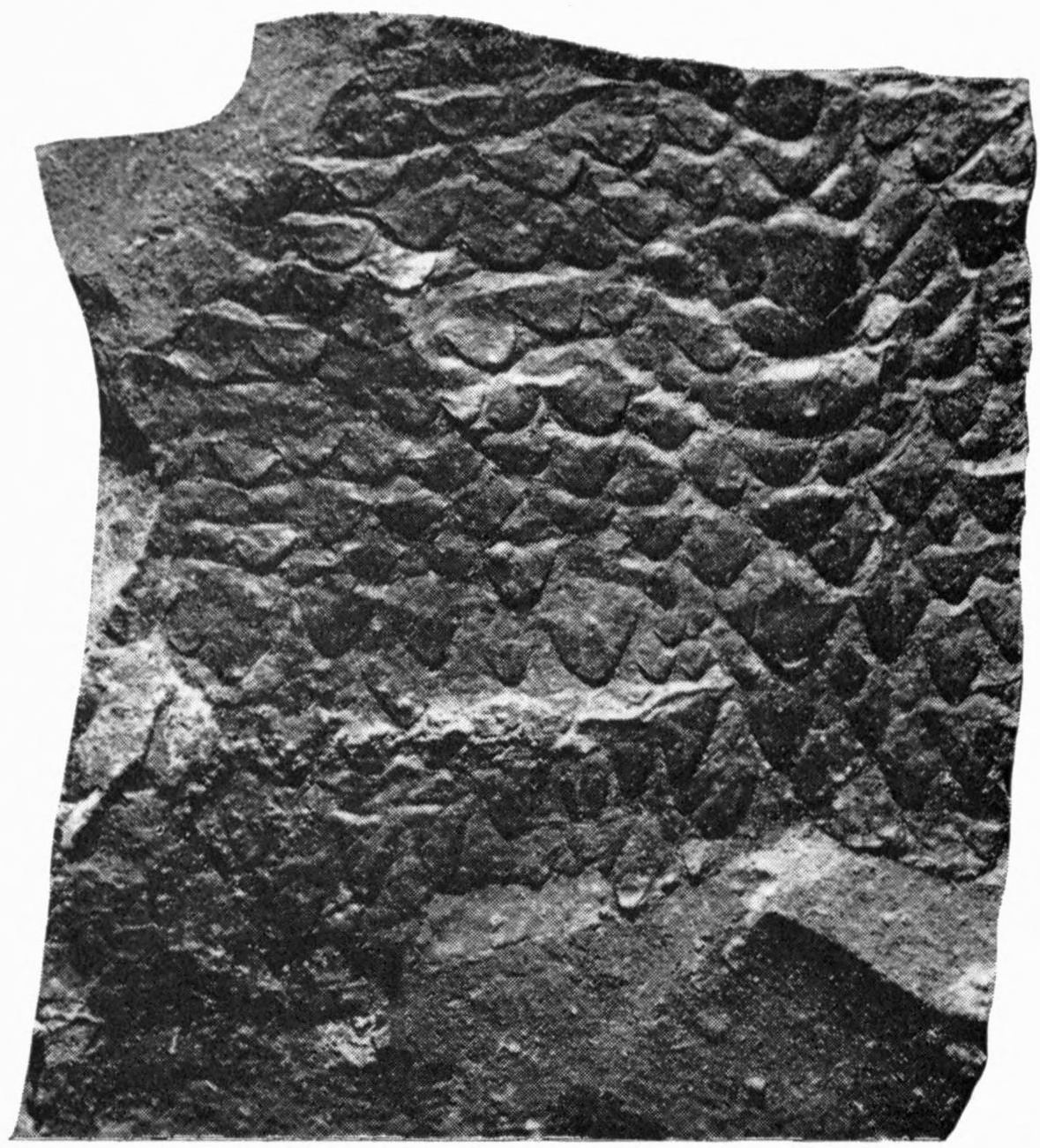
Fossil tergite of P. carmani, preserving the scale-like ornamentation characteristic of pterygotid eurypterids.

The 20th century would see the description of additional species of Pterygotus in North America as well, including the Early Devonian P. carmani (1961, USA) and P. floridanus (1950, Florida, USA) and the Middle Devonian P. gaspesiensis (1953, Quebec, Canada).

Fossil remains of pterygotid eurypterids, bearing the distinct scale-like ornamentation known from the group, had been reported from eastern Canada as early as 1846, when researcher William Edmond Logan reported the occurrence of an animal "bearing strong resemblance to Murchison's Pterygotus problematicus" in Silurian-Devonian deposits of Gaspé, Quebec. The fossils, eventually identified as being exclusively of Devonian age, were first tentatively referred to P. atlanticus (now synonymized with P. anglicus), which had been discovered in relatively close proximity to the Gaspé fossils, on the account of the P. atlanticus material being so fragmentary that it was impossible to tell whether or not they represented the same species. They were described by Loris S. Russell as belonging to the new species P. gaspesiensis in 1953.

John William Dawson in 1861 named a new species of lycopod plant, Selaginites formosus, based on alleged remains of stems and branches found at Gaspé. Salter convinced Dawson that fossils of S. formosus actually were fragmentary remains of a eurypterid, as confirmed by further findings. Dawson reclassified it as a eurypterid in 1871. Kjellesvig-Waering in 1964 assigned it as a questionable species of Pterygotus. Although the fossils preserve some cuticular scales, there are not enough diagnostic features in the P. formosus fossils to determine if it represents Pterygotus or not.

In 1921, Ruedemann described an eurypterid fauna from the Vernon Formation of Pittsford, New York. Among them, the species P. vernonensis was erected based on two small short carapaces. The outline and position of the eyes suggest an assignation to the genus Pterygotus. He suggested a relationship with Slimonia, but he did not assigned it due to the lack of more material indicative of the latter. Although it was later placed on the genus Waeringopterus, Samuel J. Ciurca, Jr. and O. Erik Tetlie concluded in 2007 that the holotype does not really have eyes and is nothing more than an incomplete body segment. Therefore, they regarded the species as a nomen dubium.

P. floridanus, recovered from deposits of Lochkovian age in Florida, extended the known range of eurypterids on the continent over 800 km (500 miles) south. Prior to its discovery, eurypterids in North America were only known from the northern parts of the continent, with New York State representing the most fossil-rich state. The remains of P. floridanus were first uncovered by G. Arthur Cooper in Suwannee County, Florida, and the fossils consist of a fixed ramus of the chelicera as well as fragments of the abdominal plates and tergites and were concluded to represent a new species of Pterygotus by Erik N. Kjellesvig-Waering in 1950. It most closely resembles P. cobbi and P. barrandei, differing from P. cobbi in its more developed central tooth and the arrangement of the smaller teeth of the claws and from P. barrandei in that P. floridanus has a more slender ramus.

P. carmani is the most commonly found eurypterid in the Lower Devonian deposits of Lucas County, Ohio. Described by Erik N. Kjellesvig-Waering in 1961 and named in honor of Dr. J. Ernest Carman of the Ohio State University, the first to discover eurypterids at the locality where the P. carmani remains were found, P. carmani is primarily known from incomplete chelicerae and gnathobases of coxae. Alongside the two coxae and three chelicerae part of its original description, known fossil remains also include a metastoma and a pretelson. All of these original fossil specimens were designated by Kjellesvig-Waering as paratype specimens upon the original description of the species. The designated type specimen is an incomplete chelicerae, PE5105, that remains housed at the Chicago Natural History Museum alongside the paratype specimens. The species can be differentiated from other species of Pterygotus primarily by features of its cheliceral teeth, differing from P. barrandei and P. cobbi in these teeth being less-developed and thicker in P. carmani as well as the teeth having a markedly different arrangement on the claw.

The species P. monroensis, known from deposits of late Wenlock to Ludlow age in New York State, USA, was suggested to represent a synonym of Erettopterus osiliensis by Samuel J. Ciurca, Jr. and O. Erik Tetlie in 2007, based upon the similar shape of the eyes and the carapace. Such a reassignment would have implications for other species of Pterygotus as well, with P. impacatus potentially also representing a synonym of E. osiliensis. In 2025, James Lamsdell formally synonymized both P. lanarkensis and P. monroensis with E. bilobus and E. osiliensis, respectively.

==== Discoveries in Asia ====
In 2023, Ma et al. described the species Pterygotus wanggaii, from the Early Devonian Xiaxishancun Formation in Yunnan Province, China.

== Classification ==
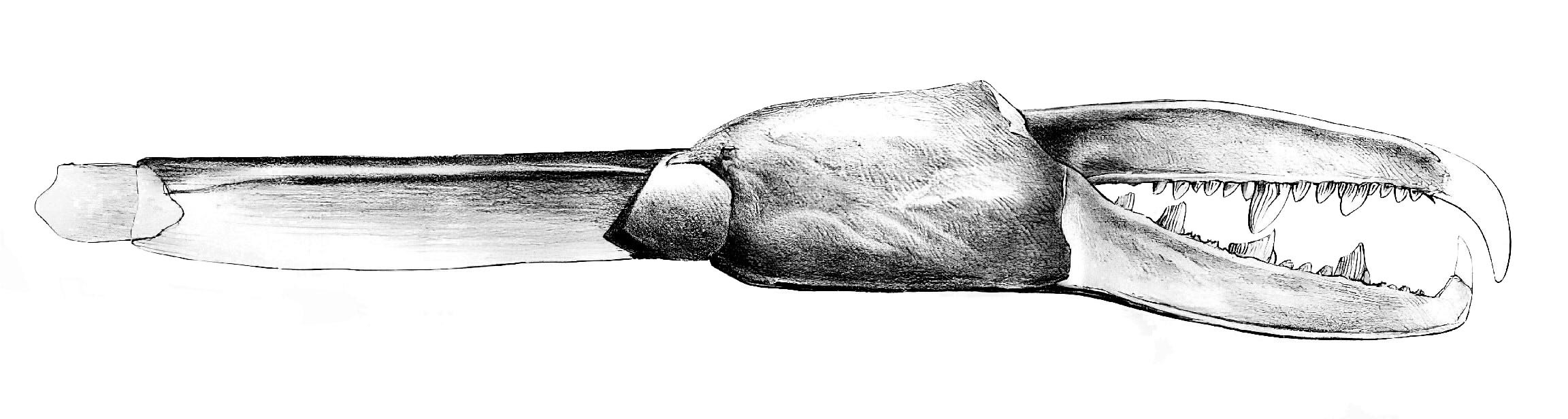
Chelicera of P. anglicus

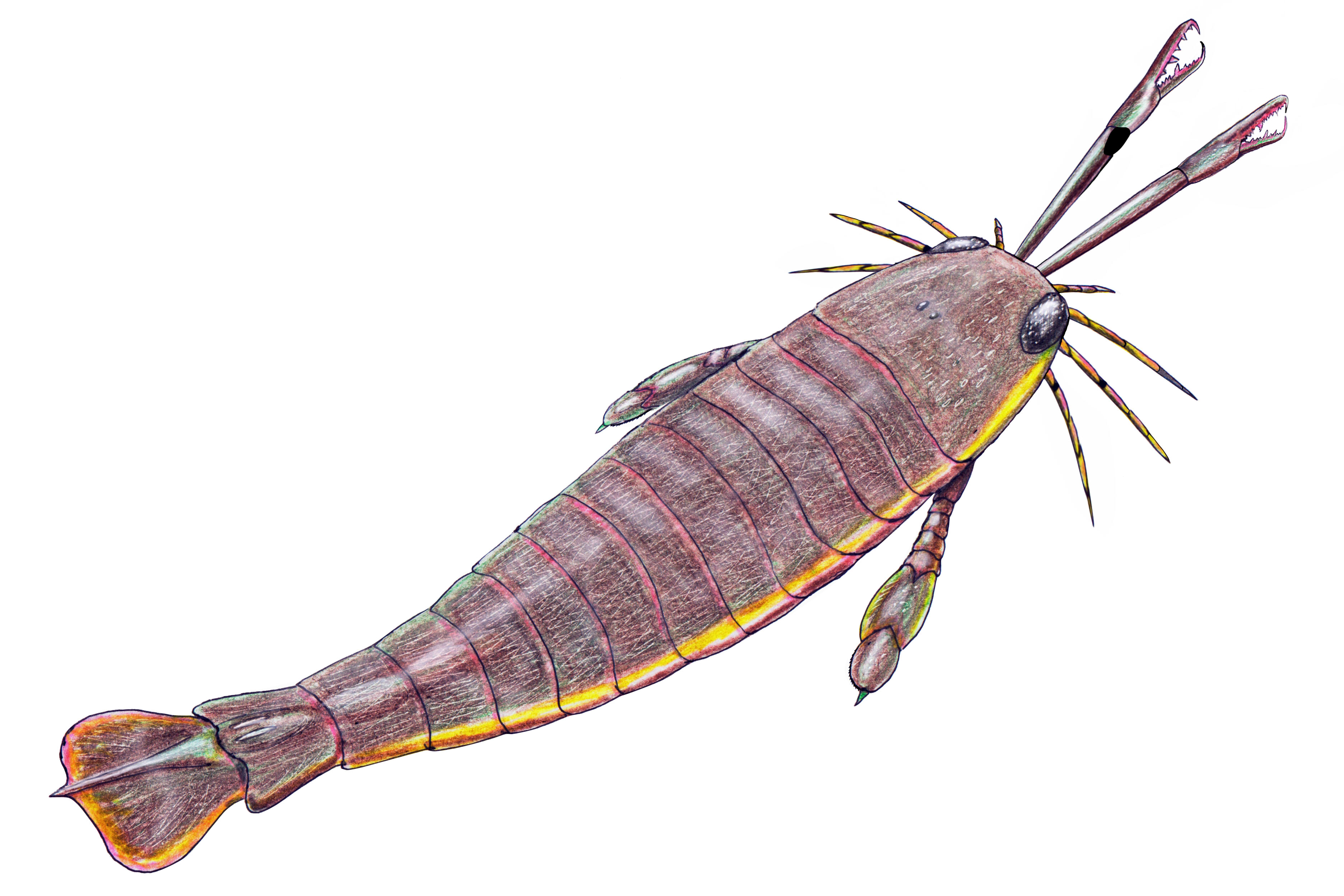
Jaekelopterus was closely related to Pterygotus. Some researchers suspect that they may represent the same genus.

Pterygotus is classified within the family Pterygotidae in the superfamily Pterygotioidea, lending its name to both its family and its superfamily. The three most derived pterygotid eurypterids, Acutiramus, Jaekelopterus and Pterygotus, are very similar to each other. Pterygotus is particularly similar to Jaekelopterus, from which it is virtually only distinct in features of the genital appendage and potentially the telson.

Similarities in the genital appendage could mean that the three genera are all synonyms of each other, as they had been classified in the past (as species of Pterygotus). Some differences between them have also been noted in the chelicerae, though chelicerae have been questioned as the basis of eurypterid generic distinction since their morphology depends on the lifestyles and has been observed to vary throughout ontogeny. Telson morphology is sometimes used as a distinguishing feature, though the telsons of the three derived pterygotid genera are all paddle-shaped (the telson of Jaekelopterus is triangular, but might fall into the morphological range of the other genera). An inclusive phylogenetic analysis with multiple species of Acutiramus, Pterygotus and Jaekelopterus is required to resolve whether or not the genera are synonyms of each other.

The cladogram below is based on the nine best-known pterygotid species and two outgroup taxa (Slimonia acuminata and Hughmilleria socialis). The cladogram also contains the maximum sizes reached by the species in question, which have been suggested to possibly have been an evolutionary trait of the group per Cope's rule ("phyletic gigantism").

- Pterygotioidea
  - Hughmilleria socialis (20 cm)
  - - Slimonia acuminata (100 cm)
    - - - Ciurcopterus ventricosus (70 cm)
        - Pterygotidae
          - - Erettopterus waylandsmithi (60 cm)
            - Erettopterus osiliensis (90 cm)
            - - Erettopterus serricaudatus (60 cm)
              - Erettopterus bilobus (70 cm)
          - - Pterygotus anglicus (160 cm)
            - - Jaekelopterus rhenaniae (250 cm)
              - - Acutiramus macrophthalmus (200 cm)
                - Acutiramus bohemicus (210 cm)

== Paleobiology ==
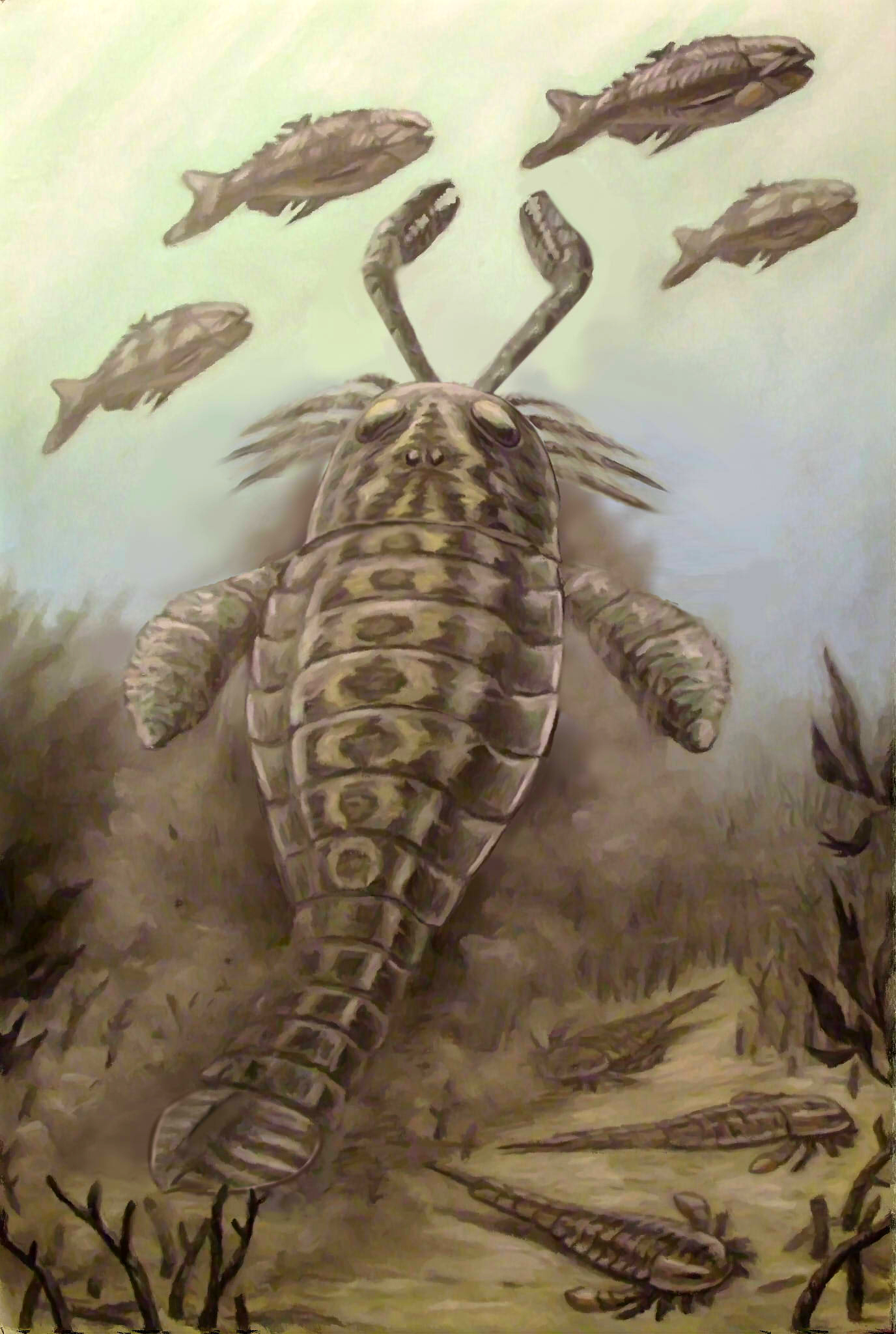
Restoration depicting Pterygotus hunting Birkenia.

The cheliceral morphology and visual acuity of the pterygotid eurypterids separates them into distinct ecological groups. The primary method for determining visual acuity in arthropods is by determining the number of lenses in their compound eyes and the interommatidial angle (shortened as IOA and referring to the angle between the optical axes of the adjacent lenses). The IOA is especially important as it can be used to distinguish different ecological roles in arthropods, being low in modern active arthropod predators.

Both Pterygotus anglicus and Jaekelopterus rhenaniae had a very high visual acuity, which researchers could determine by observing a low IOA and a large number of lenses in their compound eyes. The chelicerae of Pterygotus were enlarged, robust and possessed a curved free ramus and denticles of different lengths and sizes, all adaptations that correspond to strong puncturing and grasping abilities in extant scorpions and crustaceans. The IOA values for both Pterygotus and Jaekelopterus match those of high level and active modern predatory arthropods, indicating that they represented visual and active predators.

All known pterygotids (though they are so far unknown in Ciurcopterus) possessed cheliceral claws. The first joint of the chelicerae, where it connects to the epistoma (a plate located on the prosoma, or "head"), would have been capable of turning the entire appendage in a twisting way, which has led researchers to conclude that the function of the chelicerae would not have been only, or even primarily, for defense but rather to capture and convey food to the mouth. When captured, prey would need to be broken into smaller pieces to be able to fit into the mouth; eurypterid mouths were even less adapted to devour large pieces than mouths of modern crabs are. The eurypterid walking appendages could not cut, transport or grasp anything, so these tasks would also likely fall to the chelicerae. In crabs, the claws tear food apart and then transport the smaller pieces to the mouth. Based on the feeding process seen in modern arthropods with chelicerae, one of the claws would hold the prey while the other would cut off pieces and transport it to the mouth with continuous and simple movements.

== Paleoecology ==
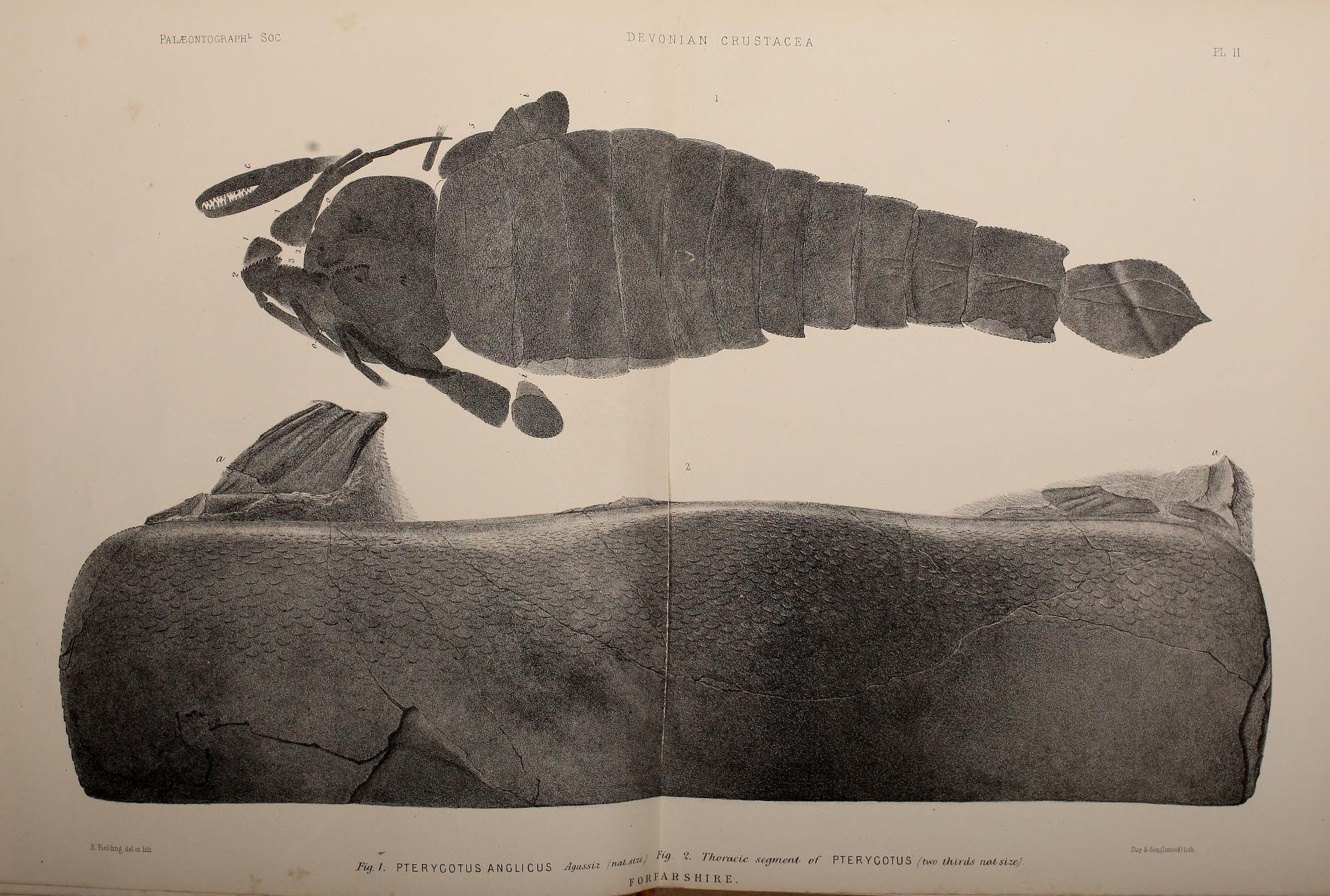
Illustration of fossils of P. anglicus, including a nearly complete specimen and a thoracic segment.

Pterygotus lived in both fully marine environments as well as lacustrine and fluvial systems, and its fossils are today recovered and associated with common and diverse fossils indicative of such environments. Notably, P. barrandei and P. cobbi occur in marine environments associated with fossils of Acutiramus. P. anglicus is known both from the Old Red Sandstone and the Campbellton formations, both of which are examples of freshwater lake and river systems. Pterygotus was more widespread than Acutiramus and as such many species occur without associated representatives of Acutiramus as well, such as the British P. lightbodyi. The living environment of P. australis, also marine, was in particularly deep water. The only known fossil organisms of the same age and place as P. australis are crinoids of the genus Dendrocrinus and Kooptoonocrinus and ophiouroids of the genus Protaster.

The deposits where the holotype specimen of P. kopaninensis was found preserves fossils of many other animals as well. Among them are trilobites such as Leonaspis, Raphiophorus and a fragmentary harpetid trilobite. Also preserved are bivalves, such as Cardiola, and graptolites, such as Monograptus. P. nobilis lived alongside representatives of Acutiramus, Erettopterus and Eusarcana as well as with a diverse fauna of conodonts, gastropods, cephalopods, ostracods, malacostracans, trilobites and bivalves and cartilaginous fish Onchus. In the Devonian Old Red Sandstone formation of Scotland, fossils of P. anglicus occur together with a wide array of different eurypterids, including Erieopterus, Pagea, Tarsopterella and Stylonurus, as well as acanthodian fish Ischnacanthus and Mesacanthus, shark Climatius and osteostracian fish Cephalaspis. Fossils of P. carmani of similar age found in the Holland Quarry Shale Formation of Ohio also preserve a diverse Devonian fauna of various eurypterids, such as Dolichopterus, Strobilopterus and Erettopterus, as well as pteraspidomorph fish Allocrytaspis and placoderm fish Aethapsis. Puncture wounds on fossil poraspid fish attributed to the related pterygotid Jaekelopterus demonstrate that pterygotids would have been capable of preying on armored fish such as pteraspidomorphs and placoderms. The deposits that yielded the fossils of P. siemiradzkii have also yielded fossils of Eurypterus and several genera of pteraspidomorph fish; Larnovaspis, Phialaspis, Corvaspis and Podolaspis.

Five species of Pterygotus have been discovered in deposits of Silurian age in the Welsh Borderland, P. ludensis, P. arcuatus, P. grandidentatus, P. lightbodyi and P. denticulatus. The Welsh Borderland preserves one of the more extensive eurypterid faunas known, with the exact genera and species depending on the precise time. The Wenlock-aged P. grandidentatus occurred together with Mixopterus, P. arcuatus of Middle Ludlow age occurred together with Salteropterus, Erettopterus and Carcinosoma whilst P. lightbodyi and P. denticulatus were contemporaries with each other and species of the genera Erettopterus and Carcinosoma. P. ludensis, Downtonian in age, occurred together with a diverse array of eurypterids composed of Carcinosoma, Dolichopterus, Erettopterus, Hughmilleria, Parahughmilleria, Eurypterus, Nanahughmilleria, Marsupipterus, Stylonurus, Tarsopterella, Slimonia and Salteropterus.

The dubious P. taurinus from England has been found in deposits that have also yielded the remains of Erettopterus as well as a variety of fish, such as acanthodians, thelodontiforms as well as cephalaspidomorphs Hemicyclaspis and Thyestes.

In some cases, Pterygotus represents the only known eurypterid in its living environment. P. floridanus has been found in an environment otherwise only known to have included gastropods (such as Plectonotus), ostracods, pelecypods, tentaculitides (such as Tentaculites) and a diverse fauna of bivalves (including Eoschizodus, Pleurodapis, Arisaiga, Pterinopecten and Modiomorpha). P. gaspesiensis from Canada has been recovered from an environment home to a diverse set of bivalves and gastropods as well as the trilobite Phacops and malacostracan Tropidocaris, but no other known eurypterids.

== See also ==
- List of eurypterid genera
- Timeline of eurypterid research
