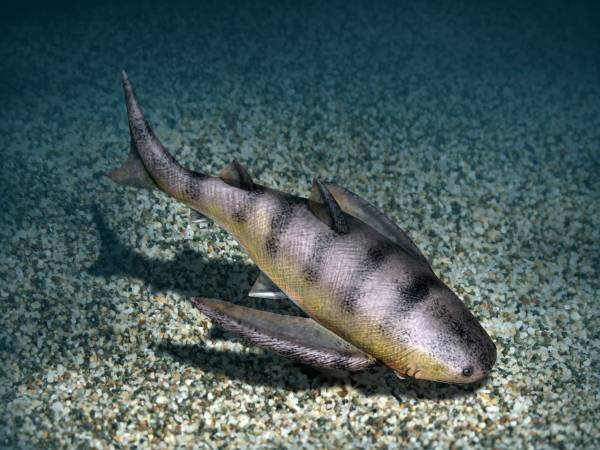
- Reconstruction of Gyracanthus

Scientific classification
- Kingdom: Animalia
- Phylum: Chordata
- Class: Chondrichthyes
- Subclass: †Acanthodii
- Order: †Climatiiformes (?)
- Family: †Gyracanthidae; Woodward, 1906

Genera
- †Gyracanthides; †Gyracanthus

= Gyracanthidae =

Gyracanthidae Temporal range: 419.2–307.0 Ma Lochkovian - Moscovian

Extinct family of acanthodian

Gyracanthidae is a family of extinct fish belonging to the class Acanthodii, known from early Devonian to late Carboniferous. Members are characterized by large, broad-based, paired fin spines with the pectoral fin spines having a distinct longitudinal curvature. Although it was originally classified in order Climatiiformes, later research questioned this.
