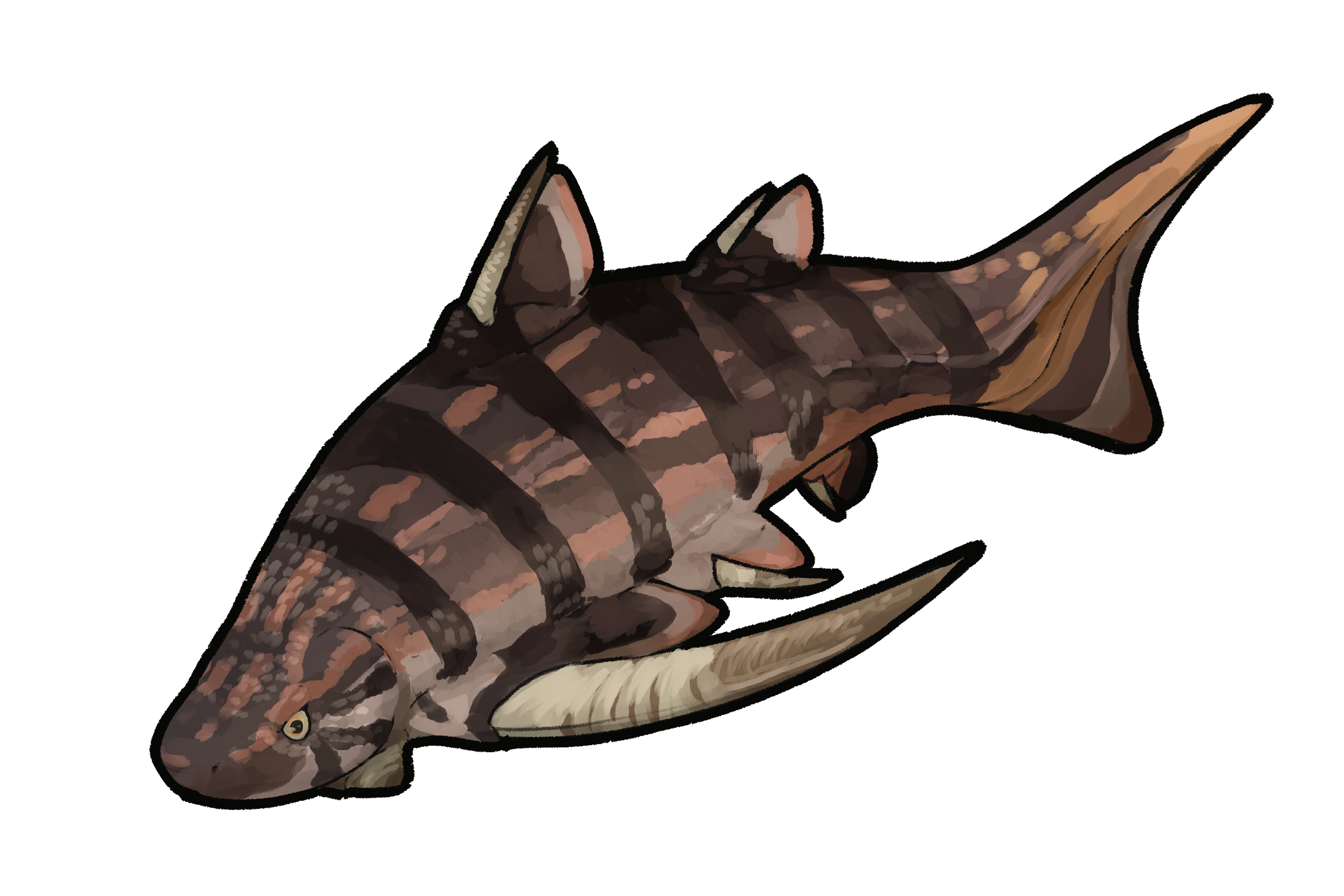
- Life restoration

Scientific classification
- Kingdom: Animalia
- Phylum: Chordata
- Class: Chondrichthyes
- Subclass: †Acanthodii
- Order: †Climatiiformes (?)
- Family: †Gyracanthidae
- Genus: †Gyracanthides; Woodward, 1906

Type species
- †Gyracanthides murrayi Woodward, 1906

Other species
- †G. warreni White, 1968; †G. hawkinsi Turner et al., 2005; †G. riniensis Gess & Burrow, 2024

= Gyracanthides =

Gyracanthides Temporal range: Devonian–Carboniferous (Pragian–Visean)

Extinct genus of cartilaginous fishes

Gyracanthides is an extinct genus of acanthodian gnathostome, known from Devonian to Early Carboniferous.

== Description ==
Gyracanthides is large acanthodian, G. murrayi reached the length up to 1.2 m (3 ft 11 in). The pectoral fin spines are large compared to its body, for specimen that have estimated to be 90 cm (35 in) had pectoral fin spines around 40 cm (16 in) long. A recent study suggested that Gyracanthides is closely related to chondrichthyans (as currently delimited), and that acanthodians are paraphyletic.
