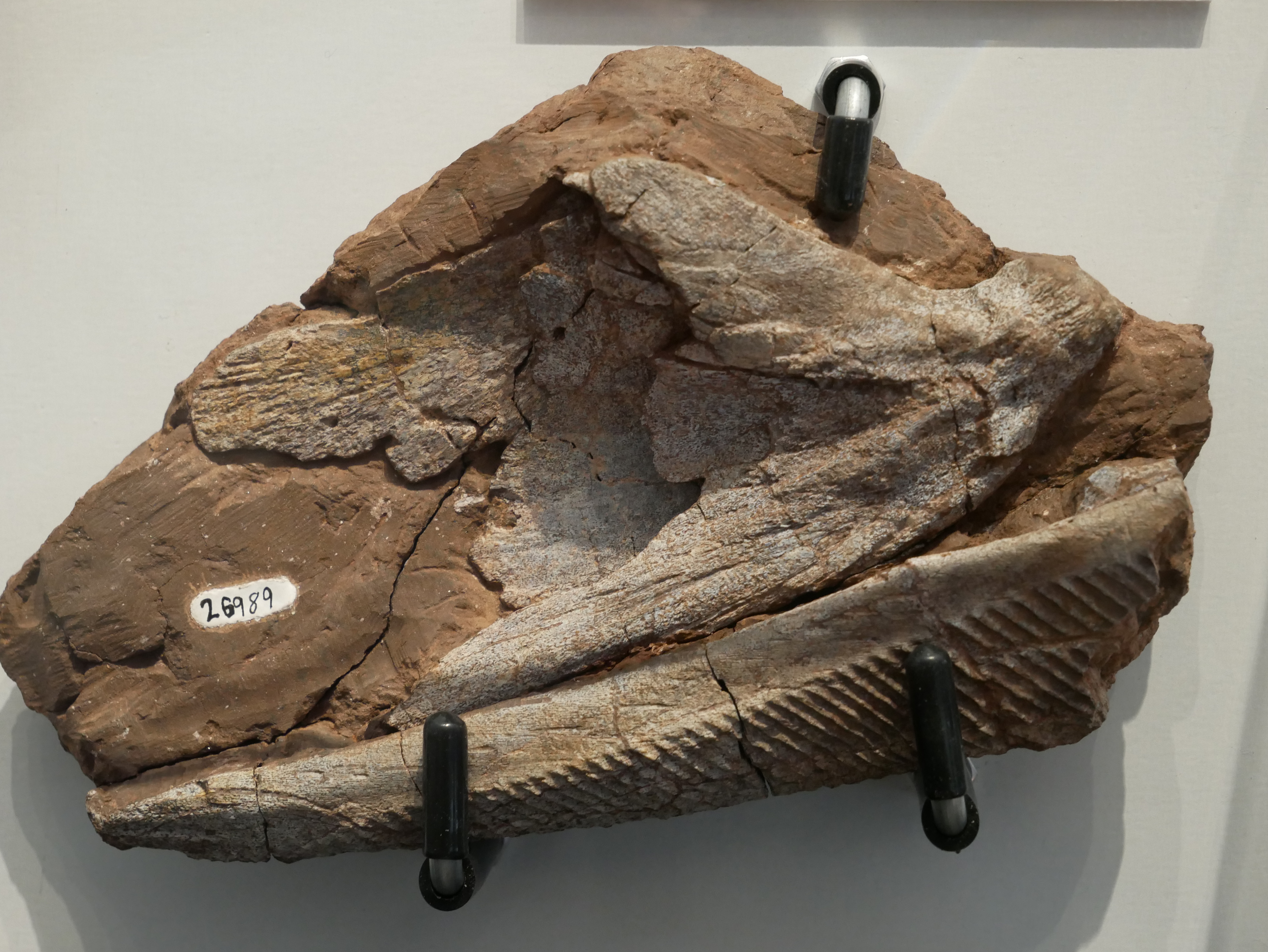
- Shoulder girdle and pectoral fin spine of Gyracanthus sherwoodi, Academy of Natural Sciences of Drexel University

Scientific classification
- Kingdom: Animalia
- Phylum: Chordata
- Class: Chondrichthyes
- Subclass: †Acanthodii
- Order: †Climatiiformes (?)
- Family: †Gyracanthidae
- Genus: †Gyracanthus; Agassiz, 1837

Species:
- See text

= Gyracanthus =

Gyracanthus Temporal range: Middle Devonian–Bashkirian

Extinct genus of cartilaginous fishes

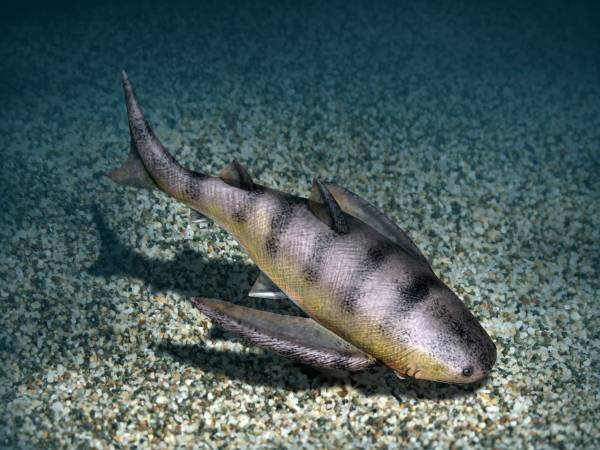
Artist's reconstruction of Gyracanthus

Gyracanthus (from Greek: γύρος gyros, 'curved' and Greek: ἄκανθα akantha, 'spine') is an extinct genus of acanthodian.

== Species ==
There are at least twenty one definitively known species, and at least one species tentatively assigned to Gyracanthus.

- G. alleni
- G. alnwicensis
- G. compressus
- G. convexus
- G. cordatus
- G. duplicatus
- G. falciformis
- G. formosus
- G. incurvus
- G. inornatus
- G.? jasperi
- G. magnificus
- G. nobilis
- G. obliquus
- G. parvulus
- G. primaevus
- G. rectus
- G. rothrocki
- G. sarlei
- G. sherwoodi
- G. tuberculatus
- G. youngii

== See also ==
- List of acanthodians
