= Aeronian =

Second stage of the Silurian

- 440.5 ± 1.0 – 438.6 ± 1.0 Ma

Chronology
← / Lau event; ← / Mulde event; ← / Ireviken event
Subdivision of the Silurian according to the ICS, as of 2023. Vertical axis scale: Millions of years ago

Etymology
- Name formality: Formal

Usage information
- Celestial body: Earth
- Regional usage: Global (ICS)
- Time scale(s) used: ICS Time Scale

Definition
- Chronological unit: Age
- Stratigraphic unit: Stage
- Time span formality: Formal
- Lower boundary definition: FAD of the graptolite Demirastrites triangulatus
- Lower boundary GSSP: Hlásná Třebaň section, Czech Republic; 49.9230°N 14.2119°E
- Lower GSSP ratified: 2024
- Upper boundary definition: FAD of the graptolite Spirograptus guerichi
- Upper boundary GSSP: El Pintado section, Seville, Spain; 37.9853°N 5.9285°W
- Upper GSSP ratified: 2024

In the geologic timescale, the Aeronian is an age of the Llandovery Epoch of the Silurian Period of the Paleozoic Era of the Phanerozoic Eon that began 440.5 ± 1.0 Ma and ended 438.6 ± 1.0 Ma (million years ago). The Aeronian Age succeeds the Rhuddanian Age and precedes the Telychian Age, all in the same epoch.

During the Aeronian the Sedgwickii Event occurred in which graptolite diversity was greatly reduced. This event has been attested in locations such as today's Canada, Libya as well as in La Chilca Formation in Argentina (then part of Gondwana).

It was also from this time that the first gnathostomates appeared, represented by the genera Qianodus and Fanjingshania.

== GSSP ==
The GSSP is located in the Trefawr Track section, 500m north of Cwm-coed-Aeron Farm, Wales, UK. The GSSP lies within the gently-dipping blocky mudstones of the Trefawr Formation, which principally yield abundant and diverse shelly faunas, but also contain enough graptolites to allow recognition of several biozones.
