= Parexus =

Parexus Temporal range: Early Devonian

Scientific classification
- Kingdom: Animalia
- Phylum: Chordata
- Class: Chondrichthyes
- Subclass: †Acanthodii
- Order: †Climatiiformes
- Family: †Climatiidae
- Genus: †Parexus; Agassiz, 1845
- Species: †P. recurvus

Binomial name
- †Parexus recurvus Agassiz, 1845

Synonyms
- Parexus falcatus; Farnellia tuberculata Traquair

Extinct genus of cartilaginous fishes

Parexus is an extinct genus of acanthodian fish. Acanthodians are often referred to as ‘spiny sharks’, although acanthodians are not true sharks and evolved perhaps 50 million years earlier than sharks. Acanthodians share several features with bony fish and cartilaginous fish; they often have spines supporting their fins.

Parexus is recognised by its large anterior dorsal fin spine. Several fossils have been discovered from the Early (Lower) Devonian Period of Tillywhandland, Scotland. Two species were described, P. recurvus and P. falcatus, both from Scotland; according to Burrow et al. (2013) P. falcatus is in fact a junior synonym of P. recurvus.
