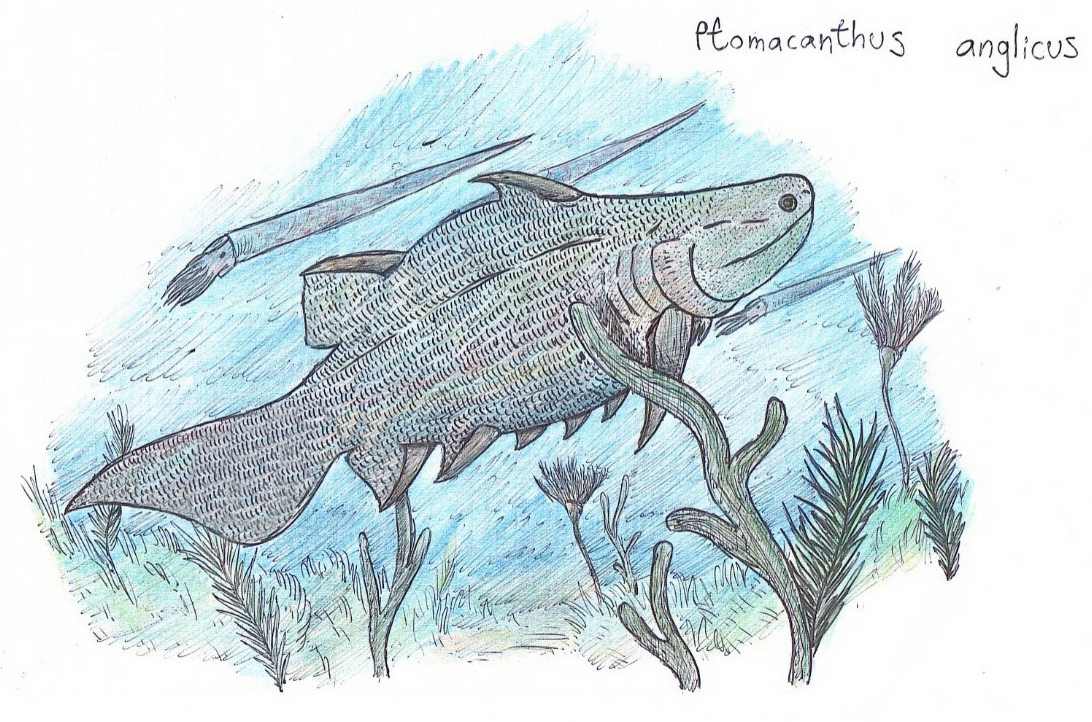

Scientific classification
- Kingdom: Animalia
- Phylum: Chordata
- Class: Chondrichthyes
- Genus: †Ptomacanthus; Miles 1973
- Species: †P. anglicus

Binomial name
- †Ptomacanthus anglicus Miles 1973

= Ptomacanthus =

Ptomacanthus Temporal range: Early Devonian (Lochkovian)

Extinct genus of cartilaginous fishes

Ptomacanthus (meaning thorny corpse) is an extinct genus of spiny shark, an early relative of living cartilaginous fishes (sharks, rays, and chimaeras).

== Location found ==
Ptomacanthus is known mainly from the Old Red Sandstone of the United Kingdom. The most completely known species, P. anglicus is known from several articulated fossils from Wayne Herbert Quarry, Herefordshire, United Kingdom. Two indeterminate species are known from shoulder-girdles recovered from Castle Mattock Quarry, Herefordshire and Zaleszychi, Ukraine.

== Description ==
The only species known in any detail, P. anglicus was a fish about 25 cm long. Like other acanthodians it had small, shark like scales, and a suite of fin-spines in front of its dorsal, pectoral, and pelvic fins.

== Paleobiology ==
P. anglicus is important to our understanding of early vertebrate evolution as it preserves part of the braincase, a scientifically informative part of the skeleton. Because of the cartilaginous makeup of the acanthodian internal skeleton, it is very rarely preserved, and the braincase of Ptomacanthus is only the second acanthodian braincase known to science (the first being that of Acanthodes). The description of this braincase reignited debate over the relationships of acanthodians as well as those of early vertebrates more generally.
