= Ischnacanthus =

Ischnacanthus Temporal range: Late Silurian - Early Devonian, Pridoli–Lochkovian
- Life restoration of Ischnacanthus gracilis

Scientific classification
- Kingdom: Animalia
- Phylum: Chordata
- Class: Chondrichthyes
- Subclass: †Acanthodii
- Order: †Ischnacanthiformes
- Family: †Ischnacanthidae
- Genus: †Ischnacanthus; Egerton, 1861

Species
- I. gracilis Egerton, 1861 (type); I. wickhami White, 1961; I. kingi White, 1961; I.(?) anglicus White, 1961

Extinct genus of cartilaginous fishes

Ischnacanthus is an extinct genus of acanthodian jawed fish. It lived from the Pridoli to the Lochkovian. The type species I. gracilis is only known from Lochkovian.

== Discovery and naming ==
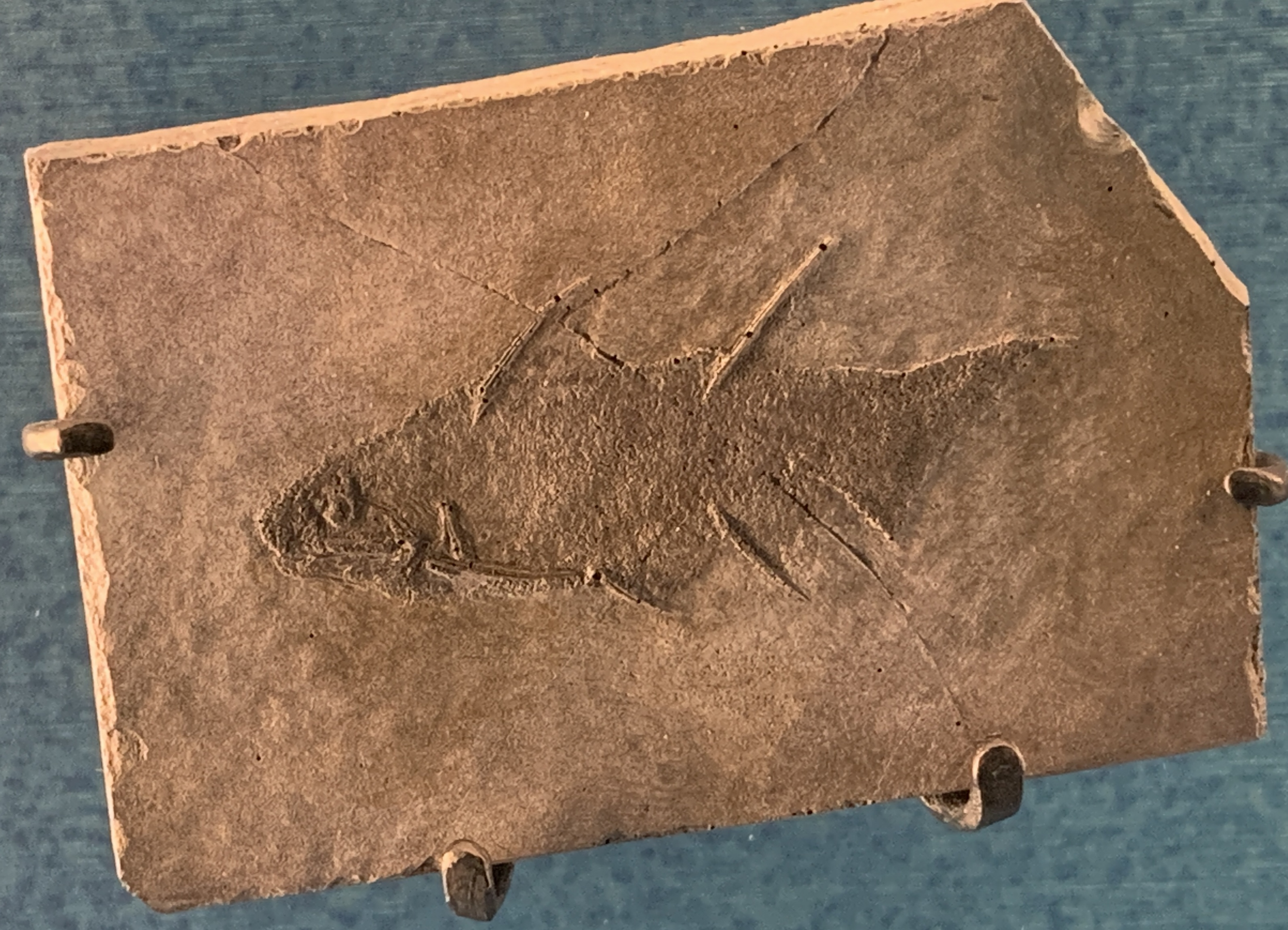
Ischnacanthus sp. cast. Early Devonian, Mackenzie Mountains, Northwest Territories (Canada). At the Royal Tyrrell Museum of Palaeontology.

Ischnacanthus was first discovered in 1861 by Egerton, and later assigned to Isnacanthidae by A. S. Woodward in 1891. The type specimen that defines this species is named Ischnacanthus gracilis, and helps outline the Ischnacanthidae family it belongs to. Fossils of this fish were first discovered in Tillywhandland Quarry, Forfar, Scotland.

The acanthodians, the class of fish that includes Ischnacanthus, are the subject of some dispute over their systematic position because they have features of both bony fish, the Osteichthyes, and cartilaginous fish, the Chondrichthyes.

== Description ==
Ischnacanthus was an acanthodian with a long body covered in mosaic-like scales. They possess highly advanced, spindle-shaped bodies that were thought to have made them swift swimmers. This fish had two narrow dorsal spines, one either side of and just behind its head. It was a predatory fish that possessed a mouth with very small teeth on the lower jaw. Like all acanthodians, massive spines formed of dentine support all fins other than the caudal fins. This species probably lived in Lake Forfar, which is a fresh-water lake surrounded by volcanoes.
