= Lochkov =

Lochkov Lochkov
- Municipal District of Prague
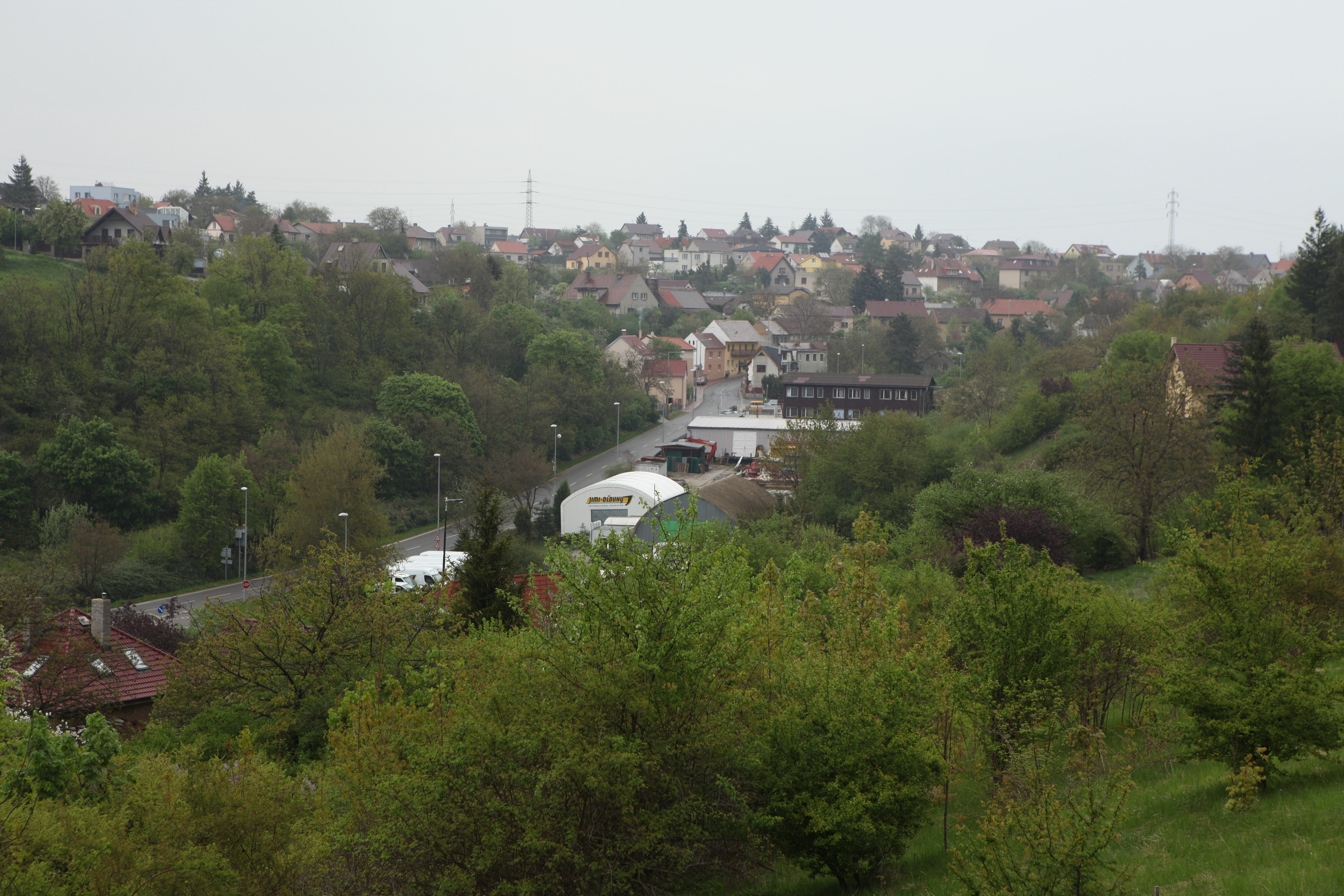

- Flag Coat of arms
- Interactive map of Lochkov
- Coordinates: 50°0′9″N 14°21′10″E
- Country: Czech Republic
- Region: Prague
- District: Prague 16
- Founded: 12th century

Government
  - Mayor: Karel Hanzlík

Area
  - Total: 2.72 km^{2} (1.05 sq mi)
- Elevation: 315 m (1,033 ft)

Population (2021)
  - Total: 874
  - Density: 321/km^{2} (832/sq mi)
- Demonym: Lochkovian
- Time zone: UTC+1 (CET)
  - Summer (DST): UTC+2 (CEST)
- Postal code: 154 00
- Area code: +420

Lochkov is a municipal district (městská část) in Prague, Czech Republic. It has 874 inhabitants as of 2021, and is located in the southwestern part of the city. It is most notable for being the namesake of the Lochkovian stage.

== Demographics ==
Historical population
Year	Pop.	±%
1869	430	—
1880	425	−1.2%
1890	508	+19.5%
1900	457	−10.0%
1910	508	+11.2%
1921	480	−5.5%
1930	649	+35.2%
1950	675	+4.0%
1961	700	+3.7%
1970	681	−2.7%
1980	649	−4.7%
1991	565	−12.9%
2001	582	+3.0%
2011	631	+8.4%
2021	874	+38.5%
Source: Censuses
