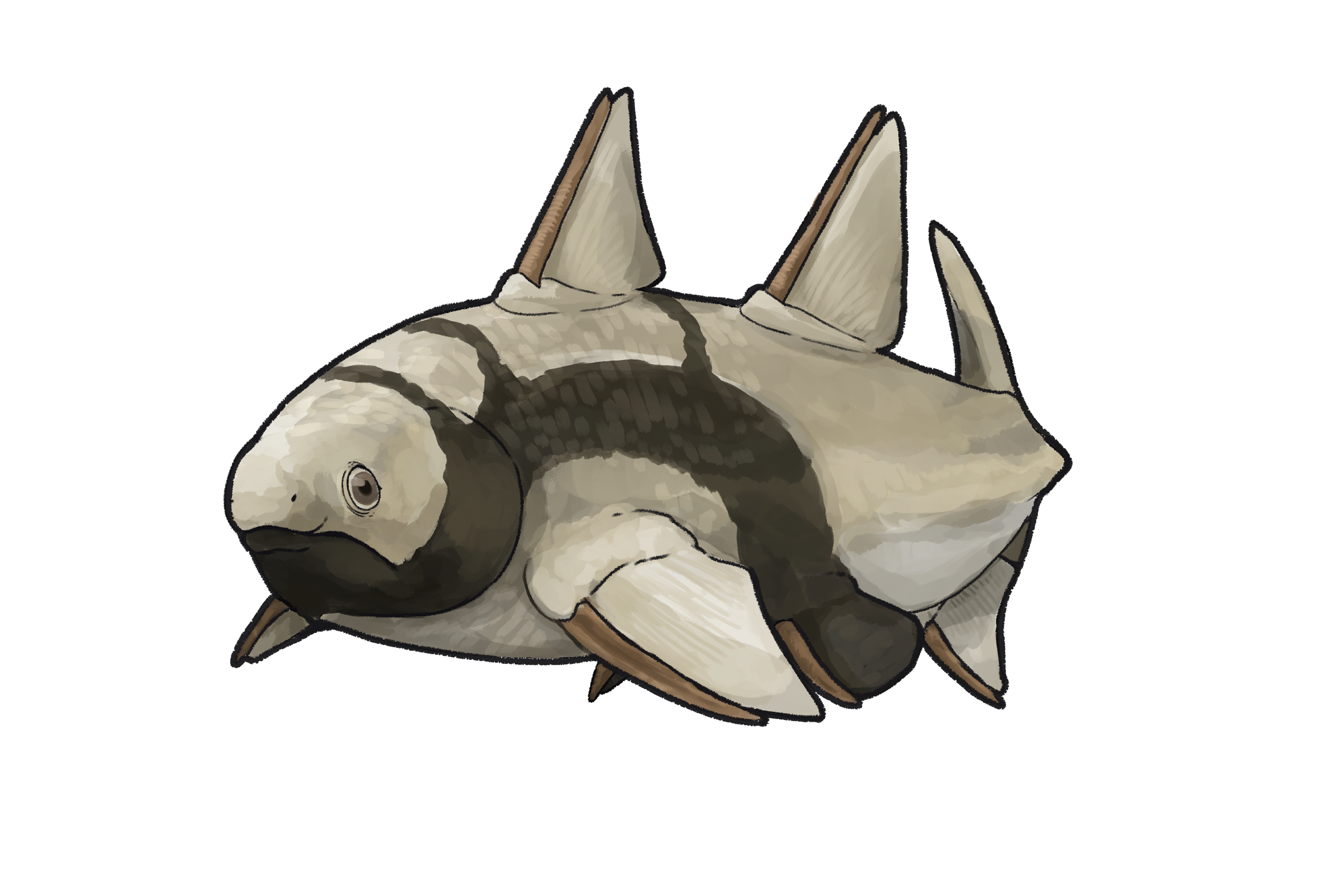
- Tetanopsyrus lindoei life restoration

Scientific classification
- Kingdom: Animalia
- Phylum: Chordata
- Class: Chondrichthyes
- Subclass: †Acanthodii
- Order: †Diplacanthiformes
- Family: †Tetanopsyridae; Gagnier et al., 1999
- Genus: †Tetanopsyrus; Gagnier et al., 1999

Species
- Tetanopsyrus lindoei Gagnier et al., 1999; Tetanopsyrus breviacanthias Hanke et al., 2001

= Tetanopsyrus =

Tetanopsyrus Temporal range: Lochkovian

Extinct genus of cartilaginous fishes

Tetanopsyrus is a genus of Acanthodii. There are two species of this genus, both of which lived in the lower Devonian (Lochkovian) of the Northwest Territories, Canada.

== Species ==
Species	Authority	Referred Material	Age	Locality
T. lindoei	Gagnier, Hanke, & Wilson, 1999	UALVP 39078 (holotype, articulated skeleton); UALVP 32571; UALVP 38682; UALVP 43026	Early Devonian (Lochkovian)	MOTH locality outcrop in the Mackenzie Mountains, western Northwest Territories, Canada
T. breviacanthias	Hanke, Davis, & Wilson, 2001	UALVP 43246 (holotype, articulated skeleton); UALVP 39062 (partial); UALVP 42512; UALVP 43089 (juvenile); UALVP 44030 (juvenile); UALVP 45153	Early Devonian (Lochkovian)	MOTH locality outcrop in the Mackenzie Mountains, western Northwest Territories, Canada
