= Trefawr Track =

UK road-demarcated geological boundary

Coordinates: 52.0422°N 3.695°W

Trefawr Track, a forestry road north of Cwm-coed-Aeron Farm, Llandovery, Wales, is the location of the Global Boundary Stratotype Section and Point (GSSP) which marks the boundary between the Rhuddanian and Aeronian stages of the Silurian period on the geologic time scale. The GSSP was ratified in 1984.

The boundary is defined as the first appearance of the graptolite Monograptus austerus sequens (the base of the Monograptus triangulatus biozone). The section is primarily mudstone, which yields an abundance of shelly faunas. The graptolite Diplograptus elongatus occurs immediately below the boundary.
