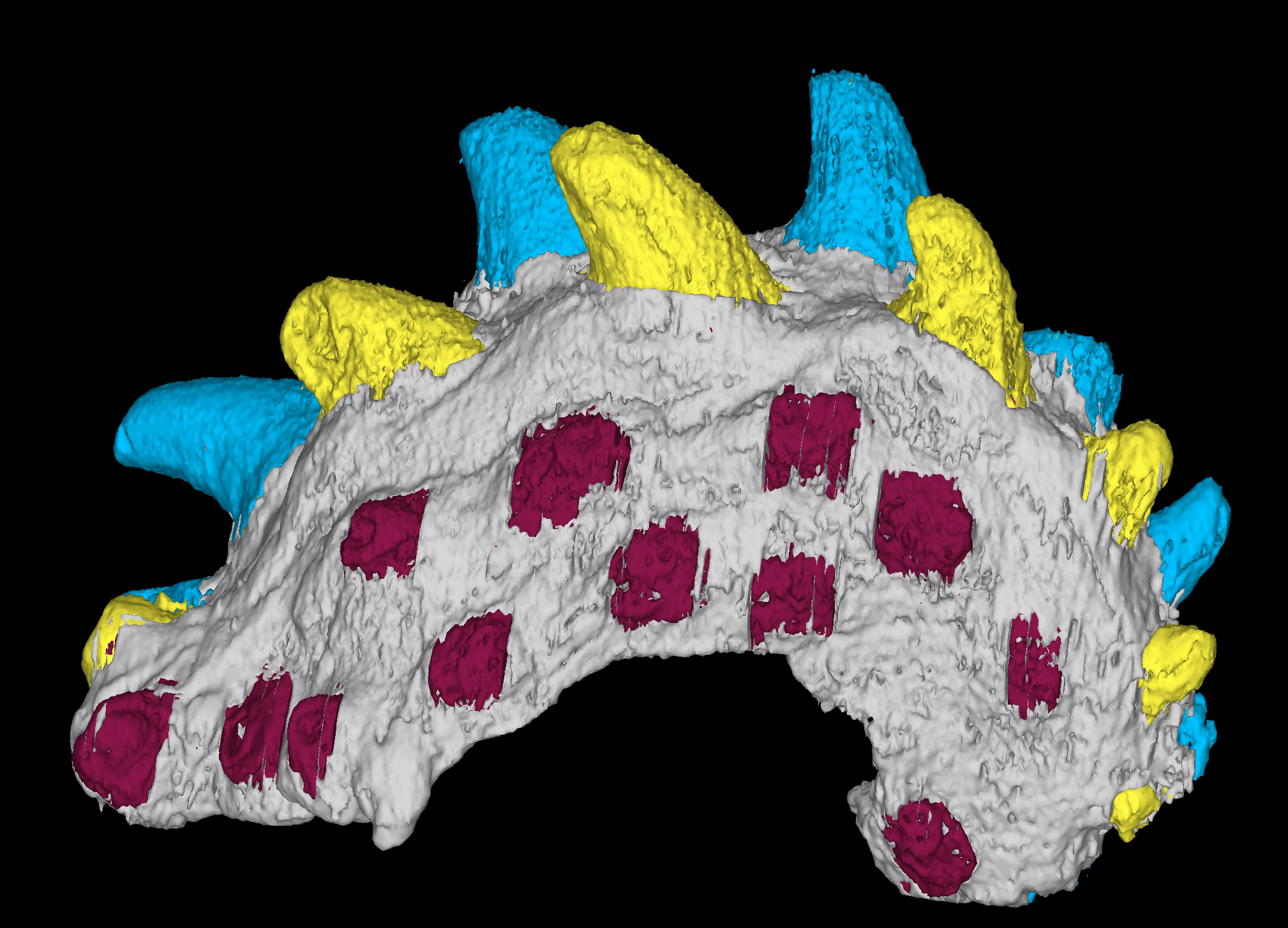
- Tooth whorl of Qianodus duplicis. Volume rendering of the holotype specimen shown in lateral view with colour coded primary (yellow and blue) and accessory (red) teeth.

Scientific classification
- Kingdom: Animalia
- Phylum: Chordata
- Class: Chondrichthyes
- Genus: †Qianodus; Andreev et al. 2022
- Species: †Q. duplicis

Binomial name
- †Qianodus duplicis Andreev et al. 2022

= Qianodus =

Qianodus Temporal range: Aeronian

Extinct Silurian chondrichthyan genus

Qianodus (from the Chinese: 黔, 'Qian', the ancient name for Guizhou and the Greek: ὀδούς, odus, 'tooth') is a jawed vertebrate genus that is based on disarticulated teeth from the lower Silurian (Aeronian, c. 439 Myr) of China. The type and only species of Qianodus, Q. duplicis, is known from compound dental elements called tooth whorls, each consisting of multiple tooth generations carried by a spiral-shaped base. The tooth whorls of Qianodus represent the oldest unequivocal remains of a toothed vertebrate, predating previously recorded occurrences by about 14 million years. The specimens attributed to the genus come from limestone conglomerate beds of the Rongxi Formation exposed near the village of Leijiatun, Guizhou Province, China. These horizons have been interpreted as tidal deposits^{1} that form part of the shallow marine sequences of the Rongxi Formation.

== Morphology and development ==
Qianodus is known from 23 tooth whorls of varying state of preservation that range in size from 1.5 to 2.5 mm. A conspicuous feature of the whorls is a pair of primary tooth rows carried by a raised medial area of the whorl base. These teeth show an incremental increase in size towards the inner (lingual) portion of the whorl. The whorls of Qianodus differ from those of other vertebrates in the offset between the two primary tooth rows. The asymmetry of this tooth arrangement is mirrored in the specimens, which exhibit either left or right configurations of the more labial (progenitor) tooth row. This is seen as evidence for tooth whorl positions on opposing jaw rami and combined with other evidence suggests that the dentition of Qianodus was formed of closely spaced tooth whorls distributed along the length of the jaw.

The whorl base is tall and has steep lateral faces that carry arched rows of small, accessory, teeth oriented parallel to the whorl crest. The earliest deposited generations of accessory teeth in each row are located at the tip of the whorl spiral labially of the primary teeth.

Unlike the continuously shedding teeth of modern sharks, the tooth whorls of Qianodus retained their teeth and grew in size throughout the life of the animal. The recorded gradual enlargement of the whorl teeth and the widening of the whorl base was a response to the continuous increase of jaw size during development.

Two of the Qianodus whorls have noticeably smaller sizes and fewer tooth generations and represent early developmental stages. A comparison with the more numerous mature whorls suggests that primary tooth rows were the first to be incepted, whereas the addition of the lateral (accessory) whorl teeth occurred later in development.

== Phylogenetic position ==
Qianodus is placed within the chondrichthyan stem group on the basis of dental characters derived from the limited number of available specimens. Discrete tooth whorls occur in both major clades of crown gnathostomes, the osteichthyans and chondrichthyans, but have not been reported in their placoderm ancestors. The proposed for Qianodus whorl-based dentition is a derived character of chondrichthyans within jawed vertebrates that has been reported in a number of stem lineages, including climatiid acanthodians.
