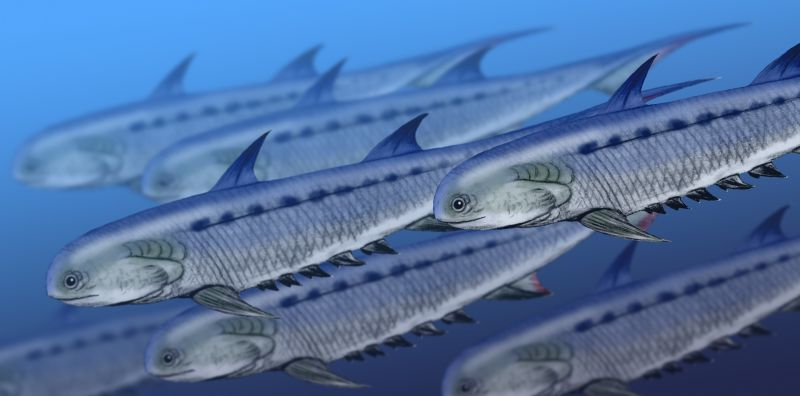

Scientific classification
- Kingdom: Animalia
- Phylum: Chordata
- Class: Chondrichthyes
- Subclass: †Acanthodii
- Order: †Climatiiformes
- Family: †Climatiidae
- Genus: †Climatius; Agassiz, 1845
- Species: †C. reticulatus

Binomial name
- †Climatius reticulatus Agassiz, 1845

= Climatius =

Climatius Temporal range: Lochkovian

Extinct genus of cartilaginous fishes

Climatius (from Greek: κλίμα klíma, 'gradation') is an extinct genus of spiny shark. This genus is known from the Early Devonian (Lochkovian) of Europe, previously considered Silurian remains actually belong to Nostolepis instead.

Climatius was an active swimmer, judging from its powerful caudal fin and abundant stabilizing fins, and probably preyed on other fish and crustaceans. Its lower jaw was lined with sharp teeth which were replaced when worn, but the upper jaw had no teeth. It had large eyes, suggesting that it hunted by sight.

It was a small fish, at 7.5 centimetres (3 in) long, and to discourage predators (such as larger fish and cephalopods), Climatius sported fifteen sharp spines. There was one spine each on the paired pelvic and pectoral fins, and on the single anal and two dorsal fins, and a four pairs without fins on the fish's underside.

== See also ==
- List of acanthodians
