= La Chilca Formation =

Geologic formation in Argentina

La Chilca Formation (Spanish: Formación La Chilca) is a geological formation that crops out in the Precordillera of San Juan Province, Argentina. Rocks of the formation are mostly shale and sandstone that deposited during the Ordovician and Silurian periods. The formation contains a high diversity of graptolite fossils. Graptolite fossil taxa found include:

- Monograptus priodon
- Retiolites geinitzianus
- Stimulograptus sedgwickii
- Metaclimacograptus asejradi
- Pseudoplegmatograptus reticulatus
- Talacastograptus leanzai
- Coronograptus
- Pristiograptus
- Stimulograptus
- Pristiograptus
