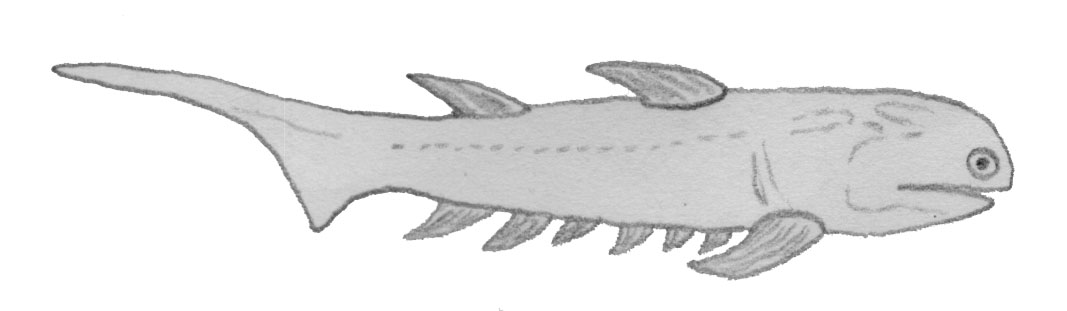
- An artist's restoration of Climatius

Scientific classification
- Kingdom: Animalia
- Phylum: Chordata
- Class: Chondrichthyes
- Subclass: †Acanthodii
- Order: †Climatiiformes

Suborders and families
- Climatiida; ?Gyracanthidae; Climatiidae; Diplacanthida; Culmacanthidae; Tetanopsyridae; Diplacanthidae

= Climatiiformes =

Climatiiformes Temporal range: 418–298 Ma Silurian - Carboniferous

Extinct paraphyletic order of cartilaginous fishes

The Climatiiformes is a paraphyletic order of extinct fish belonging to the class Acanthodii. Like most other "spiny sharks", the Climatiiformes had sharp spines. These animals were often fairly small in size and lived from the Late Silurian to the Early Carboniferous period. The type genus is Climatius. The order used to be subdivided into the suborders Climatiida and Diplacanthida, but subsequently Diplacanthida has been elevated to a separate order, the Diplacanthiformes. The Diplacanthiformes take their name from Diplacanthus, first described by Agassiz in 1843. Family Gyracanthidae is sometimes rejected from this order.
