= Lochkovian =

First stage of the Devonian

- 419.62 ± 1.36 – 413.02 ± 1.91 Ma
- International Silurian-Devonian stratotype, in Klonk u Suchomast, Czechia

Chronology
← / Hangenberg event, Famennian glaciation; ← / Kellwasser event (Late Devonian mass extinction); ← / Widespread shrubs & trees; ← / Hunsrück fauna; ← / Rhynie chert
Subdivision of the Devonian according to the ICS, as of 2024; Vertical axis scale: Millions of years ago

Etymology
- Name formality: Formal
- Name ratified: 1985

Usage information
- Celestial body: Earth
- Regional usage: Global (ICS)
- Time scale(s) used: ICS Time Scale

Definition
- Chronological unit: Age
- Stratigraphic unit: Stage
- Time span formality: Formal
- Lower boundary definition: FAD of the graptolite Monograptus uniformis
- Lower boundary GSSP: Klonk, Prague, Czech Republic; 49.8550°N 13.7920°E
- Lower GSSP ratified: 1972
- Upper boundary definition: FAD of the conodonts Eognathodus sulcatus and Latericriodus steinachensis Morph beta
- Upper boundary GSSP: Velká Chuchle quarry, Velká Chuchle, Prague, Czech Republic; 50.0147°N 14.3726°E
- Upper GSSP ratified: 1989

The Lochkovian is one of three faunal stages in the Early Devonian Epoch. It lasted from 419.62 ± 1.36 million years ago to 413.02 ± 1.91 million years ago. It marked the beginning of the Devonian Period, and was followed by the Pragian Stage. It is named after the village of Lochkov in the Czech Republic, now part of the city of Prague. The GSSP is located within the Lochkow Formation at the Klonk Section in Prague.

In North America the Lochkovian Stage is represented by Gedinnian or Helderbergian time.
