= List of acanthodian genera =

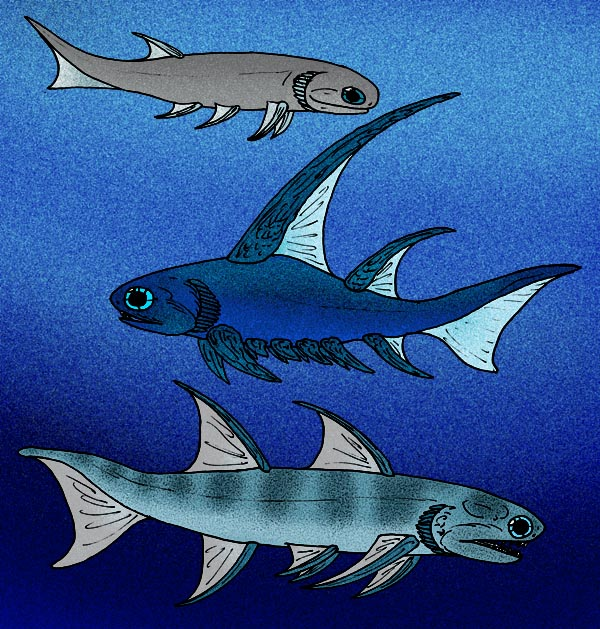
Various primitive acanthodians from Early Devonian England and Scotland, Mesacanthus pusillus, Parexus falcatus, Ishnacanthus gracilis.

This list of acanthodian genera is an attempt to create a comprehensive listing of all genera that have ever been included in the subclass Acanthodii, excluding purely vernacular terms. The list includes all commonly accepted genera, but also genera that are now considered invalid, doubtful (nomina dubia), or were not formally published (nomina nuda), as well as junior synonyms of more established names, and genera that are no longer considered acanthodians. Not counting their descendants, the modern chondricthyans, all acanthodians are extinct. Extinct genera are marked with a dagger (†)

== Naming conventions and terminology ==
Naming conventions and terminology follow the International Code of Zoological Nomenclature. Technical terms used include:

- Junior synonym: A name which describes the same taxon as a previously published name. If two or more genera are formally designated and the type specimens are later assigned to the same genus, the first to be published (in chronological order) is the senior synonym, and all other instances are junior synonyms. Senior synonyms are generally used, except by special decision of the ICZN, but junior synonyms cannot be used again, even if deprecated. Junior synonymy is often subjective, unless the genera described were both based on the same type specimen.
- Nomen nudum (Latin for "naked name"): A name that has appeared in print but has not yet been formally published by the standards of the ICZN. Nomina nuda (the plural form) are invalid, and are therefore not italicized as a proper generic name would be. If the name is later formally published, that name is no longer a nomen nudum and will be italicized on this list. Often, the formally published name will differ from any nomina nuda that describe the same specimen.
- Nomen oblitum (Latin for "forgotten name"): A name that has not been used in the scientific community for more than fifty years after its original proposal.
- Preoccupied name: A name that is formally published, but which has already been used for another taxon. This second use is invalid (as are all subsequent uses) and the name must be replaced. As preoccupied names are not valid generic names, they will also go unitalicized on this list.
- Nomen dubium (Latin for "dubious name"): A name describing a fossil with no unique diagnostic features. As this can be an extremely subjective and controversial designation, this term is not used on this list.

== The List ==
Genus	Status	Age	Location	Notes	Images
†Acanthacanthus	Valid.	Early Lochkovian (earliest Devonian).	Severnaya Zemlya, Russia.	A vesperaliid based on scales.	
†Acanthodopsis	Valid.	Carboniferous.	Europe, Australia.	An unusual acanthodid with tooth-like ossifications on its jaws.	
†Acanthopora	Valid.	Early Lochkovian (earliest Devonian).	Severnaya Zemlya, Russia.	A small ischnacanthid similar to Poracanthodes.	
†Acanthospina	Valid.	Early Lochkovian (earliest Devonian).	Severnaya Zemlya, Russia.	A probable ischnacanthiform with scales similar to hybodontiform sharks.	
†Acanthodes	Valid.	Devonian? to Cisuralian (Early Permian).	Europe, North America, China?	One of the most well-known acanthodians, a filter-feeding acanthodid acanthodiform.	
†Acritolepis	Valid.	Early Lochkovian (earliest Devonian).	Severnaya Zemlya, Russia.	Namesake of the ischnacanthiform family Acritolepidae.	
†Aganacanthus	Valid or junior synonym.	Mississippian / Early Carboniferous.	Scotland.	A possible gyracanthid known from a single worn fin spine, may be an indeterminate gnathostome or a junior synonym of Gyracanthus.	
†Altacollum	Valid.	Famennian (Late Devonian).	Belarus, Greenland.	An indeterminate acanthodian based on scales.	
†Angelacanthus	Valid.	Famennian (Late Devonian).	South Africa.	A diplacanthid based on a nearly complete specimen.	
†Ankylacanthus	Valid.	Emsian (Early Devonian).	Canada.	An acanthodian based on fin spines, possibly one of the oldest gyracanthids.	
†Antacanthus	Nomen dubium?	Mississippian / Early Carboniferous.	Belgium.	A possible gyracanthid known from a single fin spine.	
†Antarctonchus	Valid.	Givetian (Middle Devonian).	Antarctica.	An Antarctic acanthodian based on fin spine casts.	
†Apateacanthus	Valid.	Late Devonian.	New York, U.S.A.	Based on a fin spine with large denticles, sometimes mistaken for an ischnacanthiform jaw.	
†Archaeacanthus	Valid.	Eifelian to Givetian (Middle Devonian).	Europe.	Based on fin spines common in Middle Devonian strata of Siberia and Northeastern Europe.	
†Arcticacanthus	Valid.	Early Lochkovian to Emsian (Early Devonian).	Severnaya Zemlya, Russia.	A possible ischnacanthid based on scales.	
†Arenaceacanthus	Valid.	Wenlock to early Pridoli (Silurian).	Lithuania.	A probable ischnacanthid based on scales, common in Lithuania.	
†Atopacanthus	Valid.	Eifelian to Early Famennian (Middle Devonian to Late Devonian).	North America, Europe, Iran.	A widespread and long-lived ischnacanthid.	
†Brachyacanthus	Valid.	Lochkovian (Early Devonian).	Scotland.	A small climatiid from the Lower Old Red Sandstone of Scotland.	
†Bracteatacanthus	Valid.	Latest Pridoli (latest Silurian).	Lithuania.	A probable ischnacanthid based on scales.	
†Brochoadmones	Valid.	Lochkovian (Early Devonian).	Canada.	A deep-bodied and well-preserved "climatiiform" from the Man-On-The-Hill (MOTH) locality in the MacKenzie Mountains of Canada.	
†Bryantonchus	Valid.	Emsian (Early Devonian).	U.S.A.	A probable diplacanthiform based on fin spines.	
†Byssacanthoides	Valid.	Givetian (Middle Devonian).	Antarctica.	An Antarctic acanthodian based on fin spine casts.	
†Cacheacanthus	Valid.	Emsian (Early Devonian).	U.S.A.	Based on ischnacanthid jaw fragments from the western United States.	
†Campylodus	Nomen dubium?	Ludlow to Lochkovian? (late Silurian to earliest Devonian)?	Europe.	Jaw fragments probably belonging to indeterminate ischnacanthiforms.	
†Canadalepis	Valid.	Lochkovian? to Emsian (Early Devonian).	Asia, Australia, Canada.	A possible climatiid based on scales.	
†Carycinacanthus	Junior synonym.	Tournaisian (earliest Mississippian / Carboniferous).	Russia.	A junior synonym of Acanthodes lopatini.	
†Cassidiceps	Valid.	Lochkovian (Early Devonian).	Canada.	A toothless, deep-bodied MOTH locality acanthodian with complex head armor. Probably closely related to the acanthodiforms.	
†Cheiracanthoides	Valid.	Pridoli to Frasnian (latest Silurian to Late Devonian).	Worldwide.	A widespread and long-lasting possible climatiid based on scales.	
†Cheiracanthus	Valid.	Middle Devonian.	Europe.	The fairly common namesake of the acanthodiform family Cheiracanthidae.	
†Climatius	Valid.	Lochkovian (Early Devonian).	U.K., Portugal.	The namesake of the family Climatiidae.	
†Culmacanthus	Valid.	Givetian to Frasnian (Middle Devonian to Late Devonian).	Australia, Antarctica.	A distinctive diplacanthiform with reduced intermediate spines and large cheek plates.	
†Devononchus	Valid.	Givetian to Famennian (Middle Devonian to Late Devonian).	Europe.	Based on fin spines and scales common in the areas corresponding to Baltica.	
†Diplacanthus	Valid.	Middle Devonian to Late Devonian.	Scotland, Russia, South Africa, Canada?	The widespread, long-lasting, and fairly common namesake of the family Diplacanthidae and order Diplacanthiformes.	
†Doliodus	Valid (non-acanthodian).	Emsian (Early Devonian).	Canada.	A spiny stem-chondrichthyan which acts as a transitional form between acanthodians and non-acanthodian traditional chondrichthyans.	
†Eifellepis	Valid.	Emsian to Eifelian (Early Devonian to Middle Devonian).	Germany, Belgium.	An indeterminate acanthodian based on scales.	
†Erriwacanthus	Valid.	Pragian (Early Devonian).	U.K., Ukraine.	A climatiid with large and complex spines on its shoulder girdle.	
†Endemolepis	Valid.	Pridoli to Lochkovian (latest Silurian to Early Devonian).	Europe.	A possible climatiid based on scales.	
†Erymnacanthus	Valid.	Lochkovian (Early Devonian).	Canada.	A medium-sized MOTH locality ischnacanthid.	Erymnacanthus clivus jaw cast
†Eupleurogmus	Nomen dubium.	Mississippian / Early Carboniferous?	Australia.	A dubious taxon based on Acanthodes-like scales.	
†Euryacanthus	Valid.	Lochkovian (Early Devonian).	Canada.	A medium-sized MOTH locality ischnacanthid.	
†Euthacanthus	Valid.	Early Lochkovian (earliest Devonian).	U.K.	A slender acanthodian of uncertain affinities, despite its well-described anatomy.	
†Fallodentus	Valid.	Givetian (Middle Devonian).	Scotland.	A cheiracanthid acanthodiform closely related to Homalacanthus.	
†Fanjingshania	Valid.	Aeronian (Early Silurian, Llandovery Epoch).	China.	A climatiiform, one of the earliest known acanthodean genus.	Fanjingshania fin spine
†Fecundosquama	Valid.	Pridoli (late Silurian).	Lithuania.	A tchunacanthid based on scales.	
†Florestacanthus	Valid.	Late Frasnian to early Famennian (Late Devonian).	Colombia.	A diplacanthid diplacanthiform and one of the few acanthodians endemic to northwestern Gondwana (now South America).	
†Funicristata	Valid	Silurian (Přidolí)	U.S.A. (Nevada)	An acanthodian of uncertain affinities, based on scales.	
†Gemuendolepis	Valid?	Early Devonian.	Germany.	A poorly-described taxon based on scales.	
†Ginkgolepis	Valid.	Eifelian to Famennian? (Middle Devonian to Late Devonian).	Estonia, Russia.	A cheiracanthid acanthodiform based on scales.	
†Gladbachus	Valid (non-acanthodian?).	Givetian (Middle Devonian).	Germany.	A large filter-feeding stem-chondrichthyan, sometimes positioned among acanthodians despite its very dissimilar anatomy.	
†Gladiobranchus	Junior synonym?	Lochkovian (Early Devonian).	Canada.	A well-preserved diplacanthiform which may be synonymous with Uraniacanthus curtus.	
†Gomphacanthus	Nomen dubium?	Carboniferous.	England.	A possible gyracanthid based on a worn fin spine.	
†Gomphonchoporus	Valid.	Pridoli to Lochkovian (late Silurian to Early Devonian).	Europe, Australia, Canada, Greenland.	A widespread poracanthodid based on scales.	
†Gomphonchus	Valid.	Ludlow to Emsian? (late Silurian to Early Devonian).	Europe, Australia?, China?	A widespread ischnacanthid primarily based on scales.	
†Granulacanthus	Valid.	Late Wenlock or early Ludlow (Silurian).	Canada.	A possible ischnacanthiform based on distinctive fin spines.	
†Grenfellacanthus	Valid.	Latest Famennian (latest Devonian).	Australia.	One of the youngest and largest ischnacanthids, nearly a meter in length.	
†Gyracanthides	Valid.	Pragian to Visean (Early Devonian to Mississippian).	Worldwide.	A long-lasting and widespread gyracanthid with flattened fin spines.	
†Gyracanthus	Valid.	Lochkovian to Moscovian (Early Devonian to Pennsylvanian)	Europe, North America, Bolivia?	The long-lasting namesake of the family Gyracanthidae.	
†Hanilepis	Valid.	Late Ludlow (late Silurian).	China.	An indeterminate acanthodian based on scales.	
†Halimacanthodes	Valid.	Frasnian (Late Devonian).	Australia.	A howittacanthid acanthodiform, the only acanthodian known from the Gogo Formation lagerstätte.	
†Haplacanthus	Valid.	Eifelian to early Famennian (Middle Devonian to Late Devonian).	Europe, Greenland.	A cheiracanthid acanthodiform based on fin spines common in the areas corresponding to Baltica.	
†Helenacanthus	Valid? (non-acanthodian)	Emsian (Early Devonian).	Wyoming, U.S.A.	Has historically been considered acanthodian material, but probably armor from an actinolepid placoderm instead.	
†Helolepis	Junior synonym.	Emsian to Eifelian (Early Devonian to Middle Devonian).	Ohio, U.S.A.	A junior synonym of Cheiracanthoides comptus.	
†Homacanthus	Junior synonym?	Eifelian (Middle Devonian) to Pennsylvanian?	Europe, North America?	An acanthodian based on fin spines, though many of its species and specimens have been reassigned to other taxa.	
†Homalacanthus	Valid.	Frasnian (Late Devonian).	Canada.	A cheiracanthid acanthodiform known to have played a large role in the food chain of the Miguasha Lagerstätte.	
†Howittacanthus	Valid.	Frasnian (Late Devonian).	Australia.	The abundant namesake of the acanthodiform family Howittacanthidae.	
†Iranolepis	Valid.	Early Frasnian (Late Devonian).	Iran.	A possible climatiid based on scales.	
†Ischnacanthus	Valid.	Lochkovian (Early Devonian).	U.K., Portugal.	The abundant namesake of the ischnacanthiforms.	
†Kathemacanthus	Valid.	Lochkovian (Early Devonian).	Canada.	A Brochoadmones-like acanthodian from the MOTH locality, with a "necklace" of artichoke-shaped scales similar to those of chondrichthyans.	
†Laliacanthus	Valid.	Emsian to Eifelian (Early Devonian to Middle Devonian).	Europe, Saudi Arabia.	A possible climatiid based on scales.	
†Latviacanthus	Valid.	"upper Lower Devonian"	Latvia.	A possible climatiid with large ischnacanthiform-like jaw plates.	
†Lenacanthus	Valid.	Early Llandovery (earliest Silurian).	Russia.	A tchunacanthid based on scales, one of the earliest acanthodians.	
†Lijiangichthys	Valid.	Pragian (Early Devonian).	China.	An indeterminate acanthodian based on scales.	
†Lodeacanthus	Valid.	Frasnian (Late Devonian).	Latvia.	A mesacanthid acanthodiform known from a complete growth series.	
†Lupopsyroides	Valid.	Lochkovian (Early Devonian).	Canada.	An acanthodian-like MOTH locality fish with simple scales and no apparent bony skeleton apart from fin spines.	
†Lupopsyrus	Valid.	Lochkovian (Early Devonian).	Canada.	A MOTH locality acanthodian with two rows of enlarged scales on either side of its body.	
†Machaeracanthus	Valid.	Late Silurian to Eifelian (Middle Devonian).	Worldwide.	A widespread possible ischnacanthiform which occupies its own monotypic family.	Machaeracanthus fin spines
†Machaeraporus	Valid.	Pridoli to Lochkovian (late Silurian to Early Devonian).	Canada, Europe.	A poracanthodid ischnacanthiform based on scales.	
†Markacanthus	Valid.	Eifelian to Givetian (Middle Devonian).	Belarus, Scotland.	A fairly typical cheiracanthid acanthodiform.	
†Marsdenius	Valid.	Mississippian / Early Carboniferous.	England.	An obscure possible ischnacanthid based on a specimen which is now lost.	
†Melanoacanthus	Valid.	Emsian (Early Devonian).	Canada.	A small mesacanthid acanthodiform with broad head plates.	
†Mesacanthus	Valid.	Early Devonian to Middle Devonian.	Scotland.	The small but fairly common namesake of the acanthodiform family Mesacanthidae.	
†Milesacanthus	Valid.	Pragian to Frasnian (Early Devonian to Late Devonian).	Worldwide.	A widespread diplacanthid diplacanthiform.	
†Minioracanthus	Valid.	Eifelian to Givetian (Middle Devonian).	Europe.	An indeterminate acanthodian based on scales.	
†Modicucollum	Valid.	Famennian (Late Devonian).	Belarus.	An indeterminate acanthodian based on scales.	
†Monopleurodus	Valid.	Pridoli (late Silurian).	Estonia.	Poorly-known.	
†Monospina	Valid.	Late Pridoli (latest Silurian).	Latvia, Lithuania.	An acritolepid ischnacanthiform based on scales.	
†Nerepisacanthus	Valid.	Ludlow to late Pridoli (late Silurian).	Canada.	An acritolepid ischnacanthiform and one of the most well-preserved Silurian acanthodians.	
†Nobilesquama	Valid.	Lochkovian to Emsian (Early Devonian).	Russia.	An indeterminate acanthodian based on scales.	
†Nodocosta	Valid.	Emsian to Frasnian (Early Devonian to Late Devonian).	Europe, U.S.A.	A possible climatiid based on fin spines.	
†Nodonchus	Junior synonym?	Lochkovian (Early Devonian).	England, Saudi Arabia?	Based on fin spines, but may be a junior synonym of Parexus.	
†Nostolepis	Valid.	Wenlock to early Frasnian (mid-Silurian to Late Devonian).	Worldwide.	One of the most widespread, long-lasting, and abundant acanthodians based primarily on scales.	
†Nostovicina	Valid.	Pridoli to Emsian (late Silurian to Early Devonian).	Worldwide.	A widespread indeterminate acanthodian based on scales and fin spines.	
†Obruchevacanthus	Valid.	Late Lochkovian (Early Devonian).	Spain.	A poracanthodid ischnacanthiform closely related to Trundlelepis.	
†Obtusacanthus	Valid.	Lochkovian (Early Devonian).	Canada.	An unusual MOTH locality gnathostome, likely an acanthodian closely related to true chondrichthyans. Despite lacking teeth, it was a predator with specialized lip scales.	
†Onchus	Valid.	Late Llandovery? to Famennian (early Silurian to Late Devonian).	Europe, North America.	A possible ischnacanthiform based on fin spines; may be one of the oldest known acanthodians.	
†Oracanthus	Valid?	Mississippian.	Europe, North America.	A poorly-known gyracanthid based on fin spines.	
†Orcadacanthus	Valid.	Middle Devonian.	Scotland.	A small mesacanthid based on species formerly placed in Acanthodes and Mesacanthus.	
†Paranostolepis	Valid.	Late Devonian.	Canada.	A poorly-known indeterminate acanthodian based on scales.	
†Parexus	Valid.	Lochkovian (Early Devonian).	U.K.	A climatiid with a massive first dorsal fin spine.	
†Paucicanthus	Valid.	Lochkovian (Early Devonian).	Canada.	A MOTH locality acanthodian lacking spines on the pectoral and pelvic fins.	
†Pechoralepis	Valid.	Pridoli to Givetian (late Silurian to Middle Devonian).	Russia, Antarctica.	An acritolepid ischnacanthiform based on scales.	
†Peregrinosquama	Valid.	Lower Emsian (Early Devonian).	Russia.	An indeterminate acanthodian based on scales.	
†Persacanthus	Valid.	Frasnian (Late Devonian).	Iran, Russia, North America.	An ischnacanthid very closely related to Atopacanthus.	
†Pinnacanthus	Valid.	Emsian (Early Devonian).	Wyoming, U.S.A.	An acanthodian based on fin spines.	
†Plectrodus	Valid.	Ludlow (late Silurian).	England.	An ischnacanthid commonly confused with Ischnacanthus.	
†Protodus	Valid (non-acanthodian).	Late Pragian to Emsian (Early Devonian).	Canada.	Chondrichthyan teeth originally misidentified as belonging to acanthodiians, due to their similarity to the teeth of a Nostolepis specimen from Scotland.	
†Podoliacanthus	Valid.	Pridoli? to Lochkovian (late Silurian? to Early Devonian).	Greenland, Ukraine.	A small ischnacanthid.	
†Poracanthodes	Valid.	Ludlow? to Pragian (late Silurian to Early Devonian).	Europe, North America.	Namesake of the ischnacanthiform family Poracanthodidae.	
†Promesacanthus	Valid.	Lochkovian (Early Devonian).	Canada.	A mesacanthid acanthodiform from the MOTH locality, with small prepectoral spines similar to "climatiiforms".	
†Protogonacanthus	Valid.	Frasnian (Late Devonian).	Germany.	A cheiracanthid acanthodiform preferring a marine environment.	
†Pruemolepis	Valid?	Emsian to Eifelian (Early Devonian to Middle Devonian).	Europe.	A possible climatiid based on scales similar to some species of Nostolepis.	
†Pseudacanthodes	Valid or junior synonym.	Moscovian (Pennsylvanian / Late Carboniferous).	Czechia.	An eel-like acanthodid acanthodiform, possibly a junior synonym of Traquairichthys.	
†Ptomacanthus	Valid.	Lochkovian (Early Devonian).	England, Ukraine.	One of the few non-Acanthodes acanthodians with a well-described braincase and gill system, helping to clarify the group's relations with other fishes.	
†Ptychodictyon	Valid.	Emsian to Givetian (Early Devonian to Middle Devonian).	Europe, U.S.A.	A diplacanthid diplacanthiform based on scales.	
†Pucapampella	Valid (non-acanthodian?).	Eifelian to Givetian (Middle Devonian).	Bolivia.	A chondrichthyan-like braincase sometimes positioned among acanthodians.	
†Radioporacanthodes	Valid.	Ludlow to Emsian (late Silurian to Early Devonian).	Worldwide.	A widespread poracanthodid ischnacanthiform primarily based on scales.	
†Rhadinacanthus	Valid.	Emsian to Famennian? (Early Devonian to Late Devonian).	Europe, China, Canada.	A diplacanthid diplacanthiform similar to, but distinct from, Diplacanthus.	
†Rockycampacanthus	Valid.	Late Emsian (Early Devonian).	Australia.	A distinctive marine ischnacanthid.	
†Rohonilepis	Valid.	Ludlow to Pridoli (late Silurian).	Lithuania, Latvia.	A possible ischnacanthid based on scales.	
†Sabrinacanthus	Valid.	Lochkovian (Early Devonian).	England.	A climatiid with a large shoulder girdle.	
†Serpensiugum	Valid.	Famennian (Late Devonian).	Belarus.	An indeterminate acanthodian based on scales.	
†Serradentus	Valid.	Late Givetian (Middle Devonian).	Spitsbergen.	A medium-sized ischnacanthiform.	
†Sevyacanthus	Valid.	Emsian (Early Devonian).	U.S.A.	A climatiid with complex spine plates.	
†Sinacanthus	Valid (non-acanthodian).	Silurian to Early Devonian.	Asia.	Namesake of the sinacanthids, a group of spined gnathostomes which are likely chondrichthyans.	
†Striacanthus	Valid.	Pragian to Frasnian (Early Devonian to Late Devonian).	Europe, Australia.	A diplacanthiform based on elongated fin spines.	
†Taemasacanthus	Valid.	Late Emsian (Early Devonian).	Australia.	A moderately large marine ischnacanthid.	
†Taimyrolepis	Valid.	Pridoli to Lochkovian (late Silurian to Early Devonian).	Russia.	A possible poracanthodid ischnacanthiform based on scales.	
†Tareyacanthus	Valid.	Pragian to Emsian (Early Devonian).	Europe, Australia.	A possible climatiid based on scales.	
†Tchunacanthus	Valid.	Late Llandovery (early Silurian).	Russia.	A tchunacanthid based on scales.	
†Teneracanthus	Valid.	Late Emsian to Famennian (Early Devonian to Late Devonian).	Australia, Belgium.	A mesacanthid acanthodiform closely related to Lodeacanthus.	
†Tetanopsyrus	Valid.	Lochkovian (Early Devonian).	Canada.	A distinctive diplacanthiform from the MOTH locality.	
†Traquairia	Junior synonym.	Moscovian (Pennsylvanian / Late Carboniferous).	Czechia.	Junior synonym of Traquiairichthys.	
†Traquairichthys	Valid.	Moscovian to Leonardian? (Pennsylvanian / Late Carboniferous to Early Permian).	Czechia, Greenland?, Texas, U.S.A.?	An eel-like acanthodid acanthodiform.	
†Triazeugacanthus	Valid.	Frasnian (Late Devonian).	Canada.	A mesacanthid acanthodiform from the Miguasha Lagerstätte, with one of the best-known ontogenetic series of all acanthodians.	
†Tricuspicanthus	Valid.	Lochkovian (Early Devonian).	Canada.	A small MOTH locality ischnacanthid.	
†Trundlelepis	Valid.	Lochkovian to Pragian (Early Devonian).	Australia, Nevada, U.S.A.?	A poracanthodid ischnacanthiform based on scales.	
†Uraniacanthus	Valid.	Lochkovian (Early Devonian).	U.K., Canada?	A long-spined gladiobranchid diplacanthiform, sometimes misidentified as an ischnacanthiform.	
†Utahacanthus	Valid.	Namurian (early Pennsylvanian / Late Carboniferous).	Utah, U.S.A.	An acanthodid acanthodiform with three prominent otoliths.	
†Vernicomacanthus	Valid.	Lochkovian (Early Devonian).	U.K.	A rare climatiid with denticulated fin spines.	
†Verrucasquama	Valid.	Famennian (Late Devonian).	Belarus.	An indeterminate acanthodian based on scales.	
†Vesperalia	Valid.	Late Pridoli (late Silurian).	Lithuania.	A vesperaliid based on scales.	
†Watsonacanthus	Valid.	Emsian to Eifelian (Early Devonian to Middle Devonian).	Europe, Australia.	A possible climatiid based on scales.	
†Westrichus	Valid.	Carboniferous - Permian boundary	Germany	An acanthodiform.	
†Wetteldorfia	Valid.	Lochkovian to Eifelian (Early Devonian to Middle Devonian).	Germany, Spain, Australia, Saudi Arabia.	A possible climatiid based on scales.	
†Xylacanthus	Valid.	Late Wenlock (mid-Silurian) to Pragian (Early Devonian).	Spitsbergen, Canada.	An ischnacanthid containing both the largest species of acanthodians (X. grandis at 2.5 meters long) and one of the oldest species (X. kenstewarti).	
†Yealepis	Valid.	Ludlow (late Silurian).	Australia.	A large but indeterminate acanthodian which seems to lack fin spines.	
†Zemlyacanthus	Valid.	Lochkovian (Early Devonian).	Severnaya Zemlya, Russia.	One of the few poracanthodid ischnacanthiforms known from articulated skeletons.	

== See also ==
- Acanthodians
- List of placoderms
- List of prehistoric bony fish
- List of prehistoric cartilaginous fish
- List of prehistoric jawless fish
