= Wood Bay Formation =

Geologic formation in Svalbard, Norway

- Stratigraphic range: Early Pragian–Late Emsian; ~410.8–393.47 Ma
- Type: Formation
- Unit of: Andrée Land Group
- Sub-units: See text
- Underlies: Grey Hoek Formation
- Overlies: Ben Nevis Formation
- Thickness: 3,000 metres (9,800 ft)

Location
- Region: Spitsbergen, Svalbard
- Country: Norway

The Wood Bay Formation is a geologic formation found on the island of Spitsbergen, Svalbard in Norway. It preserves fossils dating back to the Pragian and Emsian stages of the Devonian period.

== Stratigraphy ==
The Wood Bay Formation is divided into two main areas: the Woodfjorden area in the north and the Dicksonfjorden–Austfjorden area in the south. In the Woodfjorden area, the formation is further split into the Sigurdfjellet, Kapp Kjeldsen, Keltiefjellet, and Stjørdalen divisions, which are distinguished by the types of fish fossils found there. The Dicksonfjorden–Austfjorden area is divided into the Austfjorden, Dicksonfjorden, and Verdalen members based on differences in sedimentary features. These differing methods of classifying the formation's sub-units have led to difficulty in determining how one area corresponds to the other.

== Paleoenvironment ==
The Wood Bay Formation was likely coastal and may represent an estuarine or fjord-like environment. The presence of a Lingula fossil recovered from the formation might suggest some degree of marine influence.

== Fossil content ==
=== Acanthodians ===
Acanthodians are a group of stem–chondrichthyans found in Paleozoic deposits around the world. They are commonly represented in the fossil record by their spines and scales. The Acanthodian fauna of the Wood Bay Formation is not as well understood as the other animal groups present, but Xylacanthus grandis, the largest known acanthodian, is exclusively found here.

Acanthodians
Genus	Species	Division	Notes	Images
"Gomphonchus"	"G." sp.	Sigurdfjellet Division	An ischnacanthid.	
"Nostolepis"	"N." sp.	Sigurdfjellet Division	A climatiid.	
Striacanthus	S. overathensis	Sigurdfjellet Division; Kapp Kjeldsen Division	A diplacanthiform of uncertain placement. Originally described as the form genus "Onchus" overathensis.	
Acanthodes?	A.? sp.	Kapp Kjeldsen Division	An acanthodid. Only known within the Wood Bay Formation from scale fossils.	
Cheiracanthus?	C.? sp.	Kapp Kjeldsen Division	A cheiracanthid. Only known within the Wood Bay Formation from scale fossils.	
Ptychodictyon?	P.? sp.	Kapp Kjeldsen Division	A diplacanthiform. Only known within the Wood Bay Formation from scale fossils.	
Xylacanthus	X. grandis	Kapp Kjeldsen Division	An ischnacanthid.	
Xylacanthus	X. minutus	Keltiefjellet Division	An ischnacanthid.	
Mesacanthus	M. grandis	Keltiefjellet Division	A mesacanthid.	

=== Agnathans ===
Agnathans are by far the most species–rich and well–known animal group present in the Wood Bay Formation. Osteostracans alone account for over one third of the total genera present in the formation. All Agnathans known from the formation are considered "Ostracoderms", an informal grouping of armored jawless fish from the Paleozoic.

==== Heterostracans ====
Heterostracans
Genus	Species	Division	Notes	Images
Woodfjordaspis	W. felixi	Sigurdfjellet Division	A pteraspidid.	
Xylaspis	X. prima	Sigurdfjellet Division	A protopteraspidid. Previously named Spitsbergaspis prima.	
Doryaspis	D. arctica	Sigurdfjellet Division; Kapp Kjeldsen Division	A doryaspidid. D. lyktensis and D. minor were previously assigned to Grummantaspis lyktensis and Ennosveaspis minor respectively.	
Doryaspis	D. groenhorgensis	Kapp Kjeldsen Division	A doryaspidid. D. lyktensis and D. minor were previously assigned to Grummantaspis lyktensis and Ennosveaspis minor respectively.	
Doryaspis	D. lyktensis	Kapp Kjeldsen Division	A doryaspidid. D. lyktensis and D. minor were previously assigned to Grummantaspis lyktensis and Ennosveaspis minor respectively.	
Doryaspis	D. nathorsti	Kapp Kjeldsen Division; Keltiefjellet Division	A doryaspidid. D. lyktensis and D. minor were previously assigned to Grummantaspis lyktensis and Ennosveaspis minor respectively.	
Doryaspis	D. minor	Stjørdalen Division	A doryaspidid. D. lyktensis and D. minor were previously assigned to Grummantaspis lyktensis and Ennosveaspis minor respectively.	
Gigantaspis	G. minima	Sigurdfjellet Division	A pteraspidid. G. laticephala was previously assigned to Zascinaspis laticephala.	
Gigantaspis	G. isachseni	Kapp Kjeldsen Division	A pteraspidid. G. laticephala was previously assigned to Zascinaspis laticephala.	
Gigantaspis	G. laticephala	Kapp Kjeldsen Division	A pteraspidid. G. laticephala was previously assigned to Zascinaspis laticephala.	
Gigantaspis	G. bocki	Kapp Kjeldsen Division	A pteraspidid. G. laticephala was previously assigned to Zascinaspis laticephala.	

==== Osteostracans ====
Osteostracans
Genus	Species	Division	Notes	Images
Benneviaspis	B. grandis	Sigurdfjellet Division	A benneviaspidid. B. loevgreeni was changed from B. lövgreeni, as diacritics are not allowed in scientific names according to the International Code of Zoological Nomenclature.	
Benneviaspis	B. loevgreeni	Sigurdfjellet Division	A benneviaspidid. B. loevgreeni was changed from B. lövgreeni, as diacritics are not allowed in scientific names according to the International Code of Zoological Nomenclature.	
Benneviaspis	B. maxima	Sigurdfjellet Division	A benneviaspidid. B. loevgreeni was changed from B. lövgreeni, as diacritics are not allowed in scientific names according to the International Code of Zoological Nomenclature.	
Norselaspis	N. glacialis	Sigurdfjellet Division	A kiaeraspidid.	
Belonaspis	B. puella	Sigurdfjellet Division	A boreaspidid.	
Machairaspis	M. isachseni	Sigurdfjellet Division	A zenaspidid.	
Machairaspis	M. battaili	Kapp Kjeldsen Division	A zenaspidid.	
Cephalaspis	"C." curta	Sigurdfjellet Division	A cephalaspid. Previously considered a wastebasket taxon. Many species assigned to Cephalaspis have been reassigned to different genera or are considered dubious.	
Cephalaspis	"C." sp.	Sigurdfjellet Division; Kapp Kjeldsen Division	A cephalaspid. Previously considered a wastebasket taxon. Many species assigned to Cephalaspis have been reassigned to different genera or are considered dubious.	
Boreaspis	"B." ceratops	Sigurdfjellet Division	A boreaspidid.	
Boreaspis	"B." ginsburgi	Sigurdfjellet Division	A boreaspidid.	
Boreaspis	"B." batoides	Kapp Kjeldsen Division	A boreaspidid.	
Boreaspis	B. puella	Kapp Kjeldsen Division	A boreaspidid.	
Boreaspis	B. triangularis	Kapp Kjeldsen Division	A boreaspidid.	
Boreaspis	"B." intermedia	Sigurdfjellet Division; Kapp Kjeldsen Division	A boreaspidid.	
Boreaspis	B. macrorhynchus	Sigurdfjellet Division; Kapp Kjeldsen Division	A boreaspidid.	
Boreaspis	B. rostrata	Sigurdfjellet Division; Kapp Kjeldsen Division	A boreaspidid.	
Boreaspis	B. spinicornis	Kapp Kjeldsen Division; Keltiefjellet Division	A boreaspidid.	
Spatulaspis	S. robusta	Kapp Kjeldsen Division; Keltiefjellet Division	A boreaspidid. Previously assigned to Boreaspis.	
Spatulaspis	S. costata	Kapp Kjeldsen Division; Keltiefjellet Division	A boreaspidid. Previously assigned to Boreaspis.	
Axinaspis	A. whitei	Kapp Kjeldsen Division	A kiaeraspidid.	
Acrotomaspis	A. instabilis	Kapp Kjeldsen Division		
Dicranaspis	D. circinus	Kapp Kjeldsen Division	A boreaspidid.	
Dicranaspis	D. curtirostris	Kapp Kjeldsen Division; Keltiefjellet Division	A boreaspidid.	
Dicranaspis	D. gracilis	Kapp Kjeldsen Division; Keltiefjellet Division	A boreaspidid.	
Hildenaspis	H. digitalis	Keltiefjellet Division	A cephalaspidid.	
Gustavaspis	G. trinodus	Keltiefjellet Division; Stjørdalen Division	Previously assigned to Acrotomaspis trinodus.	
Diademaspis	D. poplinae	Sigurdfjellet Division; Kapp Kjeldsen Division; Keltiefjellet Division; Stjørdalen Division	A zenaspidid.	
Parameteoraspis	P. oblonga	Sigurdfjellet Division; Kapp Kjeldsen Division	A parameteoraspidid. previously assigned to Cephalaspis and previously named Meteoraspis. P. hoegi and P. borealis are considered nomina dubia. There are an additional four undescribed species, at least three of which belong to the Kapp Kjeldsen Division.	
Parameteoraspis	P. caroli	Kapp Kjeldsen Division	A parameteoraspidid. previously assigned to Cephalaspis and previously named Meteoraspis. P. hoegi and P. borealis are considered nomina dubia. There are an additional four undescribed species, at least three of which belong to the Kapp Kjeldsen Division.	
Parameteoraspis	P. oberon	Kapp Kjeldsen Division	A parameteoraspidid. previously assigned to Cephalaspis and previously named Meteoraspis. P. hoegi and P. borealis are considered nomina dubia. There are an additional four undescribed species, at least three of which belong to the Kapp Kjeldsen Division.	
Parameteoraspis	P. lata	Kapp Kjeldsen Division	A parameteoraspidid. previously assigned to Cephalaspis and previously named Meteoraspis. P. hoegi and P. borealis are considered nomina dubia. There are an additional four undescribed species, at least three of which belong to the Kapp Kjeldsen Division.	
Parameteoraspis	P. laticornis	Kapp Kjeldsen Division	A parameteoraspidid. previously assigned to Cephalaspis and previously named Meteoraspis. P. hoegi and P. borealis are considered nomina dubia. There are an additional four undescribed species, at least three of which belong to the Kapp Kjeldsen Division.	
Parameteoraspis	P. gigas	Keltiefjellet Division	A parameteoraspidid. previously assigned to Cephalaspis and previously named Meteoraspis. P. hoegi and P. borealis are considered nomina dubia. There are an additional four undescribed species, at least three of which belong to the Kapp Kjeldsen Division.	
Parameteoraspis	P. hoegi	Keltiefjellet Division	A parameteoraspidid. previously assigned to Cephalaspis and previously named Meteoraspis. P. hoegi and P. borealis are considered nomina dubia. There are an additional four undescribed species, at least three of which belong to the Kapp Kjeldsen Division.	
Parameteoraspis	P. lanternaria	Keltiefjellet Division	A parameteoraspidid. previously assigned to Cephalaspis and previously named Meteoraspis. P. hoegi and P. borealis are considered nomina dubia. There are an additional four undescribed species, at least three of which belong to the Kapp Kjeldsen Division.	
Parameteoraspis	P. menoides	Keltiefjellet Division	A parameteoraspidid. previously assigned to Cephalaspis and previously named Meteoraspis. P. hoegi and P. borealis are considered nomina dubia. There are an additional four undescribed species, at least three of which belong to the Kapp Kjeldsen Division.	
Parameteoraspis	P. moythomasia	Stjørdalen Division	A parameteoraspidid. previously assigned to Cephalaspis and previously named Meteoraspis. P. hoegi and P. borealis are considered nomina dubia. There are an additional four undescribed species, at least three of which belong to the Kapp Kjeldsen Division.	
Parameteoraspis	P. semicircularis	Stjørdalen Division	A parameteoraspidid. previously assigned to Cephalaspis and previously named Meteoraspis. P. hoegi and P. borealis are considered nomina dubia. There are an additional four undescribed species, at least three of which belong to the Kapp Kjeldsen Division.	
Parameteoraspis	P. borealis	Unknown	A parameteoraspidid. previously assigned to Cephalaspis and previously named Meteoraspis. P. hoegi and P. borealis are considered nomina dubia. There are an additional four undescribed species, at least three of which belong to the Kapp Kjeldsen Division.	
Nectaspis	N. peltata	Kapp Kjeldsen Division	A cephalaspidid.	
Nectaspis	N. areolata	Kapp Kjeldsen Division; Keltiefjellet Division; Stjørdalen Division	A cephalaspidid.	
Nectaspis	N. dellei	Stjørdalen Division	A cephalaspidid.	

==== Thelodonts ====
Thelodonts
Genus	Species	Division	Notes	Images
Turinia	T. pagei	Sigurdfjellet Division	A coelolepid.	
Sigurdia	S. lata	Sigurdfjellet Division		
Amaltheolepis	A. sp.	Sigurdfjellet Division; Keltiefjellet Division	A turiniid.	
Amaltheolepis	A. winsnesi	Stjørdalen Division	A turiniid.	

=== Osteichthyans ===
Osteichthyans, or bony fish, are primarily represented by sarcopterygians in the Wood Bay Formation. Osteichthyans in general are poorly represented at the formation compared to other animal groups.

Osteichthyans
Genus	Species	Division	Notes	Images
Powichthys	P. spitsbergensis	Sigurdfjellet Division	A powichthyid.	
Porolepis	P. sp.	Sigurdfjellet Division	A porolepidid. P. elongata and P. brevis may be junior synonyms of P. spitsbergensis.	
Porolepis	P. elongata	Kapp Kjeldsen Division	A porolepidid. P. elongata and P. brevis may be junior synonyms of P. spitsbergensis.	
Porolepis	P. brevis	Keltiefjellet Division	A porolepidid. P. elongata and P. brevis may be junior synonyms of P. spitsbergensis.	
Porolepis	P. spitsbergensis	Unknown	A porolepidid. P. elongata and P. brevis may be junior synonyms of P. spitsbergensis.	
Janvierpaucidentes	J. tuulingi	Dicksonfjorden Member (= Keltiefjellet Division)	A dipnoan.	
Heimenia	H. ensis	Stjørdalen Division	A porolepidid.	
Orvikuina	O. sp.	Stjørdalen Division	A palaeoniscoid.	

=== Placoderms ===
Placoderms are a group of armored fish that lived during the Late Silurian and Devonian periods of the Paleozoic. They represent the second most well–known group of animals from the Wood Bay Forrmation.

Placoderms
Genus	Species	Division	Notes	Images
Sigaspis	S. lepidophora	Sigurdfjellet Division	An actinolepid or actinolepidoid arthrodire placoderm.	
Arctaspis	A. sp. indet.	Sigurdfjellet Division	A phlyctaeniid.	
Arctaspis	A. holtedahli	Kapp Kjeldsen Division	A phlyctaeniid.	
Arctaspis	A. kiaeri	Kapp Kjeldsen Division	A phlyctaeniid.	
Arctaspis	A. maxima	Keltiefjellet Division	A phlyctaeniid.	
Dicksonosteus	D. arcticus	Kapp Kjeldsen Division	A phlyctaeniid.	
Heintzosteus	H. brevis	Kapp Kjeldsen Division	An arctolepid. Previously assigned to Jaekelaspis brevis.	
Lehmanosteus	L. hyperboreus	Kapp Kjeldsen Division	A basal arthrodire.	
Elegantaspis	E. reticornis	Unknown, potentially the Kapp Kjeldsen Division	A phlyctaeniid.	
Lataspis	L. brevicornis	Unspecified, at least one species found in the Kapp Kjeldsen Division	Previously named Plataspis.	
Lataspis	L. rotundicornis	Unspecified, at least one species found in the Kapp Kjeldsen Division	Previously named Plataspis.	
Arctolepis	A. decipens	Keltiefjellet Division	A phlyctaeniid.	
Actinolepis	A. sp.	Stjørdalen Division	An actinolepid.	
Herasmius	H. granulatus	Stjørdalen Division	A heterosteid.	
Heterogaspis	H. gigantea	Stjørdalen Division	A phlyctaeniid.	
Homosteus	H. arcticus	Stjørdalen Division	A homostiid. Also referred to as Homostius.	

=== Invertebrates ===
Invertebrate fossils from the Wood Bay Formation are scarce and are mostly represented by microfossils.

Invertebrates
Genus	Species	Division	Notes	Images
"Spirorbis"	"S." sp.	Kapp Kjeldsen Division	An extant genus of tube-forming annelid worm that was once assigned to many fossil specimens. A 2009 study determined that all instances of the genus from before the Jurassic period likely represent microconchid molluscs instead. This would include the specimens from the Wood Bay Formation.	
Pterygotus?	P.? sp.	Kapp Kjeldsen Division	Fragments of a large eurypterid that are assigned to Pterygotus. Occurs alongside Gigantaspis laticephala.	
Lingula	L. sp	"Uppermost Wood Bay Formation"	A modern brachiopod with a fossil record potentially extending to the Cambrian period. Only represented in the Wood Bay Formation by one specimen.	
Isochilina	I. isochilinoides	Unspecified	An ostracod crustacean.	
Holtedahlia	H. teres	Unspecified	An ostracod crustacean.	

=== Plants ===
Plants
Genus	Species	Division	Notes	Images
Trochiliscus?	T.? sp.	Kapp Kjeldsen Division	A charophyte algae.	
"Hostinella"	"H." sp.	Kapp Kjeldsen Division	A form genus that represents the branching stems of a plant. Previously named Hostimella.	

=== Ichnotaxa ===
Ichnotaxa
Genus	Species	Division	Notes
Cruziana	C. polaris	Kapp Kjeldsen Division; Keltiefjellet Division	Traces of a trilobite or trilobite-like arthropod.
PIanolites	P. isp.	Keltiefjellet Division	
Merostomichnites	M. isp.	Keltiefjellet Division	The trackways of an arthropod, potentially a eurypterid.
Rusophycus	R. isp.	Keltiefjellet Division	Arthropod resting traces.
Lockeia	L. isp.	Keltiefjellet Division	
Isopodichnus	I. isp.	Keltiefjellet Division; Stjørdalen Division	The resting or feeding traces of an arthropod. Similar in appearance to Cruziana.
Taenidium	T. isp.	Keltiefjellet Division; Stjørdalen Division	
Skolithos	S. helicoidalis	Verdalen Member (= Stjørdalen Division)	A vertical, helical tube interpreted as the trace of a plant rhizolith or animal burrow.
Undichna	U. septemsulcata	"Middle Wood Bay Formation"	A swimming trace of an acanthodian, possibly Diplacanthus. One of the oldest vertebrate trace fossils known.
Svalbardichnus	S. trilobus	"Upper Wood Bay Formation"	Feeding traces of a supposedly Nahecaris-like phyllocardid crustacean.
Beaconites	B. baretti	Unspecified	Found predominantly in sandstone beds with wave marks.
Siskemia	S. cf. elegans	Unspecified	Interpreted as the trackways of an arthropod pushing itself through the sediment.

== See also ==
- List of fossiliferous stratigraphic units in Norway
- Old Red Sandstone
