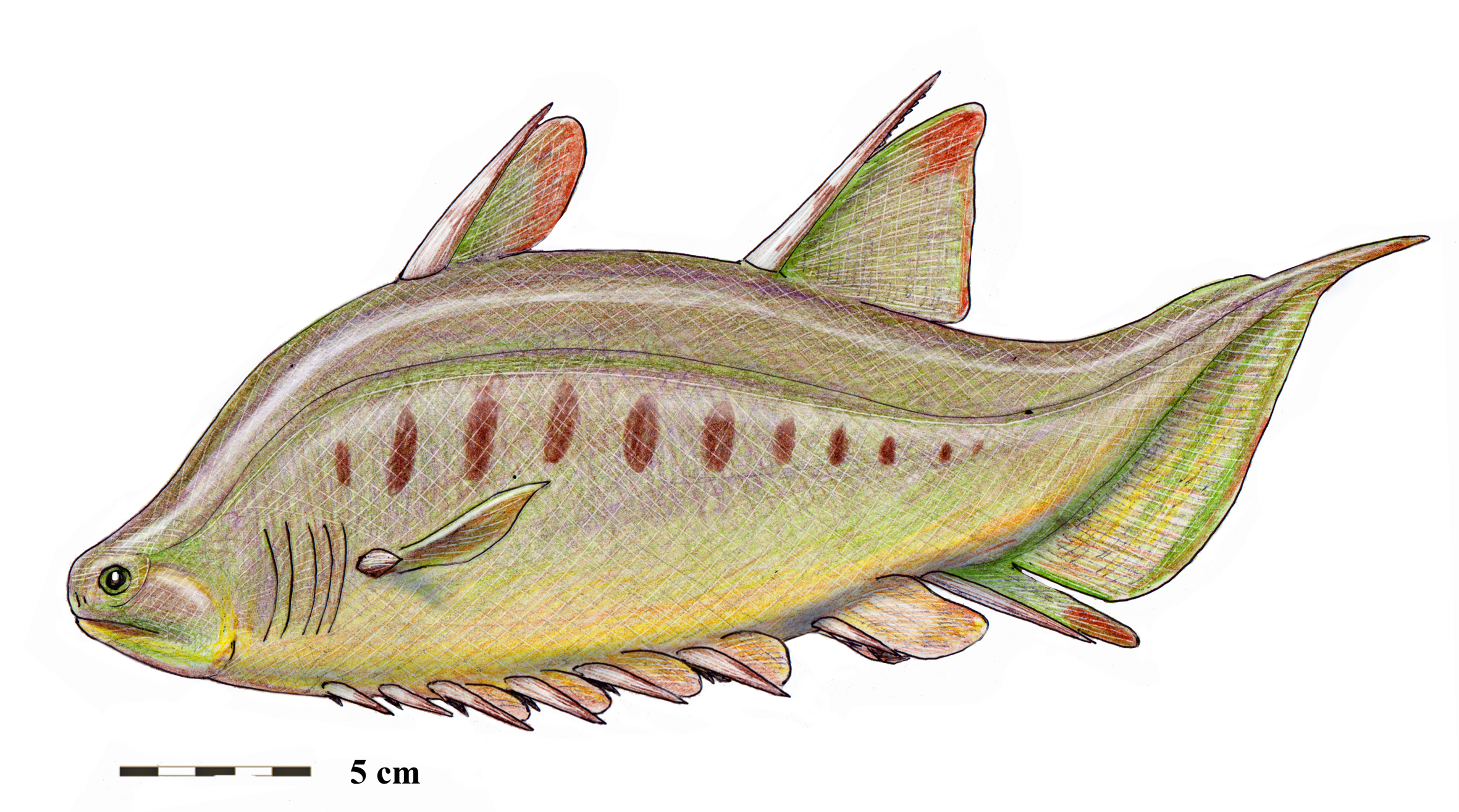

Scientific classification
- Kingdom: Animalia
- Phylum: Chordata
- Class: Acanthodii
- Order: incertae sedis
- Suborder: Brochoadmonoidei Gagnier & Wilson, 1996
- Family: Brochoadmonidae Bernacsek & Dineley, 1977
- Genus: Brochoadmones Bernacsek & Dineley, 1977
- Species: B. milesi

Binomial name
- Brochoadmoanes milesi Bernacsek & Dineley, 1977

= Brochoadmones =

Brochoadmones Temporal range: Early Devonian

Extinct genus of cartilaginous fishes

Brochoadmones was an extinct genus of acanthodian that lived during the Devonian in what is now Canada. It is the only genus in the suborder Brochoadmonoidei, whose relationship to other acanthodian orders remains is currently unknown.

== Discovery ==
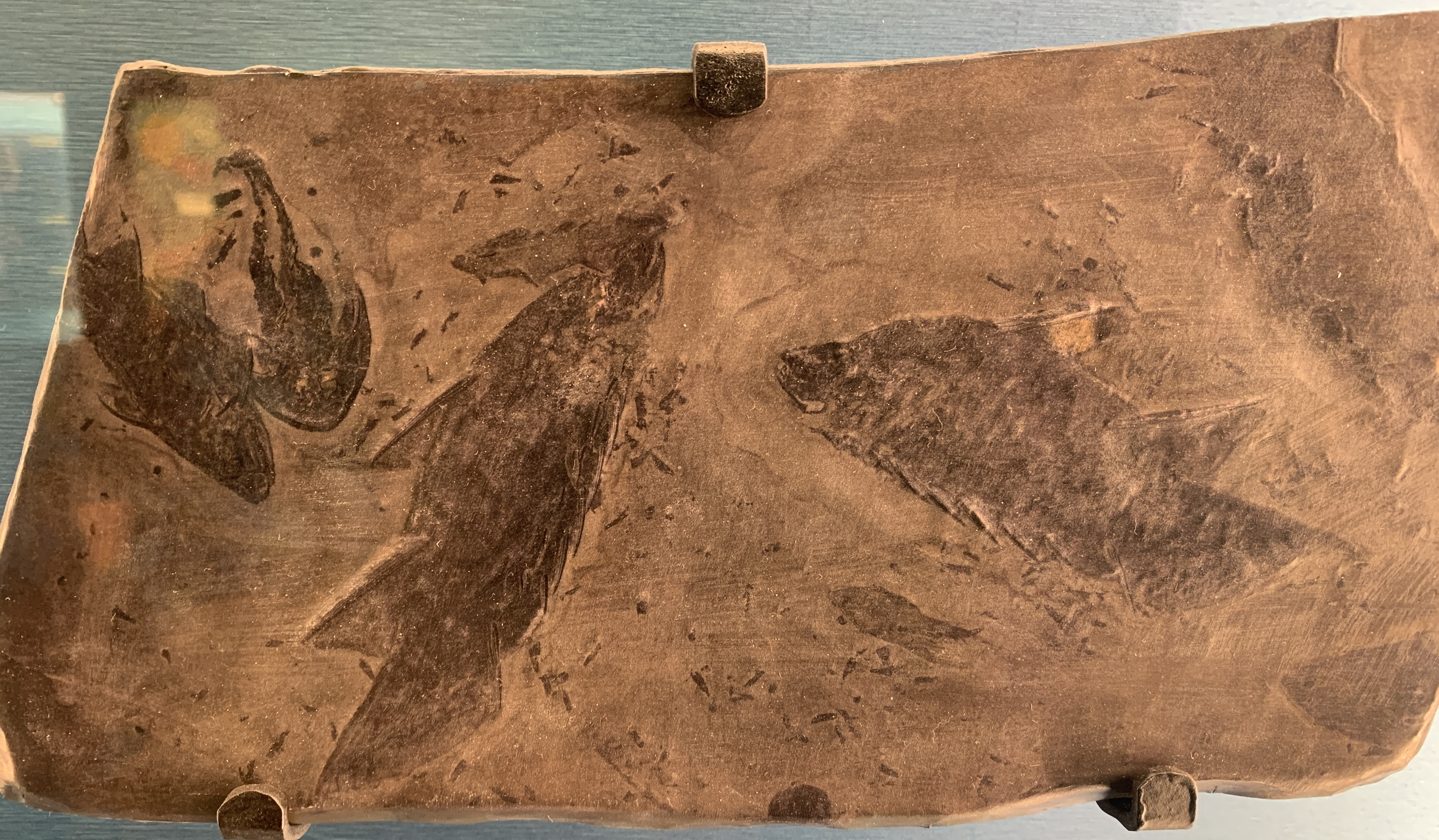
Cast of The 'Wonder Block', Royal Tyrrell Museum of Palaeontology.

Brochoadmones was originally described after the discovery of two poorly preserved specimens at the MOTH locality in 1977, which preserved enough to discern a new genus in a new family, but did not have enough material to accurately reconstruct the animal. This holotype included some poorly preserved scales, tooth whorls, and fin spines.

Several more specimens were discovered after the holotype, but all were fragmentary until 1996, when a fossil slab known as the "Wonder Block" was unearthed, preserving 8 fossils representing 7 species, including two specimens of Brochoadmones. These two nearly intact fossils would provide the basis for an accurate reconstruction of the animal.

== Description ==
Brochoadmones is characterized by its compressed, deep body and prominent hump. Its head shape is unusual, tapering into a snout with large orbits. The mouth itself is large, possessing at least 10 to 11 tooth whorls, which would rotate to replace worn teeth or substitute bigger teeth as the animal grew.

Five external gill slits run across each side of the body, alongside a pair of short and flat pectoral spines. Six closely spaced pairs of prepelvic spines run on the underside, which may have been somewhat mobile and possessed prepelvic finlets. These are followed by a pair of pelvic spines, which support large and broad fins. The anal-fin spine supports a fin, which reinforces the large, epicercal caudal fin. Two dorsal fins run along the back, each paired with a large dorsal spine.

The prepelvic finlets of Brochoadmones are especially significant, as such a feature had never before been observed on a vertebrate. These finlets possess scales, and are similar to theoretical ideas of what an intermediate stage in the evolution from ventrolateral fins to paired fins.

== Paleoecology ==
Brochoadmones was a freshwater predatory animal, as indicated by evidence of partially digested acanthodians in the stomach of an individual. Though its proportions may seem unusual, several modern fish possess analogous body plans, including Malawi eyebiters, Knifefishes, and Humpback groupers. Brochoadmones may have hunted prey similarly to these modern fish, relying on stealth and capturing it with a short lunge. If its prepelvic finlets were capable of movement, they may have aided the animal in making subtle motions during a stealthy approach. The large caudal fin may have supported ambush hunting, as they are typically used for rapid acceleration over short distances.

== Taxonomy ==
The relationship Brochoadmones shares with other acanthodians has been unclear since its discovery. Its initial describers, Bernacsek and Dineley, erected a new family for the genus, Brochoadmonidae, but remained unsure if the fish belong in the order Climatiiformes or Ischnacanthiformes. The features of Brochoadmones would remain so unique that it would later be placed into its own suborder, Brochoadmonoidei.

Brochoadmones would receive little attention taxonomically due to their incomplete remains, and even after two nearly complete fossils were uncovered, the genus still had no derived features to establish a relationship with any specific acanthodian order, leaving its placement uncertain. However, the lack of any plate-like armor or prepectoral spines, ornamentation of median fin spines, and head scale structure suggest a closer relationship with Ischnacanthiformes or Acanthodiformes than Climatiiformes.

Kathemacanthus was initially believed to be closely related to Brochoadmones, and shared the same suborder. But later evidence suggested Kathemacanthus wasn't an acanthodian at all, but rather a chondrichthyan, and as such was removed from the suborder and class entirely, leaving Brochoadmones the only representative of its subclass. However, later studies place the genera more closely together, with the genera either both being chondrichthyes proper or the genera both being stem chondrichthyes.
