= Sandwick Fish Bed =

- Stratigraphic range: Devonian
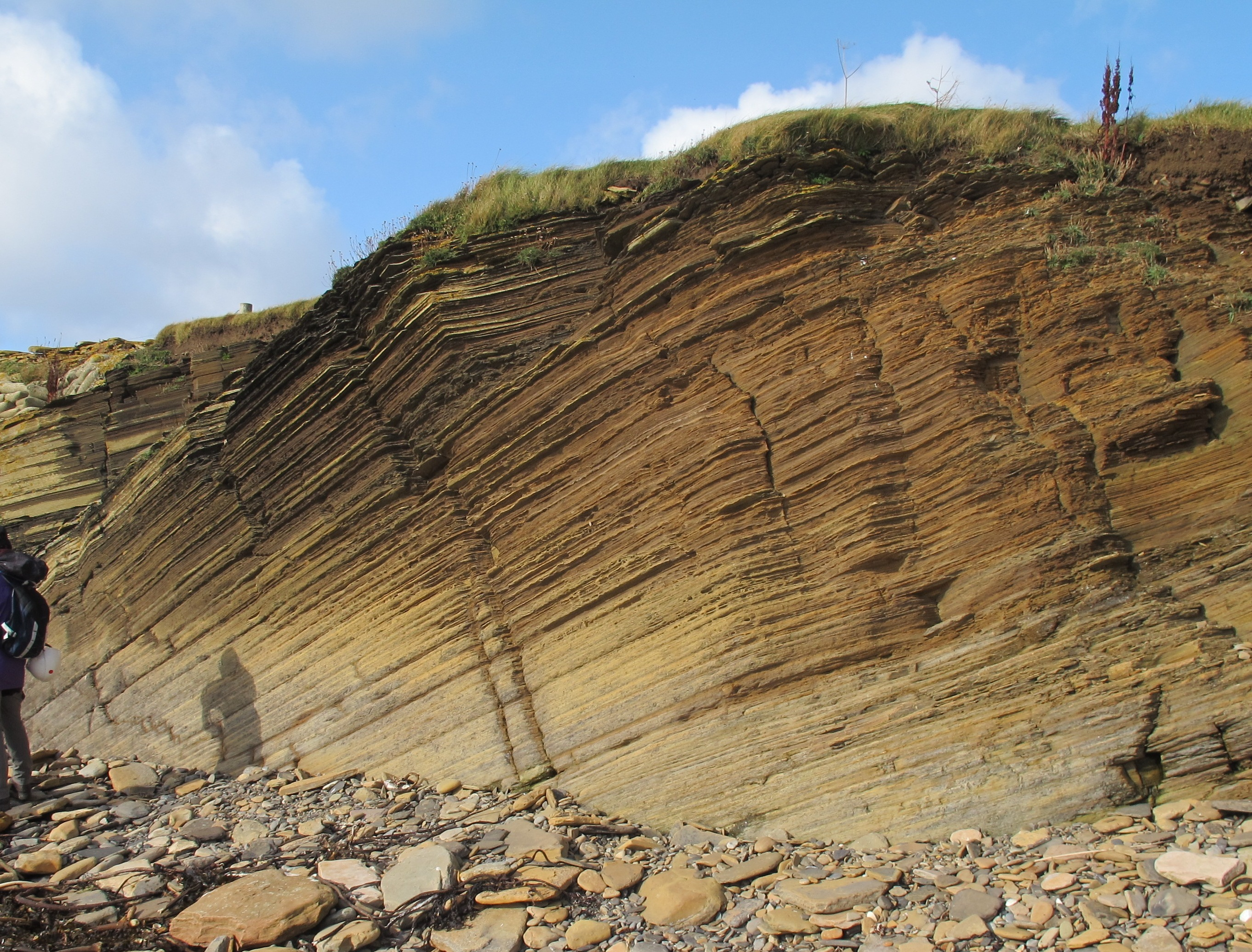
- Sandwick Fish Bed
- Type: Member
- Unit of: Upper Stromness Flagstone Formation
- Thickness: ≥50 m

Location
- Region: Scotland
- Country: United Kingdom

Type section
- Named for: Sandwick, Orkney

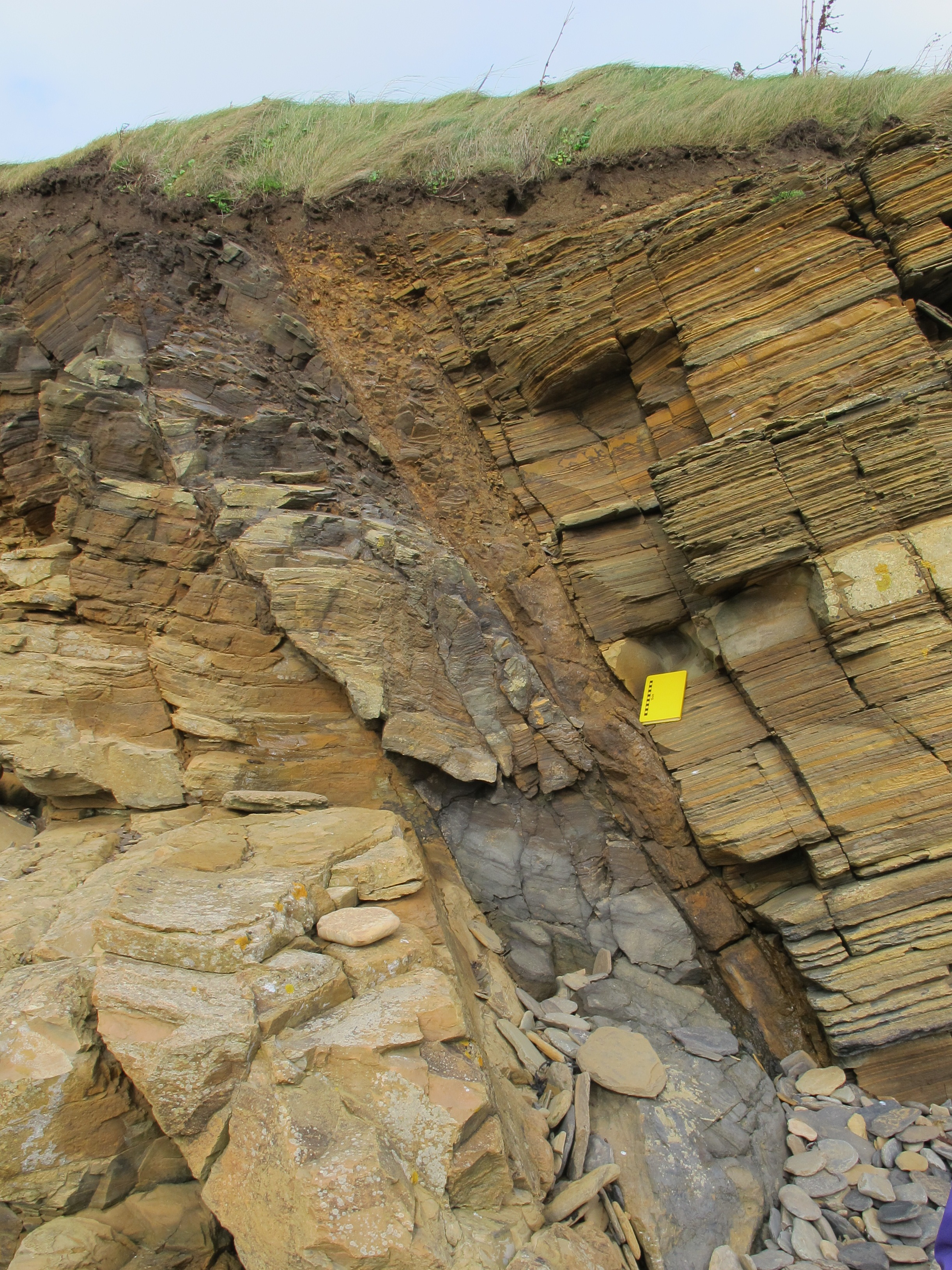
Normal fault within Sandwick Fish Bed

The Sandwick Fish Bed (SFB) is the basal member of the Upper Stromness Flagstone Formation in Mainland, Orkney, Scotland. It preserves fossils dating back to the Eifelian stage of the Devonian period and is particularly known for its fish fauna. It represents the deposits of an unusually deep and persistent lake within the Orcadian Basin during the Middle Devonian. It is correlated with several other fish beds in northeastern Scotland, particularly the Achanarras Fish Bed Member in Caithness, which lies stratigraphically at the boundary between the Upper and Lower Caithness Flagstone Subgroups.

== Occurrence ==
The SFB had been found at several localities in the Sandwick area of western Mainland, Orkney and in the northern part of Hoy. It is well-exposed on the west shore near Stromness and in the quarry at Cruaday, which remains intermittently operational. It was widely worked for flagstones in other small quarries across the Sandwick area, but these are no longer accessible. There are also coastal exposures along the cliffs, but these are generally hard to access.

== Depositional environment ==
During the period represented by the Devonian flagstone formations of Orkney and Caithness, the Orcadian Basin was occupied by a lake or series of lakes. The sedimentation within these lakes was cyclical in nature, with both "wet" and "dry" periods. During wet periods the lake(s) were permanent and lacustrine sediments were deposited in the form of finely laminated (varved) fine-grained alternations of carbonate, organic and siliciclastic (mud to silt grade) layers on a sub-millimetre scale. These varves are interpreted to be annual, reflecting seasonal changes in deposition in a thermally stratified lake. Above and below the deep lake facies, the sequence records lake(s) that were shallower, unstratified and more ephemeral, with evidence of occasional desiccation in the form of shrinkage cracks (possibly subaqueous). The cycles continue with an interpreted playa lake environment, with the common development of shrinkage cracks, ripple-bedded fine sandstones and pseudomorphs after gypsum, consistent with only ephemeral lake development. Most of the Sandwick Fish Bed is represented by the first two of these lithological associations. The SFB and other correlative sequences were deposited in an unusually deep and persistent lake that extended over much of the Orcadian Basin, including areas close to the basin margins, such as at Tynet Burn. Depending on assumptions, this gives a range of maximum lake size during this period of between 35,000 and 60,000 km^{2}. An analysis of fish faunas both in the lacustrine Orcadian Basin and marginal marine sequences in the Baltic region strongly suggests a connection between the two areas during lake high stands, with fish moving between the lake(s) and the neighbouring seas.

== Correlation to other fish beds ==
The Achanarras Fish Bed Member in central Caithness shows many similarities to the SFB, with comparable lithological variations, thickness and fish fauna. Similar occurrences are known from Shetland, the Melby Fish Bed (developed within a dominantly sandy sequence), from the Niandt Limestone in southeastern Caithness, and other localities farther south, including Cromarty, Edderton, Nairnside, Clava, Tynet Burn and Gamrie. An occurrence at Baligill is now discounted, as the diagnostic fish P.gunni is no longer accepted as being present.

== Regional setting ==
The deposition of the middle Devonian sequences of the Orcadian Basin are interpreted to be controlled by active extensional tectonics, with the development of half-graben depocentres. Within this active tectonic framework, the main control on sedimentation is interpreted to be climatic, with the cyclic changes in lithology, bed thickness and sedimentary structures reflecting variations in lake level controlled by periods of higher and lower influx from the basin's hinterland.

== Fossils ==
=== Fish ===
==== List of taxa ====
Taxon	Species	Notes
Diplacanthus	D. crassimus	
	D. striatus	
Rhadinacanthus	R. longispinus	
Cheiracanthus	C. murchisoni	
	C. grandispinus	
Osteolepis	O.macrolepidotus	
Dipterus	D. valenciennis	
Gyroptychius	G. agassizi	
Coccosteus	C. cuspidatus	
Pterichthyodes	P. milleri	
Palaeospondylus	P. gunni	
Cheirolepis	C. trailli	
Mesacanthus		
Glyptolepis	G. paucidens	

==== Distribution within the SFB ====
The taxa collected from the SFB are not uniformly vertically distributed within the unit. Dipterus are the first fossils to be encountered towards the base of the SFB and the last to be found towards the top of the unit, suggesting that they tolerated a wider range of conditions than other members of the fauna.

== See also ==
- List of fossiliferous stratigraphic units in Scotland
