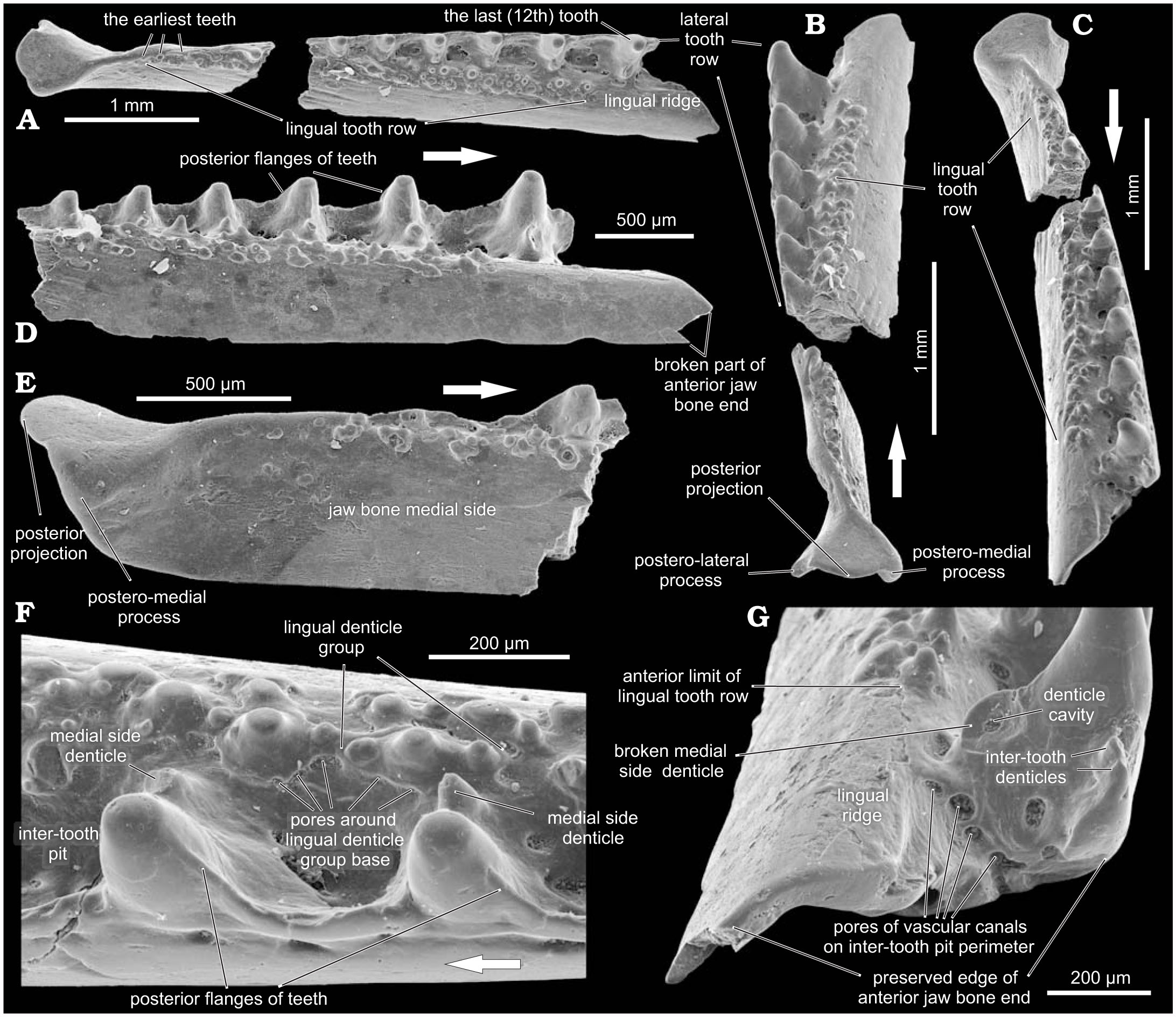
- Holotype jaw bone of P. zychi

Scientific classification
- Kingdom: Animalia
- Phylum: Chordata
- Class: Chondrichthyes
- Subclass: †Acanthodii
- Order: †Ischnacanthiformes
- Family: †Podoliacanthidae
- Genus: †Podoliacanthus; Voichyshyn & Szaniawski, 2012

= Podoliacanthus =

Podoliacanthus Temporal range: Early Devonian

Extinct genus of cartilaginous fishes

Podoliacanthus is an extinct genus of Acanthodii ("spiky sharks") which existed in what is now Greenland and Ukraine during the early Devonian period. It was described by Victor Voichyshyn and Hubert Szaniawski in 2012, and the type species is Podoliacanthus zychi. It also contains three presently undescribed species.
