= Poracanthodes =

Poracanthodes Temporal range: Přídolí Epoch, 418.7–416 Ma

Scientific classification
- Kingdom: Animalia
- Phylum: Chordata
- Class: Chondrichthyes
- Subclass: †Acanthodii
- Order: †Ischnacanthiformes
- Family: †Ischnacanthidae
- Genus: †Poracanthodes

Genus of prehistoric fish

Poracanthodes is a genus of acanthodian fish belonging to the Ischnacanthidae family. It lived during the Late Silurian period. Its fossils have been discovered in Estonia and China. It was a carnivore.
