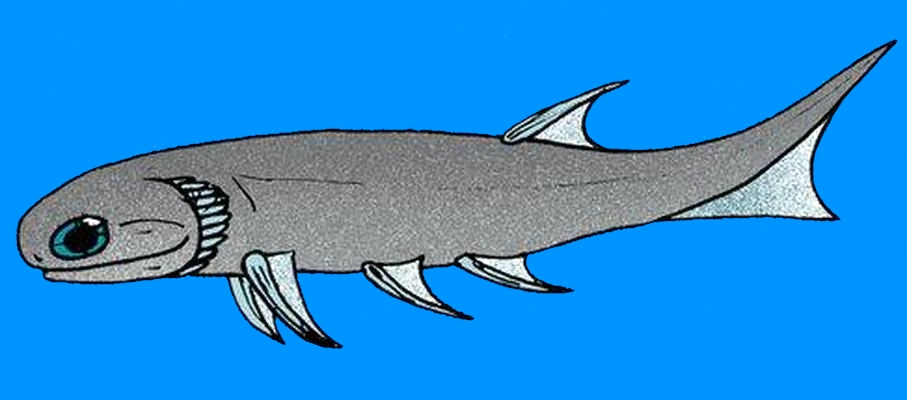
- Life reconstruction of M. pusillus

Scientific classification
- Kingdom: Animalia
- Phylum: Chordata
- Class: Chondrichthyes
- Subclass: †Acanthodii
- Order: †Acanthodiformes
- Family: †Mesacanthidae
- Genus: †Mesacanthus; Traquair, 1888

Species
- M. mitchelli; M. pusillus

= Mesacanthus =

Mesacanthus Temporal range: Devonian

Extinct genus of cartilaginous fishes

Mesacanthus ('middle spine') is an extinct genus of acanthodian fish from the lower to middle Devonian Scotland. It is among the more primitive of the Devonian acanthodians.

== Description ==
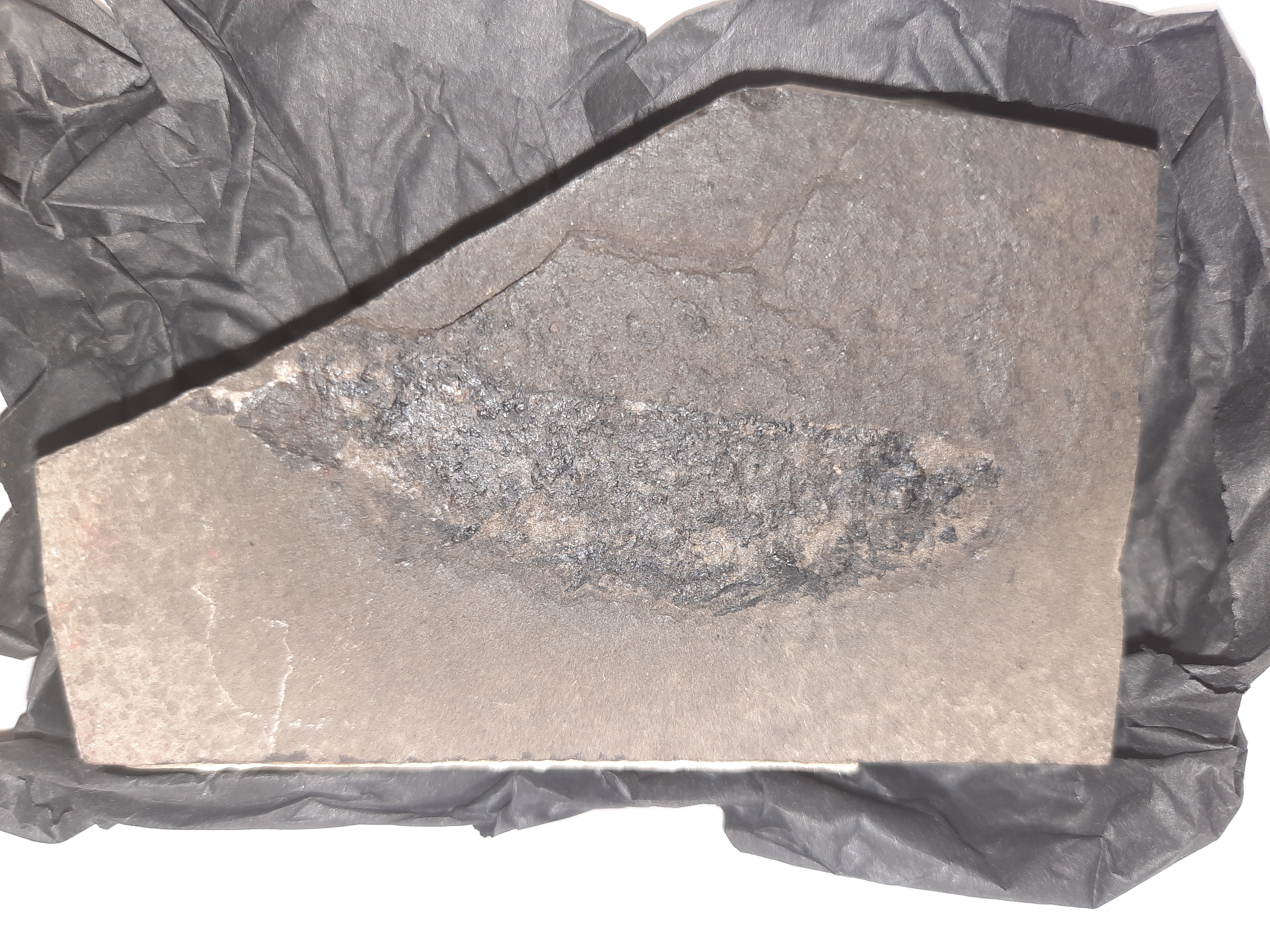
Mesacanthus peachi fossil from the Sandwick Fish Beds of Quoyloo, Scotland.

Mesacanthus body fossils have pectoral, pelvic, anal and dorsal fin spines, as well as a pair of prepelvic spines, which are intermediate between the pectoral and pelvic fin spines. They also have small, unornamented, diamond shaped scales. According to Agassiz, the genus also has a distinct tail in which the upper lobe extends to a sharp point and the lower lobe forms a small triangle. Overall the genus is small (average length = 30mm) and fairly conservative, anatomically speaking, for acanthodians.

== Taxonomy ==
The genus was erected by Ramsay Traquair in 1888 to accommodate certain species that had been previously assigned to Acanthodes by Louis Agassiz. These species included Mesacanthus mitchelli, Mesacanthus pusillus, Mesacanthus peachi and Mesacanthus coriaceus. The genus is found in both Lower Old Red Sandstone and Middle Old Red Sandstone assemblages, with M. pusillus, M. peachi and M. coriaceus known from the Middle Devonian and M. mitchelli being the only known species from the Lower Devonian. Arthur Smith Woodward formally synonymized M. peachi and M. coriaceus in 1891. In 2015 a study published in PeerJ reassessed the two remaining Middle Devonian species (M. pusillus and M. peachi) and found that they also could not be distinguished from one another. Hence, only two species from the Orcadian Basin and Midland Valley areas of Scotland are currently considered to be valid: M. mitchelli from the Lower Devonian and M. pusillus from the Middle Devonian.

== Morphology ==
Mesacanthus is a small acanthodians with the body is slender and laterally compressed. The Mesacanthus has dorsal, anal, pectoral, and pelvic fins supported by unjointed spines.

== See also ==
- List of acanthodians
