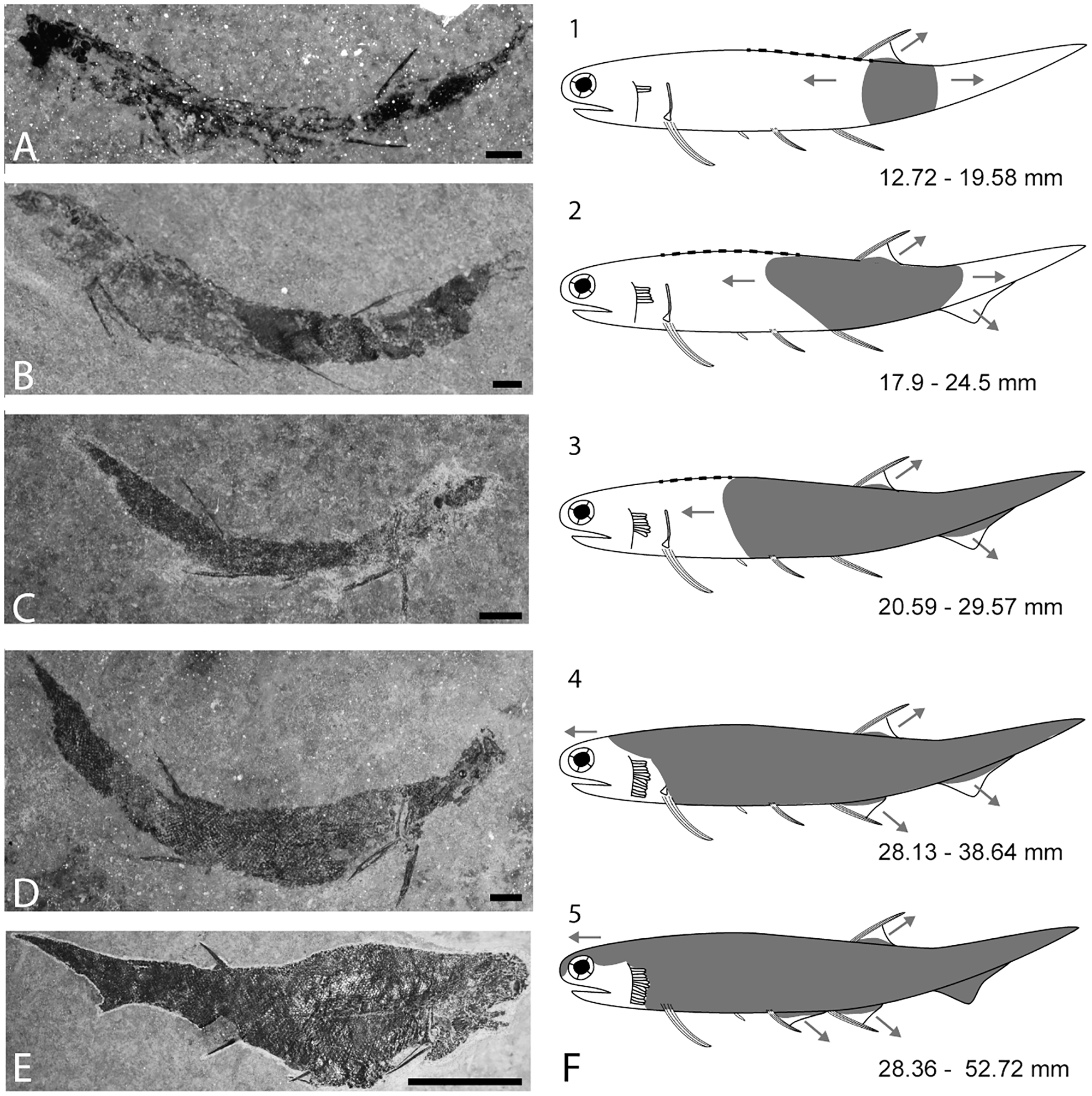
- Development of the squamation pattern in T. affinis

Scientific classification
- Kingdom: Animalia
- Phylum: Chordata
- Class: Chondrichthyes
- Subclass: †Acanthodii
- Order: †Acanthodiformes
- Family: †Acanthodidae
- Genus: †Triazeugacanthus; Miles, 1966
- Species: †T. affinis

Binomial name
- †Triazeugacanthus affinis Whiteaves, 1887

= Triazeugacanthus =

Triazeugacanthus Temporal range: Devonian

Extinct genus of cartilaginous fishes

Triazeugacanthus is an extinct genus of spiny shark from the Devonian of Canada. It contains a single species, Triazeugacanthus affinis. With total length up to 5.272 centimetres (2.076 in), it is known from multiple ontogenetic stages.

== Palaeobiology ==
=== Life history ===
In larval T. affinis, the first anatomical features to develop are the notochordal elements and the eye lenses. Otoliths form shortly afterwards. The first appendicular elements to develop are the scapulocoracoid and the pectoral spine.
