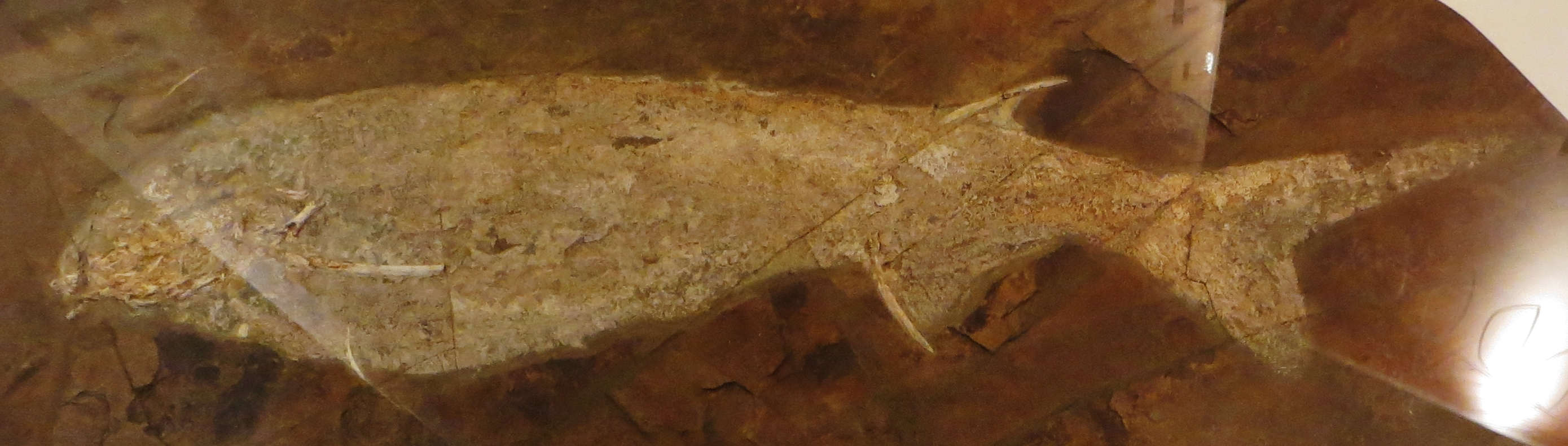
- A fossil of Westrichus

Scientific classification
- Domain: Eukaryota
- Kingdom: Animalia
- Phylum: Chordata
- Class: †Acanthodii
- Order: †Acanthodiformes
- Family: †Acanthodidae
- Genus: †Westrichus; Heidtke, 2003

Type species
- Westrichus kraetschmeri Heidtke, 2003

Species
- W. kraetschmeri; W. tholeyi (Heidtke, 1990)

= Westrichus =

Westrichus Temporal range: 297 Ma Asselian

Extinct genus of cartilaginous fishes

Westrichus is an extinct acanthodian which lived in the Lower Permian of Germany. It contains two species: the type species, Westrichus kraetschmeri, and Westrichus tholeyi, the latter of which was previously assigned to Acanthodes.

== Description ==
This animal was very similar to the genus Acanthodes, however it was equipped with an extremely elongated pelvic fin; it started behind the head and ended just before the retracted anal fin. The appearance, compared to that of Acanthodes, was therefore much more massive, however, the head was smaller. It had length up to 75 centimetres (30 in), and like all acanthodians, Westrichus had large spines on its fins. The dorsal fin was small and pointed backward, and was located near the larger and elongated anal fin.

== Classification ==
First described in 2003 on the basis of fossils found in the Meisenheim Formation, Westrichus is considered a very specialised acanthodian. Like many derived representatives of the group, Westrichus had a low number of fins. It is considered a close relative of the genus Acanthodes, in the family Acanthodidae.

== Palaeobiology ==
Westrichus fed on small crustaceans, and occasionally small fish, amphibians and even members of its own species.
