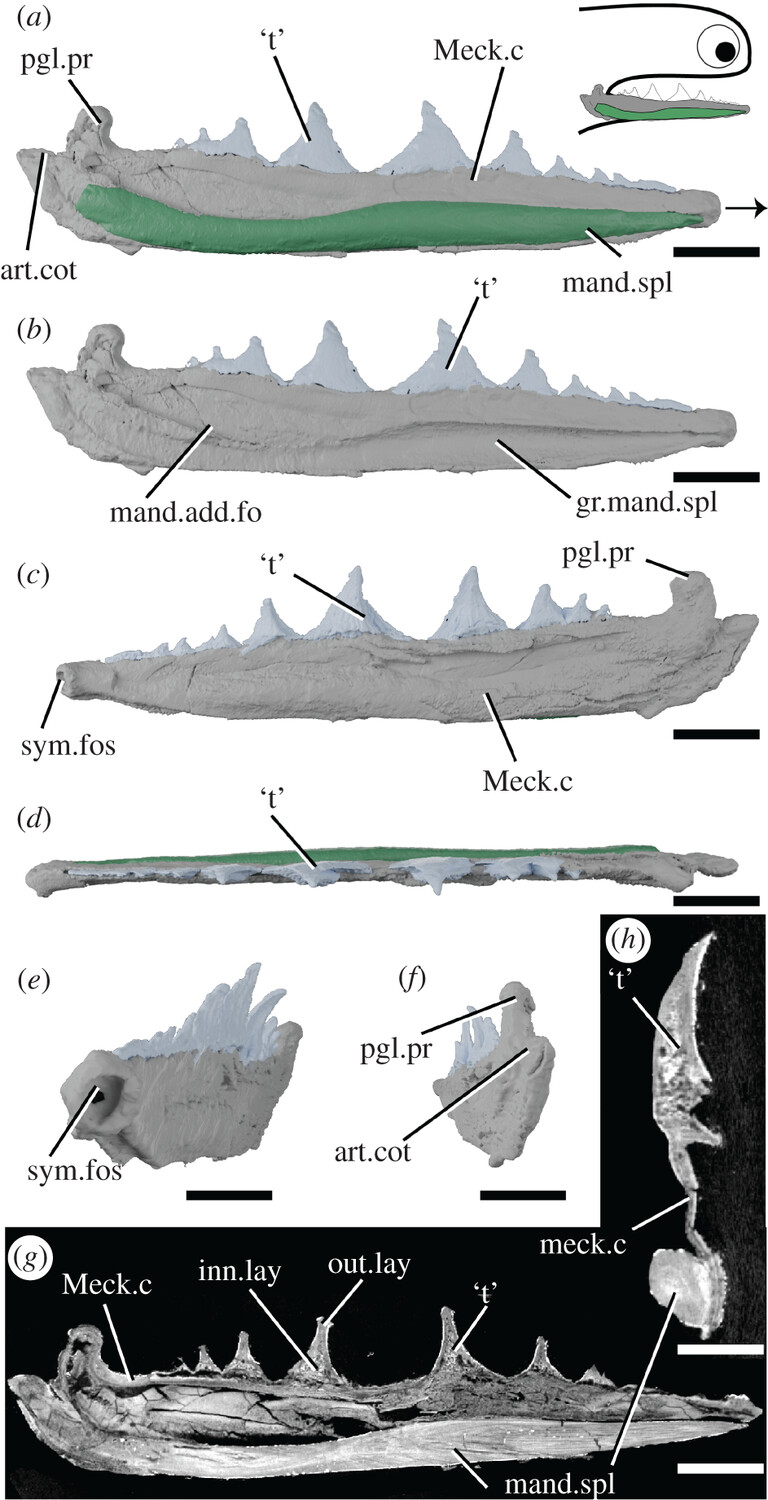
- Right lower jaw of Acanthodopsis sp.

Scientific classification
- Kingdom: Animalia
- Phylum: Chordata
- Class: Chondrichthyes
- Subclass: †Acanthodii
- Order: †Acanthodiformes
- Family: †Acanthodidae
- Genus: †Acanthodopsis; Hancock and Atthey, 1868

Species
- †A. russelli; †A. wardi; †A. microdon

= Acanthodopsis =

Acanthodopsis Temporal range: Mississippian–Pennsylvanian

Extinct genus of cartilaginous fishes

Acanthodopsis is a genus of acanthodian fish from the family Acanthodidae. It lived during the Carboniferous period. Acanthodopsis fossils have been discovered in Australia and England. The largest species could have reached up to 75 cm in length while others were much smaller.
