= Xylacanthus (fish) =

Xylacanthus Temporal range: Wenlock–Pragian

Scientific classification
- Domain: Eukaryota
- Kingdom: Animalia
- Phylum: Chordata
- Class: †Acanthodii
- Order: †Ischnacanthiformes
- Family: †Ischnacanthidae
- Genus: †Xylacanthus; Tor Ørvig, 1967

Species
- †X. kenstewarti; †X. minutus; †X. grandis

Extinct genus of Acanthodian fish

Xylacanthus is a genus of extinct acanthodian fish belonging to the family Ischnacanthidae. It lived during the Silurian to Devonian periods. Three species of Xylacanthus are known, X. kenstewarti from Late Wenlock to Early Ludlow from the Mackenzie Mountains in Canada, X. minutus from Lochkovian of Spitsbergen in Norway, and X. grandis from Siegenian of Spitsbergen. X. grandis was the largest acanthodian with 35 cm (14 in) long jaw bone and estimated total length of 2.5 m (8 ft 2 in).
