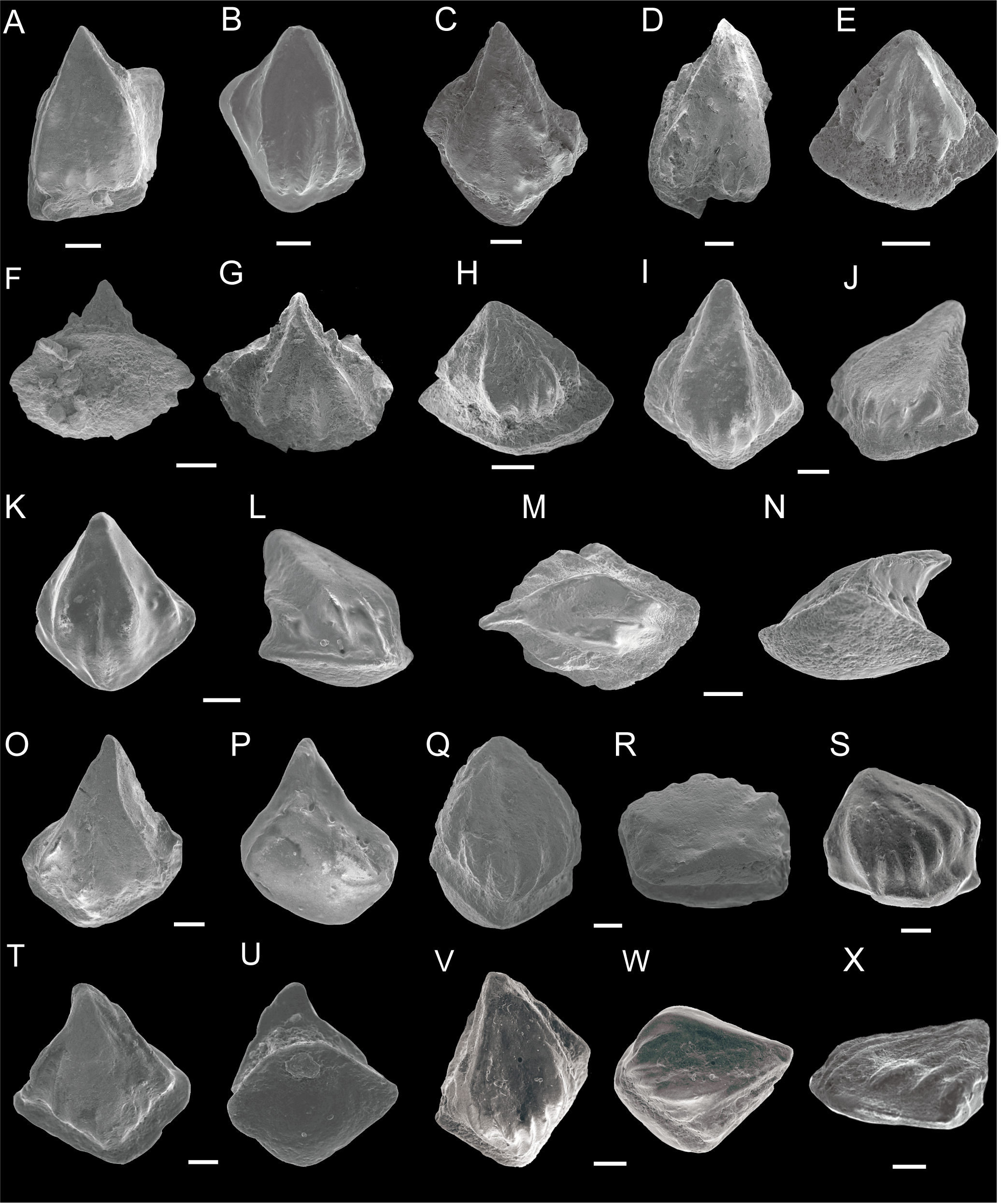
- Scales of M. striata (A–H), M. amplifica (I–P) and M. consueta (Q–X)

Scientific classification
- Kingdom: Animalia
- Phylum: Chordata
- Class: Acanthodii
- Order: Climatiiformes
- Family: Climatiidae
- Genus: Nostolepis Pander, 1856

= Nostolepis =

Nostolepis Temporal range: Homerian–Givetian

Extinct genus of cartilaginous fishes

Nostolepis is an extinct genus of acanthodian fish which lived from the Silurian (Wenlock) to the Middle Devonian (Givetian). Members of the genus include Nostolepis gracilis and Nostolepis striata. Nostolepis might have preyed on trilobites, such as Deiphon
