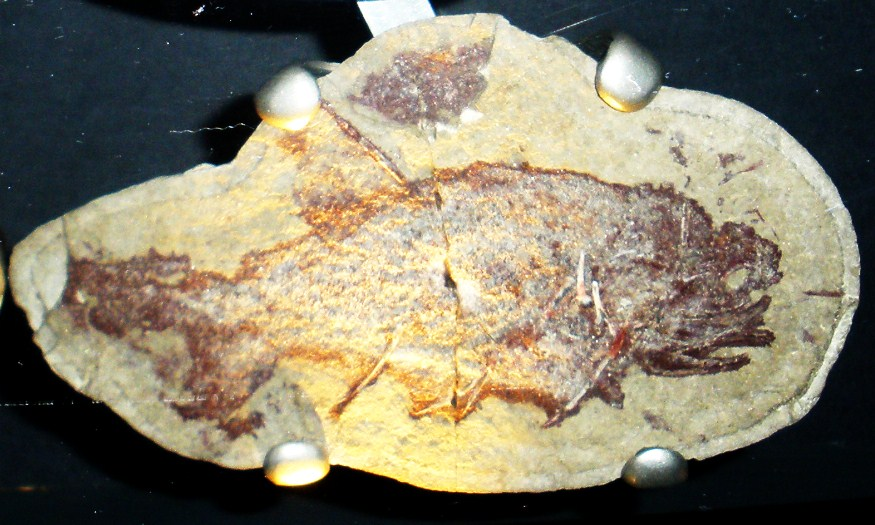
- Fossil of Cheiracanthus latus at the London Natural History Museum

Scientific classification
- Domain: Eukaryota
- Kingdom: Animalia
- Phylum: Chordata
- Class: †Acanthodii
- Order: †Acanthodiformes
- Family: †Cheiracanthidae
- Genus: †Cheiracanthus; Agassiz, 1835

Type species
- † Cheiracanthus murchisoni

= Cheiracanthus =

Cheiracanthus Temporal range: Middle Devonian

Extinct genus of cartilaginous fishes

Cheiracanthus (from Greek: χείρ kheír, 'hand' and Greek: ἄκανθα akantha, 'spine') is an extinct genus of a group of fish called Acanthodii (or "spiny sharks"). It was a deep-bodied acanthodian about 12 in. (30 cm) in length. It had a blunt head, upturned tail, and fins protected by spines. Unlike many other acanthodians, it had one, solitary dorsal fin. Cheiracanthus swam at mid-depth in lakes and rivers, seizing small prey in its gaping jaws. Whole fossils of this fish occur only in Mid-Devonian rocks in Scotland, but its distinctive small, ornamented scales crop up around the world, as far south as Antarctica.

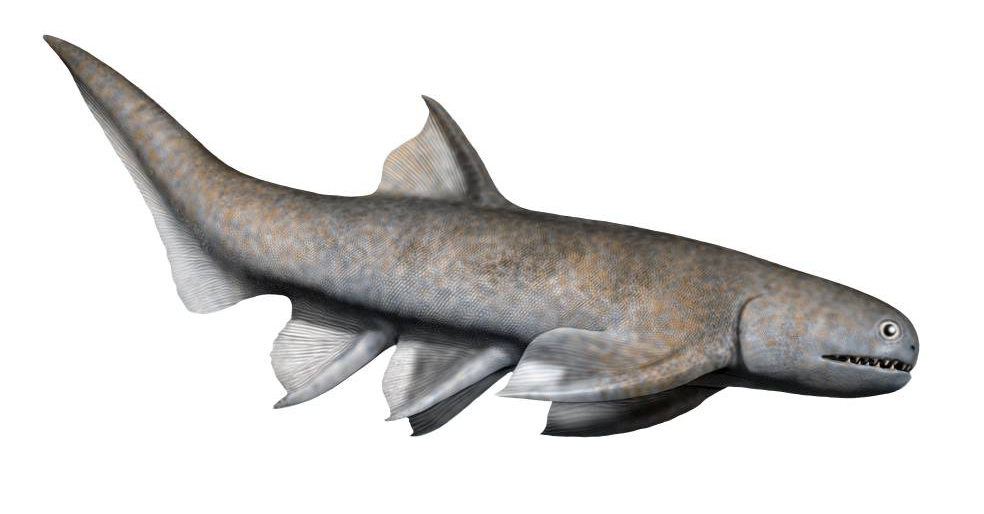
Life restoration of Cheiracanthus murchisoni

== See also ==
- List of acanthodians
