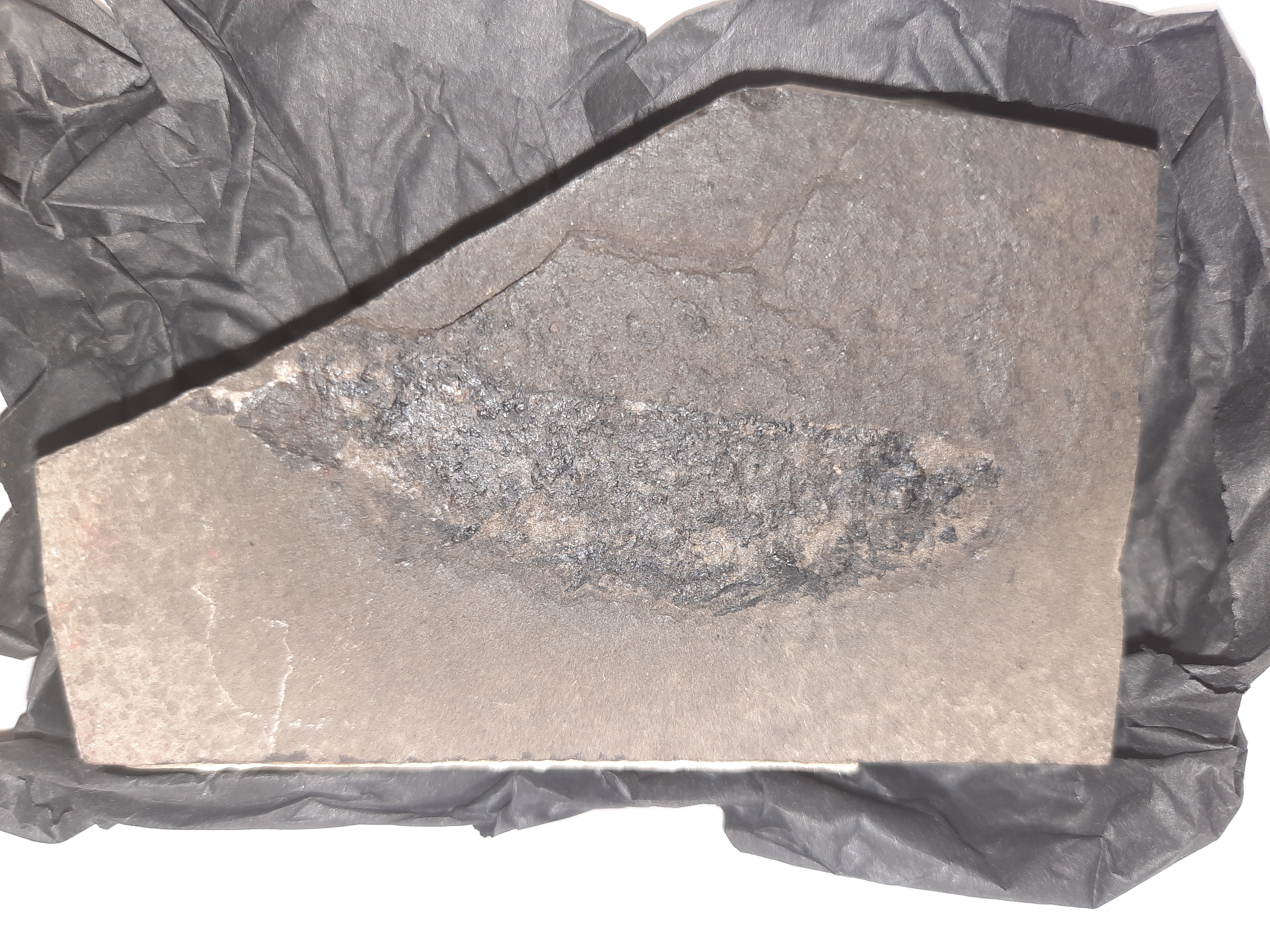
- Mesacanthus peachi fossil

Scientific classification
- Kingdom: Animalia
- Phylum: Chordata
- Class: Chondrichthyes
- Subclass: †Acanthodii
- Order: †Acanthodiformes
- Family: †Mesacanthidae; Moy-Thomas, 1939

= Mesacanthidae =

Extinct family of fish

Mesacanthidae is a family of fish that existed during the Devonian in Northwestern Europe. It is part of the order Acanthodiformes, and includes the genera of Mesacanthus, Lodeacanthus, Melanacanthus, Teneracanthus, and Promesacanthus.
