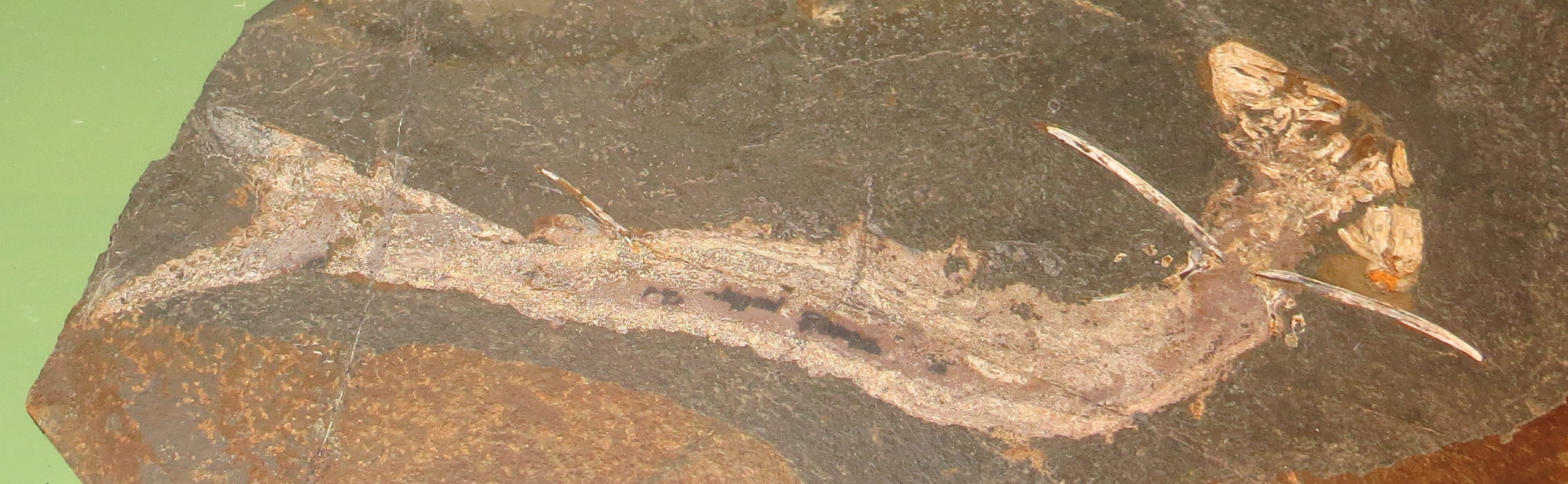
- Fossil of Acanthodes, a member of the family Acanthodidae
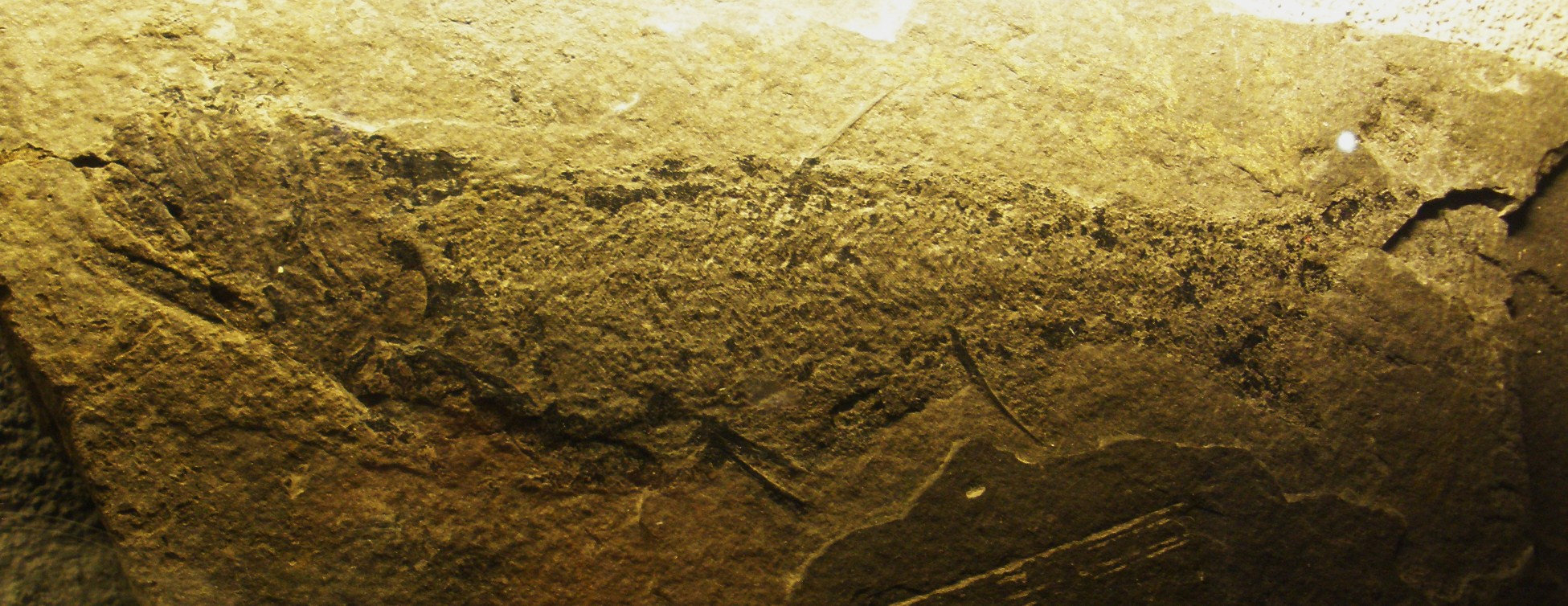
- Fossil of Cheiracanthus, a member of the family Cheiracanthidae

Scientific classification
- Kingdom: Animalia
- Phylum: Chordata
- Class: Chondrichthyes
- Subclass: †Acanthodii
- Order: †Acanthodiformes; Berg, 1940

Families
- Acanthodidae; Cheiracanthidae; Mesacanthidae; Howittacanthidae?

= Acanthodiformes =

Acanthodiformes Temporal range: Early Devonian–Early Permian

Extinct order of fishes

Acanthodiformes (alternatively spelled Acanthodida) is an order of "acanthodians" which lived from the Early Devonian to the Early Permian. Members of the order have been found worldwide in rocks preserving both freshwater and marine environments, and are distinguished from other acanthodians by the presence of only a single dorsal fin and dorsal fin spine, and in most members a lack of teeth and well-developed gill rakers. Some acanthodiforms are presumed to have fed by filter-feeding, and had large mouths and gill arches. While they have been suggested to be close relatives of modern bony fish due to similarities in their skulls, recent research indicates that, like other acanthodians, they are more likely to be stem-group cartilaginous fish.

== Classification ==
The order was first established by Soviet ichthyologist Leo S. Berg in 1940, and contained only the family Acanthodidae. Later authors considered the order to also include the families Mesacanthidae and Cheiracanthidae, and sometimes opted for the alternate spelling "Acanthodida". In 1979, Robert Denison considered the Mesacanthidae and Cheiracanthidae to be evolutionary grades, and considered them part of the family Acanthodidae. This classification scheme again limited the order to a single family, but Denison suggested further families could be established if the evolution of the group were better understood. In a 1995 paper, paleontologist Jaroslav Zajic suggested the family Howittacanthidae should also be included within the order because of similarities between the genus Howittacanthus and members of Acanthodidae. As defined by the Fifth Edition of Fishes of the World (2016), the order includes the distinct families Acanthodidae, Mesacanthidae and Cheiracanthidae. The family Howittacanthidae is not recognized here, and Howittacanthus is considered a member of Acanthodidae under this classification scheme. Below is a comprehensive list of acanthodiform genera, compiled from the Paleobiology Database, Handbook of Paleoichthyology volume 5 (1979), and organized in accordance with Fishes of the World (2016).

- Family Acanthodidae
  - Genus Acanthodes
  - Genus Acanthodopsis
  - Genus Traquairichthys
  - Genus Utahacanthus
  - Genus Triazeugacanthus
  - Genus Westrichus
  - Genus Halimacanthodes (Sometimes placed in Howittacanthidae)
  - Genus Howittacanthus (Sometimes placed in Howittacanthidae)
- Family Cheiracanthidae
  - Genus Cheiracanthus
  - Genus Fallodentus
  - Genus Ginkgolepis
  - Genus Haplacanthus
  - Genus Homalacanthus
  - Genus Markacanthus
- Family Mesacanthidae
  - Genus Lodeacanthus
  - Genus Melanoacanthus
  - Genus Mesacanthus
  - Genus Promesacanthus
  - Genus Teneracanthus
  - Genus Triazeugacanthus

== Description ==
Life reconstruction of Acanthodes lopatini

As defined by Leo Berg, the family and order encompass the acanthodians with a single dorsal fin, no additional fins or spines on the underbelly between the pectoral and pelvic fins (termed intermediate fins or prepelvic spines), pectoral regions that lack dermal bones, a single operculum that covers the gills, and that lacked teeth. Members of the family Mesacanthidae, which are now also included in the order, possessed a single pair of intermediate fins and multiple gill covers and are assumed to be primitive members of the group. The genus Acanthodopsis uniquely possessed tooth-like structures in its jaws, which seem to have developed independently of typical acanthodian teeth. In members of Acanthodidae, scales are restricted to the lateral line and head in some taxa, while the rest of the body is scaleless. The cheiracanthids retained a scaly covering over their entire bodies. The skull is entirely cartilaginous in mesacanthids, while in cheiracanthids and acanthodids the skull is reinforced by a coating of bone (termed perichondral bone). In later, more specialized acanthodids, the gill rakers have become heavily modified, and their otoliths were well-developed. Some members have been characterized as very slender and elongated, with proportionally long bodies relative to the size of the head.

== Research history ==
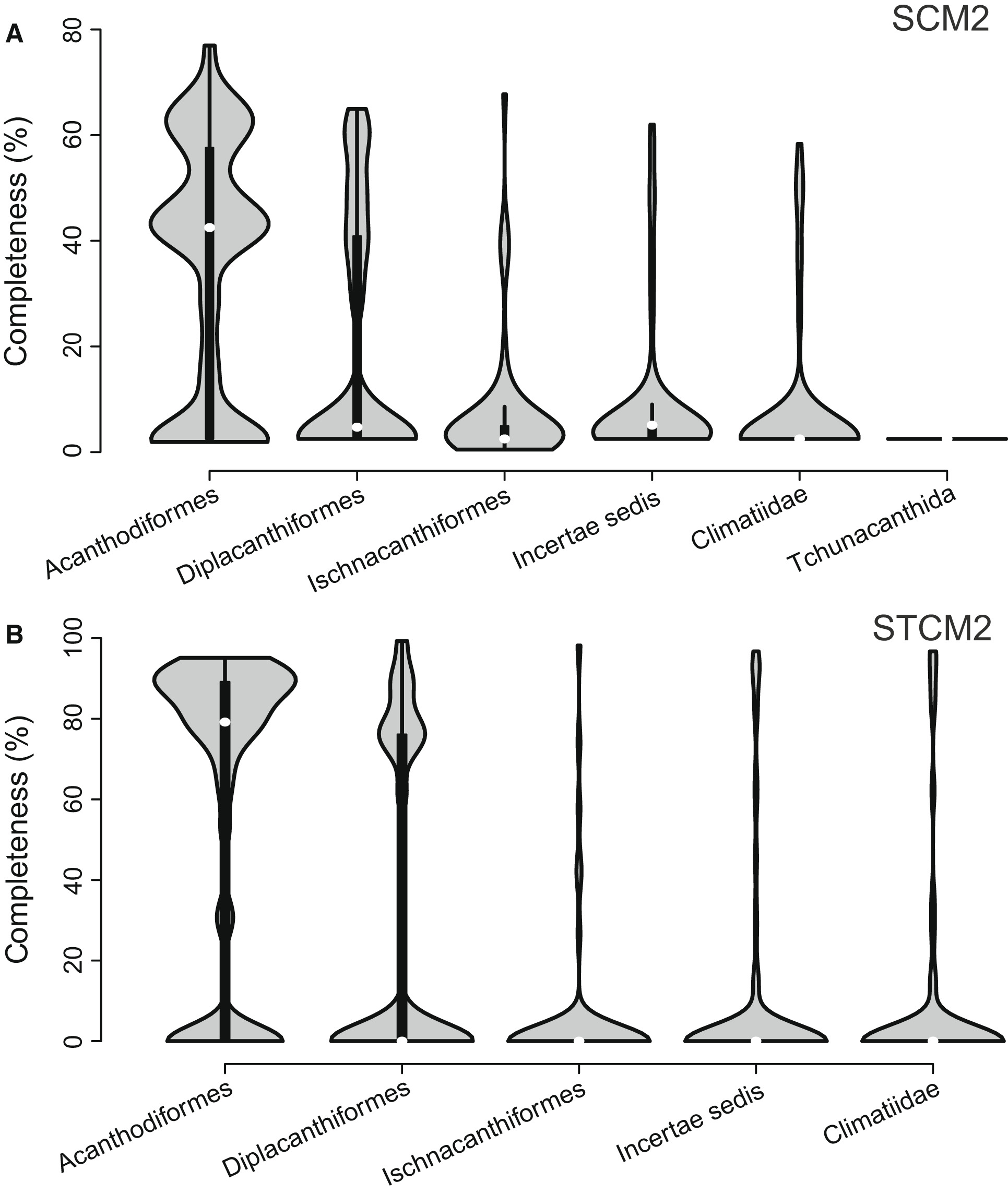
Diagram showcasing the skeletal (A) and soft-tissue (B) completeness of various groups of acanthodians, including the Acanthodiformes

Acanthodiformes has a significantly more complete fossil record than any other group of acanthodians, and a much greater percentage of acanthodiform fossils preserve complete skeletons or soft tissue compared to other acanthodian orders. In particular, species of the genus Acanthodes historically represented the only acanthodian for which uncrushed, well-preserved skeletal anatomy was known, and formed the primarily basis for the study of acanthodian endoskeletons. Due to similarities between the skull of Acanthodes bronni and early members of Osteoichthyes (bony fish) it was often concluded that the acanthodians as a group were related to the osteichthyans within the clade Teleostomi. However, recent research indicates that the class Acanthodii is instead a stem-group that was ancestral to Chondrichthyes (cartilaginous fish), and that similarities between the skulls of Acanthodes and bony fish resulted from convergent evolution and had skewed the perception of acanthodians as a group.

== Paleobiology and extinction ==
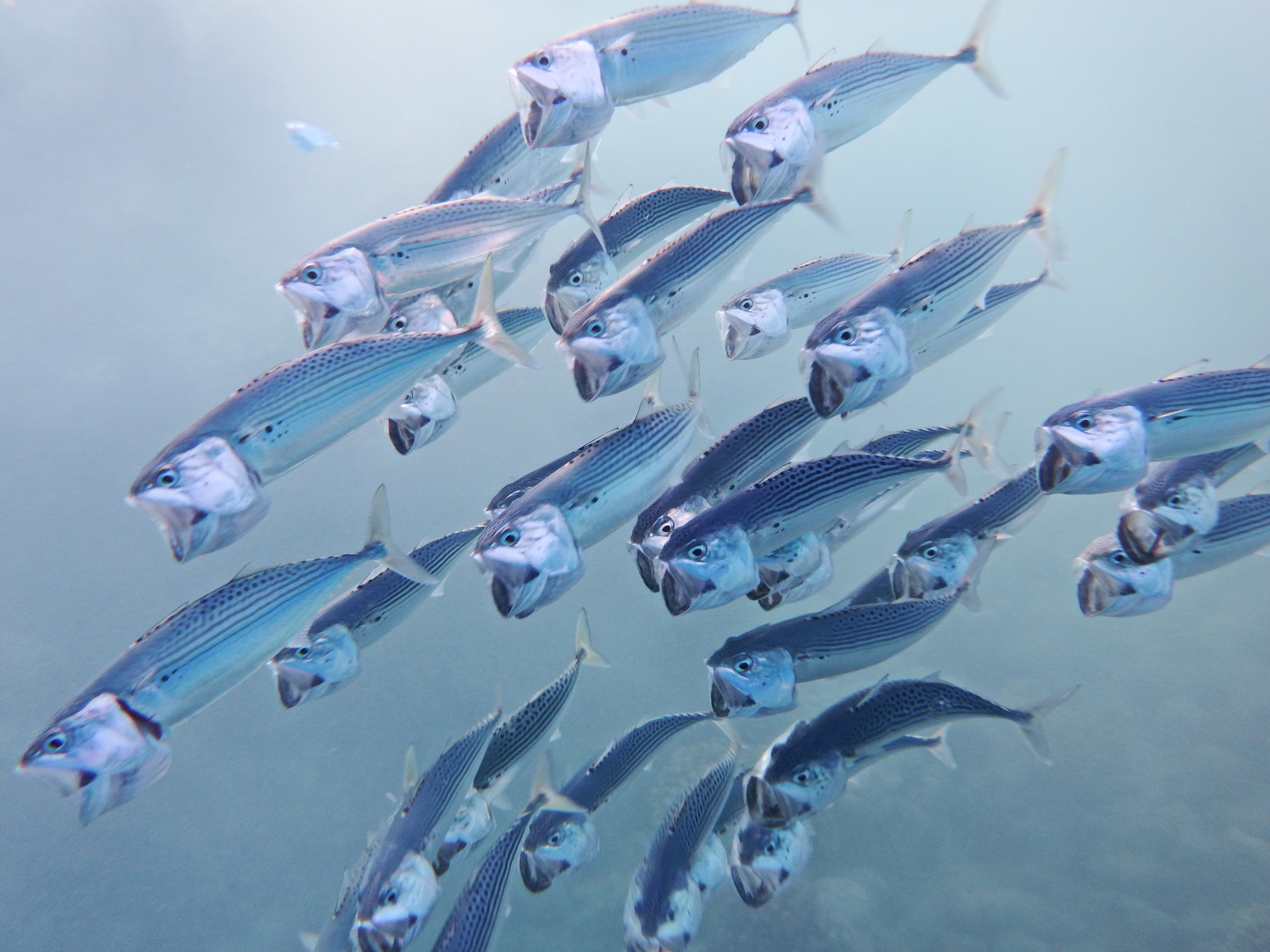
Members of Acanthodiformes fed similarly to bony fish such as Indian mackerel (pictured), and appeared similar to them due to convergent evolution

Members of the Acanthodiformes show adaptations for filter-feeding, such as large, wide mouths and many gill rakers modified for straining small prey from the water. Members of the order are known from both freshwater and marine habitats, although the Late Carboniferous and Early Permian freshwater species are the best represented in the fossil record. The diet of most acanthodiforms likely consisted of small crustaceans and other zooplankton, but Acanthodopsis may have been a macropredator based on its large tooth-like structures. The slender bodies and flexible pectoral regions suggest that members of the group were fast, agile swimmers, and their well-developed otoliths (inner ear) were most likely adaptations for a good sense of balance.

The Acanthodiformes first appeared during the Early Devonian, and members of the family Acanthodidae survived into the Early Permian of Europe and North America. Scales and fin spines similar to those of mesacanthids and acanthodids are known from the later Middle Permian of South America, although these are not assigned to a specific order. The acanthodiforms have been characterized as extremely resilient because the order lasted for over 100 million years, includes some of the last known acanthodians, and is known from fossil deposits worldwide. The extinction of the last members of the order coincided with a diversification of chondrichthyans and actinopteryigians, which may have outcompeted them.
