= Acanthodes =

Acanthodes Temporal range: 359–284 Ma Early Carboniferous to Early Permian
- Life Restoration of Acanthodes lopatini

Scientific classification
- Kingdom: Animalia
- Phylum: Chordata
- Class: Chondrichthyes
- Subclass: †Acanthodii
- Order: †Acanthodiformes
- Family: †Acanthodidae
- Genus: †Acanthodes; Agassiz, 1833

Type species
- Acanthodes bronni Agassiz, 1833

Species
- See text

Genus of cartilaginous fishes

Acanthodes (from Greek: ἄκανθώδης akanthódis, 'provided with spines') is an extinct genus of acanthodian fish. Species have been found in Europe, North America, and Asia, spanning the Early Carboniferous to the Early Permian, making it one of the youngest known acanthodian genera.

== Description ==
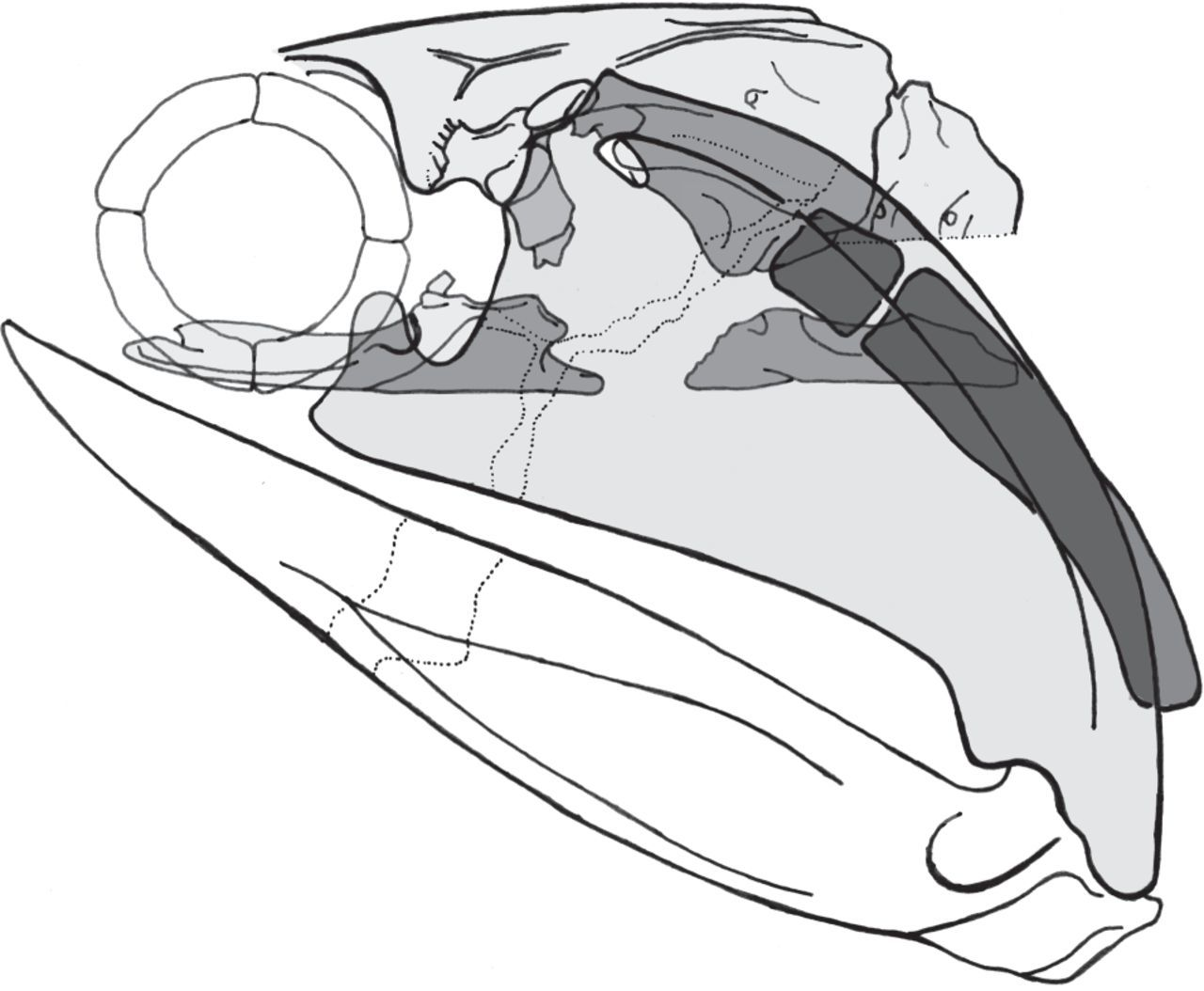
Skull reconstruction of A. bronni

The largest species of Acanthodes like Acanthodes confusus and Acanthodes splendidus grew to lengths of at least 80 centimetres (31 in), while some species like Acanthodes ultimus were much smaller, reaching a total body length of only 15 centimetres (5.9 in). The body was elongate and had a pair of pectoral fins, an unpaired dorsal fin far back on the body, with an unpaired long ventral/pelvic fin and an anal fin on the underside of the body, which like other acanthodians were supported by stiff spines at their front edges. The whole body was covered in scales, which varied in shape depending on their position. The vertebral column was typically unossified. Species of Acanthodes differ from each other in the degree of body elongation and the size and shape of the fins. Acanthodes had no teeth and had long gill rakers. Because of this, Acanthodes is presumed to have been a suspension feeder, filtering plankton from the water. A specimen of Acanthodes bridgei was so well-preserved that traces of its eye tissue were sufficient to establish that Acanthodes had both rod and cone photoreceptor cells, suggesting that it was capable of color vision.

== Ecology ==
The various species of Acanthodes are known to have inhabited freshwater lakes, as well as saline lagoons. Acanthodes bronni, which lived in freshwater lakes in southern Germany during the Early Permian, is known to have been fed upon by the temnospondyl amphibians Archegosaurus and Glanochthon. Acanthodes was likely capable of opening its jaws wide as an adaptation to suspension feeding, with the jaws possibly also rotating outwards during opening in order to increase gape.

== Taxonomy ==
The classification of acanthodians was historically contentious, however, in the 2010s based in part based on detailed studies of the skull of Acanthodes, it became widely accepted that acanthodians represented a paraphyletic assemblage of stem-group Chondrichthyes. Within the "Acanthodii", Acanthodes is traditionally placed within the Acanthodiformes, which is now also considered to be paraphyletic.

=== Species ===
After Beznosov, 2009 and Heidtke, 2011

- Acanthodes bronni Agassiz, 1833 (type), Meisenheim Formation, Germany, Lower Permian, 35 centimetres (14 in)
- Acanthodes bourbonensis Heidtke, 1996, Early Permian, France, 20 centimetres (7.9 in)
- Acanthodes boyi Heidtke, 1993, Meisenheim Formation, Early Permian, Germany, 44 centimetres (17 in)
- Acanthodes bridgei Zidek, 1976, Hamilton Quarry, Late Carboniferous (Stephanian), Kansas, USA, 41 centimetres (16 in)
- Acanthodes confusus Heidtke, 2011, Meisenheim Formation, Early Permian, Germany, 75 centimetres (30 in)
- Acanthodes fritschi Zajic, 1998, Late Carboniferous (Stephanian), Czech Republic, 35 centimetres (14 in)
- Acanthodes gracilis (Beyrich, 1848), Early Permian, Czech Republic, Poland and Germany, 40 centimetres (16 in)
- Acanthodes kinneyi Zidek, 1992, Atrasado Formation, Late Carboniferous (Stephanian), New Mexico, USA, 35 centimetres (14 in)
- Acanthodes lopatini Rohon, 1889, Early Carboniferous (Tournaisian), southern Krasnoyarsk Krai, Russia, 12 centimetres (4.7 in)
- Acanthodes lundi Zidek, 1980, Bear Gulch Limestone, Early Carboniferous (Namurian), Montana, USA, 44 centimetres (17 in)
- Acanthodes ovensi White, 1927, Early Carboniferous (Tournaisian), Scotland, 40 centimetres (16 in) although normally up to 9 centimetres (3.5 in)
- Acanthodes palatinensis Heidtke, 2011, Meisenheim Formation, Early Permian, Germany, 35 centimetres (14 in)
- Acanthodes pollichiae Heidtke, 2011, Meisenheim Formation, Early Permian, Germany, 25 centimetres (9.8 in)
- Acanthodes relsbergensis Heidtke, 2011, Meisenheim Formation, Early Permian, Germany, 50 centimetres (20 in)
- Acanthodes ruhinensis Heidtke, 2011, Meisenheim Formation, Early Permian, Germany, 40 centimetres (16 in)
- Acanthodes sippeli Heidtke, 1996, Late Carboniferous (Namurian), Germany, 42 centimetres (17 in)
- Acanthodes splendidus Heidtke, 2011, Meisenheim Formation, Early Permian, Germany, 80 centimetres (31 in)
- Acanthodes stambergi Zajic, 2005, Early Permian, Czech Republic, 25 centimetres (9.8 in)
- Acanthodes ultimus Heidtke, 2011, Donnersberg Formation, Early Permian, Germany, 15 centimetres (5.9 in)
- Acanthodes wardi Egerton, 1866, Late Carboniferous (Westphalian), England and Scotland, 25–75 centimetres (9.8–29.5 in)

==== Indeterminate or dubious species ====
- Acanthodes australis Woodward, 1906, Mansfield Basin, Australia, Early Carboniferous, 30 centimetres (12 in)
- Acanthodes beecheri Eastman 1902, Mazon Creek, Illinois, USA, Late Carboniferous, 5.5 centimetres (2.2 in), listed in Schnetz (2022)
- Acanthodes guizhouensis Wang Shitao & Turner 1984, Early Carboniferous (Tournaisian), Guizhou, China
- Acanthodes latgalica Lyarskaya & Luksevic 1992, Early Devonian (Emsian), Baltic
- Acanthodes luedersensis (Dalquest et al., 1988), Early Permian, Texas, USA
- Acanthodes nitidus Woodward 1891, Early Carboniferous (Visean), Scotland, listed in Schnetz (2022)
- Acanthodes punetatus Fritsch 1893, Early Permian, Czech Republic
- Acantodes sulcatus Agassiz, 1835, Early Carboniferous (Visean), Scotland, 25 centimetres (9.8 in), listed in Schnetz (2022)

Acanthodes tholeyi Heidtke, 1990 from Early Permian, Germany is now assigned to genus Westrichus.
