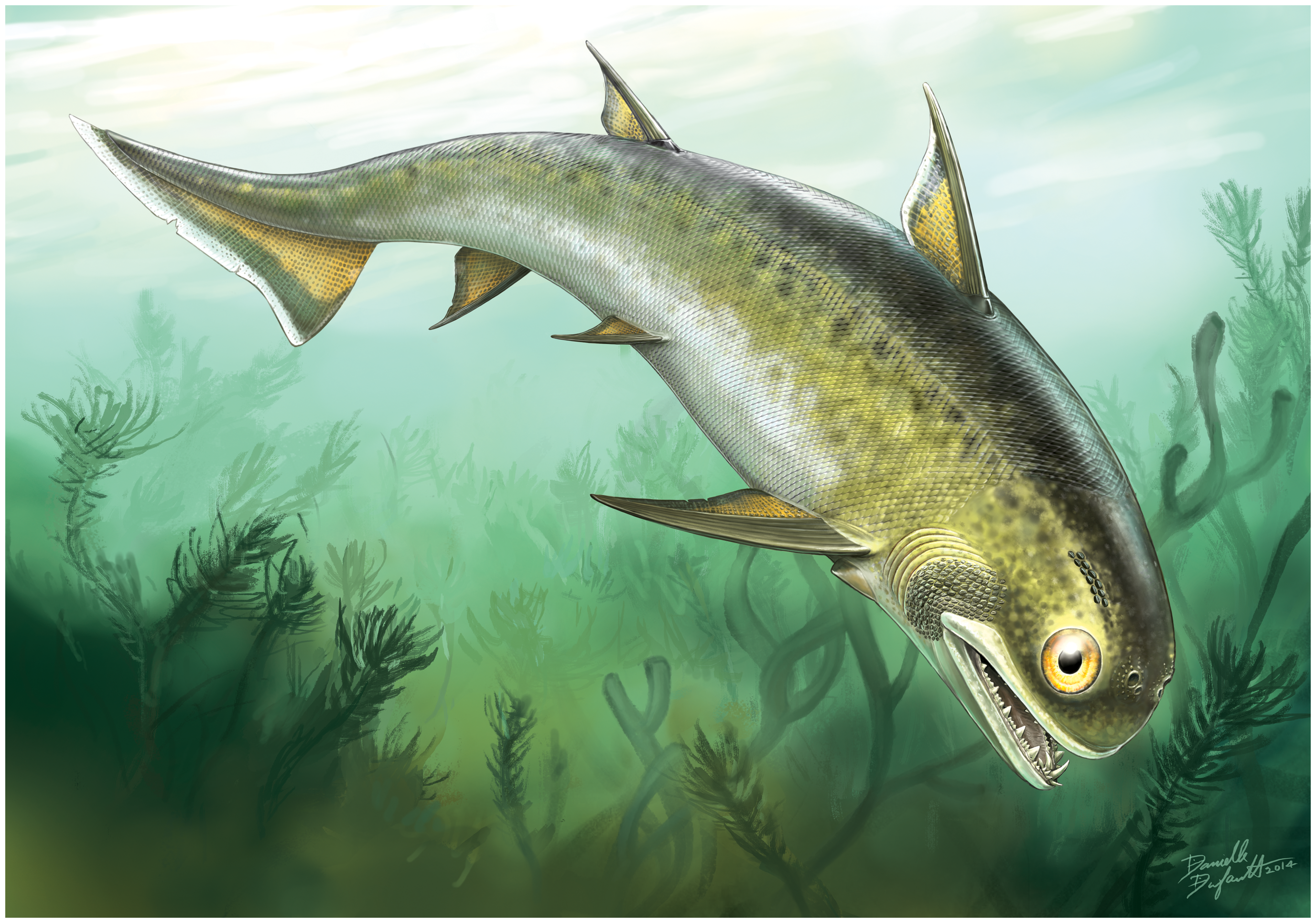
- Nerepisacanthus

Scientific classification
- Kingdom: Animalia
- Phylum: Chordata
- Class: Chondrichthyes
- Subclass: †Acanthodii
- Order: †Ischnacanthiformes

Subdivisions
- Ischnacanthidae; Poracanthidae; Xylacanthus

= Ischnacanthiformes =

Ischnacanthiformes Temporal range: 418–409 Ma

Extinct order of cartilaginous fishes

Ischnacanthiformes is a prehistoric order of "acanthodian" stem-chondrichthyans found in Canada, Ukraine and United Kingdom. Members of this order were nektonic carnivores, eating animals that swim rather than plankton. They had slender builds, light armor, deeply inserted spines, shark-like teeth, and two dorsal fins. Some species were around 2 meters (6.56 feet) long. It was described by Berg in 1940.
