= 2025 in paleoichthyology =

Several new fossil taxa of jawless vertebrates, placoderms, cartilaginous fishes, bony fishes, and other fishes were described during the year 2025, which also saw other significant discoveries and events related to paleoichthyology.

== Jawless vertebrates ==
Name	Novelty	Status	Authors	Age	Type locality	Location	Notes	Images
Deanaspis	Gen. et sp. nov	Junior homonym	Lin et al.	Silurian	Xikeng Formation	China	A member of Galeaspida. Genus includes new species D. longpingi. The generic name is preoccupied by Deanaspis Hughes, Ingham & Addison (1975).	
Neoturinia rossensis	Sp. nov		Burrow & Turner	Devonian	Parke Siltstone	Australia	A thelodont.	

=== Jawless vertebrate research ===
- Märss (2025) revises jawless vertebrates from the Silurian (Wenlock) to Devonian (Lochkovian) strata of the Ufa Amphitheatre (Russia), and names a new family Tahulaspididae within Osteostraci.
- Sanchez-Sanchez, Sanisidro & Ferrón (2025) study the hydrodynamic performance of headshield processes of members of Pteraspidomorphi, reporting evidence of repeated, independent evolution of frontal, dorsal and lateral processes in response to functional demands.
- A study on the phylogenetic relationships of members of Heterostraci is published by Randle, Keating & Sansom (2025).
- Schnetz et al. (2025) reconstruct the whole-body morphology of Anglaspis heintzi, and interpret its oral apparatus as indicative of adaptation to suspension feeding.
- Gai et al. (2025) review the fossil record of galeaspids from China and Vietnam.
- Miyashita et al. (2025) provide new information on the anatomy of the head–trunk interface in Norselaspis glacialis, reporting evidence of presence of features previously known only in jawed vertebrates, and interpret their findings and indicative of evolution of sensory elaborations and increase of cardiac output and locomotory control in vertebrates before the appearance of the vertebrate jaw.

== Placoderms ==
Name	Novelty	Status	Authors	Age	Type locality	Location	Notes	Images
Albarutheniaspis	Gen. et sp. nov		Newman & Plax	Devonian (Famennian)		Belarus	A member of the family Groenlandaspididae. The type species is A. bessonovae.	
Bothriolepis zhujiangyuanensis	Sp. nov	Valid	Xian et al.	Devonian (Eifelian)	Shangshuanghe Formation	China		
Elmosteus	Gen. et comb. nov	Valid	Jobbins et al.	Devonian	Elm Point Formation	Canada (Manitoba)	A basal dunkleosteid placoderm; a new genus for "Eastmanosteus" lundarensis Hanke, Stewart & Lammers (1996).	
Microbrachius longi	Sp. nov	Valid	Mark-Kurik et al.	Devonian (Givetian)	Burtnieki Formation	Estonia		
Romundina gagnieri	Sp. nov		Olive et al.	Devonian (Lochkovian)	Drake Bay Formation	Canada (Nunavut)		
Tongdulepis	Gen. et sp. nov	Valid	Luo, Pan & Zhu	Devonian (Eifelian)	Qujing Formation	China	A member of Bothriolepidoidei belonging to the family Tubalepididae. The type species is T. concavus.	

=== Placoderm research ===
- Babcock (2025) designates the neotype for Macropetalichthys rapheidolabis and the lectotype for Agassichthys manni, redescribes the lectotype of Agassichthys sullivanti, and interprets A. manni, A. sullivanti and Pterichthys norwoodensis as junior synonyms of M. rapheidolabis.
- Pears et al. (2025) reconstruct the appendicular skeleton and musculature of arthrodires from the Devonian Gogo Formation (Australia), providing evidence of anatomical similarity of fins and musculature of the studied specimens.
- Redescription and a study on the affinities of Exutaspis megista is published by Xue et al. (2025).
- Trinajstic et al. (2025) describe new fossil material of Bullerichthys fascidens from the Devonian Gogo Formation (Australia), providing new information on the morphology of the headshield in the studied species, as well as evidence resorption and remodelling of teeth similar to those seen in bony fishes.
- Engelman et al. (2025) present a new reconstruction of parts of skeleton and musculature of Dunkleosteus terrelli involved in feeding.

== Cartilaginous fishes ==
Name	Novelty	Status	Authors	Age	Type locality	Location	Notes	Images
Altacollum	Gen. et sp. nov	Valid	Newman & Plax	Devonian (Famennian)	Starobin Beds	Belarus; Greenland	An acanthodian. The type species is A. valiukeviciusi.	
Angelacanthus	Gen. et comb. nov	Valid	Gess & Burrow	Devonian (Famennian)	Waterloo Farm lagerstätte	South Africa	A diplacanthid acanthodian. The type species is "Diplacanthus" acus Gess (2001).	
Antrigoulia guinoti	Sp. nov	Valid	Duffin & Batchelor	Early Cretaceous	Lower Greensand Group	United Kingdom		
Apolithabatis	Gen. et sp. nov		Türtscher et al.	Late Jurassic (Kimmeridgian)	Painten Formation	Germany	A ray in the new clade Apolithabatiformes. The type species is A. seioma.	
Archaeogracilidens	Gen. et comb. nov	Valid	Villalobos-Segura et al.	Late Jurassic (Kimmeridgian)		Germany	A member of Hexanchiformes belonging to the family Orthacodidae. The type species is "Oxyrhina" macer Quenstedt (1851).	
Archaeoscyllium	Gen. et comb. nov	Valid	Begat et al.	Middle Jurassic (Callovian)		United Kingdom	A member of Orectolobiformes. The type species is "Protospinax" muftius Thies (1982).	
Batillodus	Gen. et sp. nov	Valid	Duffin, Lauer & Lauer	Carboniferous (Kasimovian)	Kansas City Group	United States (Kansas)	A member of Petalodontiformes belonging to the family Janassidae. The type species is B. beaveri.	
Callorhinchus orientalis	Sp. nov	Valid	Ota et al.	Late Cretaceous (Maastrichtian)	Hakobuchi Formation	Japan	A species of Callorhinchus.	
Centrodeania perchensis	Sp. nov		Feichtinger et al.	Late Cretaceous		Germany	A member of the family Centrophoridae.	
Chiloscyllium serralheiroi	Sp. nov	Valid	Landau, Hovestadt & Silva	Miocene (Tortonian)	Cacela Formation	Portugal	A species of Chiloscyllium.	
Clavusodens	Gen. et sp. nov	Valid	Hodnett et al.	Carboniferous (Viséan)	Ste. Genevieve Formation	United States (Kentucky)	A member of Petalodontiformes belonging to the family Obruchevodidae. The type species is C. mcginnisi.	
Coquandon	Nom. nov	Valid	Greenfield	Late Cretaceous (Coniacian)		France	A probable member of Galeomorphii; a replacement name for Orthodon Coquand (1859).	
Cynopodius robustus	Sp. nov	Valid	Burrow et al.	Carboniferous (Viséan)	Ste. Genevieve Formation	United States (Iowa)		
Dasyatis manuelcamposi	Sp. nov	Valid	Villafaña et al.	Miocene	Bahía Inglesa Formation	Chile	A species of Dasyatis.	
Distobatus potiguarense	Sp. nov		Brito et al.	Cretaceous	Açu Formation	Brazil	A member of Hybodontiformes belonging to the family Distobatidae.	
Dorsetoscyllium belbekensis	Sp. nov		Trikolidi	Early Cretaceous (Berriasian)		Crimea	A carpet shark. Published online in 2025, but the issue date is listed as December 2024.	
Echinorhinus taverai	Sp. nov		Otero et al.	Late Cretaceous (Maastrichtian)		Chile	A species of Echinorhinus.	
Eorapax	Gen. et sp. nov	Valid	Saugen et al.	Early Triassic	Vikinghøgda Formation	Norway	A neoselachian. The type species is E. serrasis.	
Galeocerdo platycuspidatum	Sp. nov	Valid	Cicimurri et al.	Oligocene	Catahoula Formation	United States (Mississippi)	A species of Galeocerdo.	
Heckelodes	Nom. nov	Valid	Greenfield	Oligocene		Italy	A probable member of Galeomorphii; a replacement name for Galeodes Heckel (1854).	
Hemipristis intermedia	Sp. nov	Valid	Cicimurri et al.	Oligocene	Catahoula Formation	United States (Mississippi)	A species of Hemipristis.	
Hypanus? heterodontus	Sp. nov	Valid	Cicimurri et al.	Oligocene	Catahoula Formation	United States (Mississippi)	A whiptail stingray.	
Jurascyllium	Gen. et comb. nov	Valid	Begat et al.	Jurassic (Bathonian to Kimmeridgian)		Germany; United Kingdom	A member of Orectolobiformes. The type species is "Protospinax" magnus Underwood & Ward (2004).	
Lethenia carranzaensis	Sp. nov	Valid	Otero	Eocene-Oligocene	Millongue Formation	Chile		
Lonchidion conrugis	Sp. nov		Wick & Lehman	Late Cretaceous (Campanian)	Aguja Formation	United States (Texas)		
Macadens	Gen. et sp. nov	Valid	Hodnett et al.	Carboniferous (Viséan)	Ste. Genevieve Formation	United States (Kentucky)	A member of Euchondrocephali of uncertain affinities. The type species is M. olsoni.	
Modicucollum	Gen. et sp. nov	Valid	Newman & Plax	Devonian (Famennian)	Velizhie Beds	Belarus	An acanthodian. The type species is M. golubtsovi.	
Ndhalalepis	Gen. et sp. nov		Burrow & Turner	Devonian	Parke Siltstone	Australia	An acanthodian. The type species is N. youngi.	
Palaeocentroscymnus bavaricus	Sp. nov		Feichtinger et al.	Late Cretaceous		Germany	A member of the family Somniosidae.	
Palaeorhincodon fialhoi	Sp. nov	Valid	Landau, Hovestadt & Silva	Miocene (Tortonian)	Cacela Formation	Portugal		
Paralopias	Gen. et sp. nov	Valid	Canevet	Miocene (Serravallian)		France	A thresher shark. Genus includes new species P. follioti.	
Pararhincodon torquis	Sp. nov	Valid	Dearden et al.	Late Cretaceous	Chalk Group	United Kingdom	A carpet shark belonging to the stem group of the family Parascylliidae.	
Pochitaserra	Gen. et sp. nov	Valid	Villafaña et al.	Miocene	Bahía Inglesa Formation	Chile	A sawshark. The type species is P. patriciacanalae. Named after the character Pochita from the manga/anime Chainsaw Man.	
Pseudocorax heteroserratus	Sp. nov	Valid	Egli et al.	Late Cretaceous (Maastrichtian)	Oulad Abdoun Basin	Morocco		
Pseudorhina carinata	Sp. nov	Valid	Duffin & Batchelor	Early Cretaceous	Lower Greensand Group	United Kingdom		
Pseudorhina clopellensis	Sp. nov	Valid	Duffin & Batchelor	Early Cretaceous	Lower Greensand Group	United Kingdom		
Pseudorhina magnapraecinctorium	Sp. nov	Valid	Duffin & Batchelor	Early Cretaceous	Lower Greensand Group	United Kingdom		
Restesia corricki	Sp. nov		Wick & Lehman	Late Cretaceous (Campanian)	Aguja Formation	United States (Texas)		
Rotuladens	Gen. et comb. nov	Valid	Hodnett et al.	Carboniferous (Tournaisian-Viséan)	Keokuk Limestone	United States (Iowa)	A member of Euchondrocephali of uncertain affinities. The type species is "Helodus" coxanus Newberry (1897).	
Scapanorhynchus patagonensis	Sp. nov	Valid	Begat et al.	Late Cretaceous (Cenomanian)		Argentina		
Serpensiugum	Gen. et sp. nov	Valid	Newman & Plax	Devonian (Famennian)	Starobin Beds	Belarus	An acanthodian. The type species is S. pushkini.	
"Sphyrna" gracile	Sp. nov	Valid	Cicimurri et al.	Oligocene	Catahoula Formation	United States (Mississippi)	A hammerhead shark.	
"Sphyrna" robustum	Sp. nov	Valid	Cicimurri et al.	Oligocene	Catahoula Formation	United States (Mississippi)	A hammerhead shark.	
Strophodus timoluebkei	Sp. nov	Valid	Carrillo-Briceño et al.	Late Jurassic	Sulzfluh Limestone Formation	Switzerland		
cf. Synechodus rotheliusi	Sp. nov	Valid	Saugen et al.	Early Triassic	Vikinghøgda Formation	Norway		
Verrucasquama	Gen. et sp. nov	Valid	Newman & Plax	Devonian (Famennian)	Starobin Beds	Belarus	An acanthodian. The type species is V. antipenkoi.	
Wimanodon	Gen. et sp. nov	Valid	Saugen et al.	Early Triassic	Vikinghøgda Formation	Norway	A neoselachian. The type species is W. marmieri.	
Xiphodolamia maliki	Sp. nov	Valid	Artüz & Sakınç	Eocene (Lutetian)	Soğucak Formation	Turkey		

=== Cartilaginous fish research ===
- Griffin et al. (2025) study the morphological diversity of jaws of cartilaginous fishes throughout their evolutionary history, providing evidence of a shift from morphologies optimized for strength and speed toward more robust ones.
- Evidence from the study of teeth of Ctenacanthus concinnus, Phoebodus saidselachus and Maghriboselache mohamezanei, indicative of high diversity of histology and mineralisation patterns early in the evolution of cartilaginous fishes, is presented by Greif et al. (2025).
- A study on the development of the dermal skeleton of Fanjingshania renovata is published by Andreev et al. (2025).
- A diverse assemblage of cartilaginous fish fossils, including the youngest record of Phoebodus latus reported to date, is described from the Upper Devovian strata from the South Urals (Russia) by Ivanov et al. (2025).
- A study on the composition of the Permian fish assemblages from the Guadalupe Mountains National Park (Texas, United States), including the youngest records of Bransonella lingulata, Stethacanthulus decorus, Glikmanius myachkovensis and Heslerodus divergens in the world, is published by Ivanov, Hearst & Nestell (2025).
- Li et al. (2025) report the discovery of a new fish assemblage dominated by cartilaginous fishes from the Permian (Changhsingian) Dalong Formation (Sichuan, China), including a probable neoselachian which might represent the earliest record of a cartilaginous fish with holaulacorhize-like root vascularization.
- A study on the development and evolution of tenaculum and its tooth-like denticles in chimaeras, as indicated by their development during ontogeny in extant spotted ratfish and by anatomy of Carboniferous Helodus simplex, is published by Cohen, Coates & Fraser (2025), who interpret the denticles of the tenaculum as more likely to be true teeth than modified dermal denticles.
- Zhao et al. (2025) interpret Laffonia helvetica as a holocephalan egg capsule morphologically intermediate between Carboniferous Crookallia and Vetacapsula and extant chimaerid capsules.
- A well-preserved specimen of Chimaeropsis paradoxa, displaying soft parts, is described from the Tithonian strata in the Solnhofen area (Germany) by Duffin, Lauer & Lauer (2025).
- Duffin & Ward (2025) describe a quasi-complete but poorly preserved specimen of Elasmodectes cf. willetti from the Cenomanian strata in Morocco, and identify the first fossil of a member of the genus Elasmodectes (a tooth plate) from the Albian Gault Clay of Folkestone (Kent, United Kingdom.
- Popov & Rogov (2025) describe chimaeroid fossil material from the Coniacian strata from the Krasnoyarsk Krai (Russia), providing evidence of presence of Edaphodon sp. and Harriotta sp. in the polar latitudes of eastern Siberia during the Late Cretaceous.
- A study on the histology and growth of dental plates of Ischyodus dolloi is published by Cerda, Gouiric Cavalli & Reguero (2025).
- Gayford & Jambura (2025) review evidence of different drivers of diversification of elasmobranchs throughout their evolutionary history.
- The first dermal denticles of Listracanthus hystrix from Ireland are described from the Carboniferous Clare Shale Formation (County Clare, Republic of Ireland) by Doyle (2025).
- Greif et al. (2025) reconstruct feeding habits of Ctenacanthus concinnus, interpreting it as likely opportunistic feeder that used an array of feeding mechanisms.
- Vida, Kriwet & Martin (2025) revise the cartilaginous fish assemblage from the Rhaetian Contorta Beds of Bonenburg (Exter Formation; Germany), interpret Rhomphaiodon minor as a junior synonym of Nemacanthus monilifer, and reconstruct the food web of fishes from Bonenburg, providing evidence of presence of diverse mesopredators and of likely niche partitioning in cartilaginous fishes.
- Eltink et al. (2025) report the first discovery of fossil material of Priohybodus arambourgi from the Upper Jurassic Aliança Formation (Brazil), and study tooth morphology of members of the species and its variation.
- Valentin et al. (2025) describe new fossil material of hybodont sharks from the Campanian strata in France, including the first record of Parvodus from the Late Cretaceous.
- Staggl et al. (2025) study diversity dynamics of neoselachians throughout the Mesozoic, providing evidence that higher atmospheric CO_{2} concentrations had negative effect on neoselachian diversity.
- A study on changes of diversity dynamics of neoselachians throughout the Cenozoic and on drivers of those changes is published by Staggl et al. (2025).
- Kocáková et al. (2025) study the diversification trajectories of neoselachians over the past 145 million years, providing evidence that young species consistently faced higher extinction risk than older ones, and identifying previously undetected extinction events in the evolutionary history of the studied group.
- Evidence from the study of oxygen isotope composition of teeth of Cretoxyrhina mantelli, Cretalamna appendiculata, Scapanorhynchus texanus, Squalicorax kaupi, Squalicorax pristodontus and Ptychodus mortoni from the Upper Cretaceous strata from the Gulf Coastal Plain, interpreted as likely indicative of increased body temperature of P. mortoni and indicative of active heating and migration from warmer waters by C. mantelli, is presented by Comans, Tobin & Totten (2025)
- Benavides-Cabra et al. (2025) describe a new specimen of Protolamna ricaurtei from the Aptian Paja Formation (Colombia), representing the first Early Cretaceous lamniform specimen preserved with both teeth and vertebrae, and providing evidence of large overall body size of this shark, but with proportionally small teeth.
- The first isolated chondrichthyan vertebral centrum from the Aptian Santana Formation (Brazil), identified as belonging to a lamniform shark, is described by Brito et al. (2025).
- Cardabiodontid fossil material, likely belonging to one of the largest lamniform sharks in the fossil record reported to date, is described from the Aptian Darwin Formation (Australia) by Bazzi et al. (2025).
- Amadori et al. (2025) reconstruct the lower crushing plate of Ptychodus decurrens on the basis of new fossil material from the Upper Cretaceous strata in Croatia.
- Goedert et al. (2025) describe new fossil material of members of the genus Otodus from the Crescent, Aldwell, Lincoln Creek, Pysht and Astoria formations (Washington, United States), providing evidence of presence of members of this genus in northeastern Pacific Ocean from at least the early Eocene to the Miocene.
- Shimada et al. (2025) argue that Otodus megalodon likely had slenderer body than the great white shark, and estimate that it might have reached about 24.3 m in body length.
- McCormack et al. (2025) study the trophic ecology of marine vertebrates from the Miocene (Burdigalian) Upper Marine Molasse sediments (Germany), and report evidence indicating that members of the genus Otodus did not feed exclusively on high trophic level prey, as well as evidence indicating that most of the studied specimens of Carcharodon hastalis fed on a lower trophic level prey than extant great white shark.
- Godfrey et al. (2025) describe teeth of Carcharodon hastalis embedded in cetacean vertebrae from the Miocene Calvert Formation (Maryland, United States), confirming that the studied shark fed on marine mammals.
- A study on the evolution of members of Squaliformes is published by Marion, Condamine & Guinot (2025), who find evidence of multiple colonizations of the deep sea that coincided with marine transgressions and were likely facilitated by the evolution of bioluminescence.
- Greenfield (2025) reidentify the large rostrum and four fragmentary rostral denticles from the Dakhla Formation originally attributed to Onchopristis sp. by Capasso et al. (2024) as Sclerorhynchoidei indet. and Sclerorhynchus cf. leptodon, respectively, while Capasso et al. (2025) supported their original identification and stated that any taxonomic determination without direct examination is unacceptable.
- Collareta & Mollen (2025) identify fossil material of Nebriimimus wardi from the Pliocene strata from Guardamar del Segura (Spain), representing the first record of this species outside Italy.
- A study on the evolution of the shark body form is published by Gayford et al. (2025), who interpret their findings as indicating that ancestral shark were living in benthic environments, as well as indicative of four independent cases of transition of sharks to the pelagic zone and related adaptations of their body form, likely linked to increased habitat availability during the Jurassic and Cretaceous.
- Assemat, Adnet & Martin (2025) study the trophic ecology of Maastrichtian elasmobranchs from Morocco, and report evidence of similarities of the studied assemblage with modern trophic food webs, as well as evidence of consumption of tetrapods by Squalicorax pristodontus.
- Cañete-Cañete et al. (2025) revise the fossil record of cartilaginous fishes from Chile from the Late Cretaceous to the Eocene, finding no evidence of a significant turnover during the Cretaceous-Paleogene transition, and finding evidence of increase of diversity during the Eocene.
- Fossil material of diverse Miocene (Aquitanian) shark assemblage is described from the Khari Nadi Formation (Kachchh, India) by Chaskar et al. (2025).
- New elasmobranch fossil material is described from the Miocene strata of the Upper Marine Molasse from the Ursendorf and Rengetsweiler sites (Germany) by Höltke et al. (2025).
- New Miocene shark and ray fossil material, including the first records of Carcharhinus amblyrhynchoides, Carcharhinus brevipinna, Physogaleus hemmooriensis and Aetobatus cappettai from the Miocene of the Indian subcontinent, is described from the Baripada Beds (India) by Singh et al. (2025).
- A new assemblage of deep-marine elasmobranchs, including fossils of representatives of five different orders with a wide range of feeding behaviors, is described from the Miocene (Langhian) strata in Austria by Feichtinger et al. (2025).
- Maisch et al. (2025) describe a diverse assemblage of Miocene-Pliocene sharks and rays from the strata of the Peace River and Tamiami formations from the submerged continental shelf near Venice (Florida, United States).
- Evidence from the study of isolated teeth of living and fossil lamniform sharks, indicative of utility of geometric morphometrics for identification of isolated fossil teeth, is presented by Pagliuzzi et al. (2025).

== Ray-finned fishes ==
Name	Novelty	Status	Authors	Age	Type locality	Location	Notes	Images
Acronichthys	Gen. et sp. nov		Liu et al.	Late Cretaceous (Maastrichtian)	Scollard Formation	Canada (Alberta)	A member of Otophysi of uncertain affinities, the type genus of the new family Acronichthyidae. The type species is A. maccagnoi.	
Alienagobius	Gen. et sp. nov	Valid	Reichenbacher & Bannikov	Miocene (Serravallian)	Karpov Yar Locality	Moldova	A member of the family Oxudercidae. The type species is A. pygmaeus.	
Ammutichthys	Gen. et sp. nov	Valid	Calzoni, Giusberti & Carnevale	Eocene	Chiusole Formation	Italy	A member of Percomorphacea of uncertain affinities. The type species is A. loricatus.	
Antarctichthys	Gen. et sp. nov		Gallo et al.	Late Cretaceous (Campanian)	Snow Hill Island Formation	Antarctica	A member of the family Dercetidae. The type species is A. longipectoralis.	
Apholidotus	Gen. et sp. nov	Valid	Lund, Grogan & Jacob	Carboniferous (Serpukhovian)	Bear Gulch Limestone	United States (Montana)	An early ray-finned fish. Genus includes new species A. ossuous.	Apholidotus ossuous
Archaeosiilik	Gen. et sp. nov	Valid	Brinkman et al.	Late Cretaceous (Maastrichtian)	Prince Creek Formation	United States (Alaska)	A member of the family Esocidae. The type species is A. gilmulli.	
Argyropelecus iranicus	Sp. nov	Valid	Ridolfi et al.	Eocene (Bartonian)	Pabdeh Formation	Iran	A species of Argyropelecus.	
Argyropelecus zagrosensis	Sp. nov	Valid	Ridolfi et al.	Eocene (Bartonian)	Pabdeh Formation	Iran	A species of Argyropelecus.	
Armigatus simonettoi	Sp. nov		Amalfitano et al.	Early Cretaceous (Hauterivian–Barremian)		Italy		
Beukidercetis	Gen. et comb. et sp. nov	Valid	Heere et al.	Late Cretaceous (Maastrichtian)	Maastricht Formation	Belgium; Netherlands	A member of the family Dercetidae. The type species is "Pelargorhynchus" grandis Wallaard et al. (2019); genus also includes new species B. lissus.	
Britosteus	Gen. et sp. nov	Valid	Martinelli et al.	Late Cretaceous	Adamantina Formation	Brazil	A gar. The type species is B. amarildoi. (Named in 2024; final article published in 2025)	
Buapichthys	Gen. et sp. nov	Valid	Medina-Castañeda, Cantalice & Castañeda-Posadas	Late Cretaceous (Turonian)	Mexcala Formation	Mexico	A member of Crossognathiformes belonging to the group Pachyrhizodontoidei. The type species is B. gracilis. (Named in 2024; final article published in 2025)	
Cacatualepis	Gen. et comb. nov	Valid	Bean	Late Jurassic and Early Cretaceous		Australia	A member of the family Coccolepididae. The type species is "Coccolepis" australis Woodward (1895); genus also includes "Coccolepis" woodwardi Waldman (1971).	Cacatualepis woodwardi
Caprovesposus daniltshenkoi	Sp. nov	Valid	Bannikov, Tyler & Tyler	Miocene	Maikop Group	Russia (Krasnodar Krai)	A member of the family Acanthuridae.	
Carlomonnius carnevalei	Sp. nov	Valid	Reichenbacher, Bannikov & Erpenbeck	Eocene (Ypresian)	Monte Bolca	Italy	A member of the family Butidae.	
Caturus enkopicaudalis	Sp. nov	Valid	Ebert & López-Arbarello	Late Jurassic (Kimmeridgian and Tithonian)		Germany		
Caudadercetis taverni	Sp. nov	Valid	Heere et al.	Late Cretaceous (Maastrichtian)	Maastricht Formation	Belgium; Netherlands	A member of the family Dercetidae.	
Chanos chautus	Sp. nov	Valid	Guadarrama & Cantalice	Paleocene (Danian)	Tenejapa-Lacandón Formation	Mexico	A relative of the milkfish.	
Chiarachromis	Gen. et sp. nov	Valid	Bellwood, Bannikov & Zorzin	Eocene	Monte Bolca	Italy	A damselfish. The type species is C. salazzarii.	
Chilomycterus dzonotensis	Sp. nov	Valid	Cantalice et al.	Neogene (Messinian/Zanclean)	Carrillo Puerto Formation	Mexico	A species of Chilomycterus.	
Cryptograciles	Gen. et 2 sp. nov	Valid	Reichenbacher & Bannikov	Miocene (Serravallian)	Karpov Yar Locality	Moldova	A member of the family Oxudercidae. The type species is C. conicus; genus also includes C. robustus.	
Cynoscion cionei	Sp. nov		Noriega et al.	Miocene		Argentina	A species of Cynoscion.	
Cyranichthys sideralis	Sp. nov	Valid	Heere et al.	Late Cretaceous (Maastrichtian)	Maastricht Formation	Belgium; Netherlands	A member of the family Dercetidae.	
Dibango	Gen. et sp. nov	Valid	Davesne & Carnevale	Eocene	Monte Bolca	Italy	A member of Percomorpha of uncertain affinities. The type species is D. volans.	
Eogorgon	Gen. et sp. nov	Valid	Calzoni, Giusberti & Carnevale	Eocene	Chiusole Formation	Italy	A medusafish. The type species is E. bizzarinii.	
Eomyctophum mainardii	Sp. nov	Valid	Calzoni, Giusberti & Carnevale	Eocene	Chiusole Formation	Italy	A lanternfish.	
Erebusia	Gen. et sp. nov	Valid	Calzoni, Giusberti & Carnevale	Eocene	Chiusole Formation	Italy	A member of Percomorphacea of uncertain affinities. The type species is E. tenebrae.	
Etelis bathypelagicus	Sp. nov	Valid	Aguilera, De Gracia, Rodriguez & Buckup in Aguilera et al.	Miocene	Chagres Formation	Panama	A species of Etelis.	
Ferruaspis	Gen. et sp. nov		McCurry et al.	Middle Miocene	McGraths Flat	Australia	A member of Osmeriformes. The type species is F. brocksi	
Gerpegezhus daniaoriundus	Sp. nov	Valid	Schrøder & Carnevale	Eocene	Fur Formation	Denmark	A member of Syngnathoidei belonging to the superfamily Centriscoidea and the family Gerpegezhidae.	
Gymnothorax pierreolivieri	Sp. nov		Aguilera et al.	Miocene	Gatun Formation	Panama	A species of Gymnothorax.	
Habroichthys bosi	Sp. nov		Conedera et al.	Middle Triassic (Anisian)	Strelovec Formation	Slovenia		
Habroichthys celarci	Sp. nov		Conedera et al.	Middle Triassic (Anisian)	Strelovec Formation	Slovenia		
Habroichthys dincae	Sp. nov		Conedera et al.	Middle Triassic (Ladinian)	Sciliar Formation	Italy		
Habroichthys flaviae	Sp. nov		Conedera et al.	Middle Triassic (Ladinian)	Cunardo Formation	Italy		
Habroichthys nietorum	Sp. nov		Conedera et al.	Middle Triassic (Anisian)		Slovenia		
Habroichthys veronikae	Sp. nov		Conedera et al.	Middle Triassic (Anisian)	Strelovec Formation	Slovenia		
Habroichthys zuitaensis	Sp. nov		Conedera et al.	Middle Triassic (Ladinian)	Sciliar Formation	Italy		
Iratusichthys	Gen. et sp. nov	Valid	Schrøder & Carnevale	Early Eocene	Ølst Formation	Denmark	A probable member of the stem group of Lampriformes. The type species is I. ulrikii.	
Kalops loganensis	Sp. nov	Valid	Shen	Carboniferous (Pennsylvanian)	Staunton Formation	United States (Indiana)	An early ray-finned fish.	
Keasichthys	Gen. et sp. nov		Murray & Champagne	Oligocene	Keasey Formation	United States (Oregon)	A flatfish. The type species is K. oregonensis.	
Krampusichthys	Gen. et sp. nov	Valid	Calzoni, Giusberti & Carnevale	Eocene	Chiusole Formation	Italy	A member of the family Gempylidae. The type species is K. tridentinus.	
Laurinichthys	Gen. et sp. nov	Valid	Calzoni, Giusberti & Carnevale	Eocene	Chiusole Formation	Italy	A member of the family Gempylidae. The type species is L. boschelei.	
Moldavigobius gloriae	Sp. nov	Valid	Reichenbacher & Bannikov	Miocene (Serravallian)	Karpov Yar Locality	Moldova	A member of the family Gobiidae.	
Mostarpycnodus	Gen. et sp. nov	Valid	Capasso & Mulaomerović	Late Cretaceous (Cenomanian)		Bosnia and Herzegovina	A member of the family Pycnodontidae. The type species is M. hercegensis.	
Moythomasia lebedevi	Sp. nov	Valid	Plax, Bakaev & Naugolnykh	Devonian (Givetian)	Stolin Beds	Belarus		
Nunikuluk	Gen. et sp. nov	Valid	Brinkman et al.	Late Cretaceous (Maastrichtian)	Prince Creek Formation	United States (Alaska)	A member of the family Esocidae. The type species is N. gracilis.	
Oligobothus polonicus	Sp. nov		Kovalchuk et al.	Oligocene (Rupelian)	Menilite Formation	Poland	A member of the family Bothidae.	
Oligosolea	Gen. et sp. nov		Kovalchuk et al.	Oligocene (Rupelian)	Menilite Formation	Poland	A member of the family Soleidae. Genus includes new species O. carpathica.	
Paralates simpsoni	Sp. nov	Valid	Bauer & Reichenbacher in Bauer et al.	Eocene (Priabonian)		United Kingdom	A stem-freshwater sleeper.	
Parapropercarina	Gen. et sp. nov	Valid	Schrøder, Přikryl & Carnevale	Eocene	Fur Formation	Denmark	A member of Stromateoidei. The type species is P. multispinata.	
Petrodercetis	Gen. et sp. nov	Valid	Heere et al.	Late Cretaceous (Maastrichtian)	Maastricht Formation	Netherlands	A member of the family Dercetidae. The type species is P. bidirectus.	
Phacodus arghiusii	Sp. nov		Trif & Szabó	Eocene		Romania	A member of Pycnodontiformes.	
Phacodus scrobiculatus	Comb. nov		(Reuss)	Cretaceous		Czech Republic	A member of Pycnodontiformes; moved from "Pycnodus" scrobiculatus Reuss (1844).	
Pinichthys werneri	Sp. nov	Valid	Bannikov	Miocene		Russia (Krasnodar Krai)		
Polazzodus mihalyfii	Sp. nov	Valid	Szabó & Cawley	Late Cretaceous (Santonian)	Csehbánya Formation	Hungary	A member of the family Pycnodontidae.	
Propercarina occidentalis	Sp. nov		Micklich & Přikryl	Oligocene		Germany		
Sardinops humboldti	Sp. nov		Carnevale et al.	Miocene	Pisco Formation	Peru	A species of Sardinops.	
Saurichthys justitias	Sp. nov		Stack et al.	Late Triassic (?Norian)	Dockum Group	United States (Texas)		
Scopeloides bellator	Sp. nov	Valid	Calzoni, Giusberti & Carnevale	Eocene	Chiusole Formation	Italy	A member of the family Gonostomatidae.	
Scopeloides violator	Sp. nov	Valid	Calzoni, Giusberti & Carnevale	Eocene	Chiusole Formation	Italy	A member of the family Gonostomatidae.	
Simocormus seyboldi	Sp. nov		Maxwell et al.	Late Jurassic (Kimmeridgian)	Nusplingen Limestone	Germany	A member of the family Pachycormidae.	
Sivulliusalmo	Gen. et sp. nov	Valid	Brinkman et al.	Late Cretaceous (Maastrichtian)	Prince Creek Formation	United States (Alaska)	A member of the family Salmonidae. The type species is S. alaskensis.	
Solterichthys	Gen. et sp. nov	Valid	Calzoni, Giusberti & Carnevale	Eocene	Chiusole Formation	Italy	A member of the family Phosichthyidae. The type species is S. macrognathus.	
Sooinichthys	Gen. et sp. nov		Alvarado-Ortega, Otero & Mayrinck	Early Cretaceous (Albian)		Mexico	A member of Otophysi of uncertain affinities. The type species is S. varii.	
Sphyragnathus	Gen. et sp. nov		Wilson, Mansky & Anderson	Carboniferous (Tournaisian)	Horton Bluff Formation	Canada (Nova Scotia)	An early ray-finned fish. The type species is S. tyche.	
Tahnaichthys	Gen. et sp. nov	Valid	Pacheco-Ordaz, Mejía & Alvarado-Ortega	Early Cretaceous (Albian)	Tlayúa Formation	Mexico	A member of the family Pycnodontidae. The type species is T. magnuserrata. (Named in 2024; final article published in 2025)	
Tenupiscis	Gen. et sp. nov	Valid	Stack, Gottfried & Stocker	Permian (Kungurian)	Minnekahta Formation	United States (South Dakota)	An early ray-finned fish. The type species is T. dakotaensis.	
Thrissops ettlingensis	Sp. nov	Valid	Ebert	Late Jurassic (Tithonian)		Germany		
Thrissops kimmeridgensis	Sp. nov	Valid	Ebert	Late Jurassic (Kimmeridgian)	Kimmeridge Clay	United Kingdom		
Wudelenia	Gen. et sp. nov	Valid	Calzoni, Giusberti & Carnevale	Eocene	Chiusole Formation	Italy	A member of the family Gempylidae. The type species is W. diabolica.	
Zealandorhynchus	Gen. et sp. nov		Rust et al.	Eocene	Kurinui Formation	New Zealand	A billfish. The type species is Z. fordycei. (Named in 2025; final article published in 2026)	
Zorzinichthys annei	Sp. nov	Valid	Bannikov & Zorzin	Eocene (Ypresian)	Monte Bolca	Italy	A member of Perciformes belonging to the family Zorzinichthyidae.	

=== Otolith taxa ===
Name	Novelty	Status	Authors	Age	Type locality	Location	Notes	Images
Acanthocepola adamantis	Sp. nov	Valid	Schwarzhans & Cotton	Oligocene	Pande Formation	Tanzania	A species of Acanthocepola.	
Archaeotolithus solidus	Sp. nov		Pindakiewicz et al.	Jurassic		Poland		
"Blennius" ignotus	Sp. nov	Valid	Schwarzhans & Radwańska	Miocene		Poland	A combtooth blenny of uncertain generic placement.	
Bregmaceros tanzaniensis	Sp. nov	Valid	Schwarzhans & Cotton	Oligocene	Pande Formation	Tanzania	A codlet.	
Carapus lentus	Sp. nov	Valid	Schwarzhans & Radwańska	Miocene		Austria; Poland	A species of Carapus.	
Cataetyx lacrimatus	Sp. nov	Valid	Schwarzhans	Miocene (Serravallian)		Austria	A species of Cataetyx.	
Chaetodon europaeus	Sp. nov	Valid	Schwarzhans & Radwańska	Miocene		Poland	A species of Chaetodon.	
Chiloconger aflorens	Sp. nov	Valid	Lin & O'Dea	Miocene	Chagres Formation	Panama	A species of Chiloconger.	
Coelorinchus adventicius	Sp. nov	Valid	Schwarzhans & Radwańska	Miocene		Czech Republic	A species of Coelorinchus.	
Conger kovalchuki	Sp. nov	Valid	Schwarzhans & Radwańska	Miocene		Poland; Austria?	A species of Conger.	
Cubiceps huimanni	Sp. nov	Valid	Schwarzhans	Miocene (Serravallian)		Austria	A species of Cubiceps.	
Dasyscopelus inopinatus	Sp. nov	Valid	Lin & O'Dea	Miocene	Chagres Formation	Panama	A species of Dasyscopelus.	
Eleotris pannonicus	Sp. nov	Valid	Schwarzhans	Miocene		Hungary	A species of Eleotris.	
Gadella vera	Sp. nov	Valid	Schwarzhans & Radwańska	Miocene		Poland	A species of Gadella.	
Gadiculus weinfurteri	Sp. nov	Valid	Schwarzhans	Miocene		Austria	A species of Gadiculus.	
Globogobius praeglobosus	Sp. nov	Valid	Schwarzhans	Miocene (Serravallian)		Austria	A goby.	
Gobius brocchus	Sp. nov	Valid	Schwarzhans & Radwańska	Miocene		Austria	A species of Gobius.	
Gobius inops	Sp. nov	Valid	Schwarzhans & Radwańska	Miocene		Austria	A species of Gobius.	
Gymnoscopelus septentrionalis	Sp. nov	Valid	Schwarzhans	Miocene (Serravallian)		Austria	A species of Gymnoscopelus.	
Hoplostethus boyae	Sp. nov	Valid	Lin & O'Dea	Miocene	Chagres Formation	Panama	A species of Hoplostethus.	
Hoplunnis schultzi	Sp. nov	Valid	Schwarzhans & Radwańska	Miocene		Austria	A species of Hoplunnis.	
Juraelops	Gen. et sp. nov		Pindakiewicz et al.	Jurassic		United Kingdom	Genus includes new species J. prodigiosum.	
Krefftichthys walbersdorfensis	Sp. nov	Valid	Schwarzhans	Miocene (Serravallian)		Austria	A species of Krefftichthys.	
Lesueurigobius aetomatus	Sp. nov	Valid	Schwarzhans & Radwańska	Miocene		Austria	A species of Lesueurigobius.	
Lophiodes pitassyae	Sp. nov	Valid	Schwarzhans	Miocene (Serravallian)		Austria	A species of Lophiodes.	
Malacanthus bratishkoi	Sp. nov	Valid	Schwarzhans	Miocene (Serravallian)		Austria	A species of Malacanthus.	
Malakichthys schwarzhansi	Sp. nov	Valid	Lin & O'Dea	Miocene	Chagres Formation	Panama	A species of Malakichthys.	
Neomerinthe pinguis	Sp. nov	Valid	Schwarzhans & Radwańska	Miocene		Czech Republic	A species of Neomerinthe.	
Odondebuenia austriaca	Sp. nov	Valid	Schwarzhans & Radwańska	Miocene		Austria	A relative of the Coralline goby.	
Ortugobius pandeanus	Sp. nov	Valid	Schwarzhans & Cotton	Oligocene	Pande Formation	Tanzania	A member of the family Gobiidae.	
Palaspius	Gen. et sp. nov	Valid	Schwarzhans	Miocene (Serravallian)		Austria	A member of the family Leuciscidae. The type species is P. extremus.	
Palealbula crenulata	Sp. nov		Pindakiewicz et al.	Jurassic		United Kingdom		
Palealbula ventai	Sp. nov		Pindakiewicz et al.	Jurassic		Lithuania		
Pannonigadus	Gen. et comb. nov	Valid	Schwarzhans	Miocene		Austria	A member of the family Gadidae. The type species is "Otolithus (Gadidarum)" ponticum Weinfurter (1954).	
Panturichthys tersus	Sp. nov	Valid	Schwarzhans & Radwańska	Miocene		Austria	A species of Panturichthys.	
Paraplesiopoma	Gen. et sp. et comb. nov	Valid	Trif & Schwarzhans in Trif et al.	Late Cretaceous (Santonian and Campanian)	Bozeș Formation	Romania; Spain	A possible basal member of Percomorpha. The type species is P. transylvanica; genus also includes "genus Acropomatidarum" bagassianus Nolf (2003) and "genus Haemulidarum" santonianus Nolf (2003).	
Physiculus pinnatus	Sp. nov	Valid	Schwarzhans	Miocene (Serravallian)		Austria	A species of Physiculus.	
Ponticola planodorsalis	Sp. nov	Valid	Schwarzhans	Miocene		Austria	A species of Ponticola.	
Prionotus friedmani	Sp. nov	Valid	Schwarzhans	Miocene (Serravallian)		Austria	A species of Prionotus.	
Protalbula dorsetensis	Sp. nov		Pindakiewicz et al.	Jurassic		United Kingdom		
Protanago africanus	Sp. nov	Valid	Schwarzhans & Cotton	Oligocene	Pande Formation	Tanzania	A member of the family Congridae.	
Pseudonansenia	Gen. et sp. nov	Valid	Schrøder, Carnevale & Schwarzhans	Paleocene (Selandian)	Lellinge Greensand	Denmark	A member of Argentiniformes. The type species is P. hauniensis.	
Pseudopampus	Gen. et comb. nov	Valid	Schwarzhans & Radwańska	Miocene		Austria; Czech Republic; Germany	A member of the family Stromateidae. The type species is "Otolithus (Cantharus?)" tietzei Schubert (1906).	
Pteralbula jurassica	Sp. nov		Pindakiewicz et al.	Jurassic		United Kingdom		
Pterothrissus solidus	Sp. nov	Valid	Schwarzhans & Radwańska	Miocene		Czech Republic	A relative of the Japanese gissu.	
Sargocentron viennensis	Sp. nov	Valid	Schwarzhans	Miocene (Serravallian)		Austria	A species of Sargocentron.	
Scorpaena cibaria	Sp. nov	Valid	Schwarzhans & Radwańska	Miocene		Poland	A species of Scorpaena.	
Serranus lautus	Sp. nov	Valid	Schwarzhans & Radwańska	Miocene		Austria	A species of Serranus.	
"Serranus" plasmaticus	Sp. nov	Valid	Schwarzhans & Cotton	Oligocene	Pande Formation	Tanzania	A member of the family Serranidae.	
Toxopyge bradicae	Sp. nov	Valid	Schwarzhans	Miocene		Austria	A goby.	
Vanneaugobius voeslauensis	Sp. nov	Valid	Schwarzhans & Radwańska	Miocene		Austria	A species of Vanneaugobius.	
Vodyanoi	Gen. et 2 sp. nov		Pindakiewicz et al.	Middle Jurassic		Poland	A teleost of uncertain affinities. The type species is V. schwarzhansi; genus also includes V. stringeri.	

=== Ray-finned fish research ===
- A study on the development of teeth of a stem ray-finned fish specimen from the Devonian Gneudna Formation (Australia), providing evidence of similarities with the organization of lungfish tooth plates, is published by Chen (2025).
- Igielman et al. (2025) study the anatomy of lower jaws of Devonian ray-finned fishes, report evidence of overall similarity in similarity in gross shape and composition, but also report evidence of differences that might be related to a previously unrecognized functional diversity.
- Flannery Sutherland et al. (2025) interpret the fossil record of early ray-finned fishes as suggestive of their cryptic diversification in the Late Devonian instead of an explosive radiation in the Carboniferous, as well as suggestive of high lineage survivorship across the Hangenberg event.
- Wilson, Mansky & Anderson (2025) describe occipital ossifications of two ray-finned fishes from the Tournaisian Horton Bluff Formation (Nova Scotia, Canada), and report similarities of one of the studied specimens to early-diverging Devonian ray-finned fishes, as well as similarities of the other specimen to later, Carboniferous taxa, providing new information on diversity of ray-finned fishes from the Horton Bluff Formation.
- Mo, Caron & Coates (2025) revise Rhadinichthys ornatissimus and reinterpret Woodichthys bearsdeni as a species belonging to the genus Rhadinichthys.
- Giles, Kolmann & Friedman (2025) describe a specimen of Platysomus parvulus from the Carboniferous Pennine Middle Coal Measures Formation (Staffordshire, England, United Kingdom) preserving evidence of presence of enlarged basibranchial tooth plates opposing an upper tooth field including small, pointed teeth on the surface of the vomer and longitudinal bands of teeth on the entopterygoids, representing the earliest record of a tongue-bite mechanism in a ray-finned fish reported to date.
- A study on the composition of the ray-finned fish assemblages from Permian localities in the Nizhny Novgorod Oblast (Russia) is published by Karaseva & Bakaev (2025).
- A study on the evolution of ray-finned fish assemblages known from the Permian and Triassic strata of the Kuznetsk Basin (Russia) is published by Bakaev & Karaseva (2025).
- Redescription of Palaeoniscum delessei is published by Gonçalves & Luccisano (2025), who synonymise this species to Aeduella blainvillei.
- Gonçalves & Luccisano (2025) redescribe all the aeduellid specimens from the Decazeville Basin (Aveyron, France), and carry out a phylogenetic analysis of this family including the other actinopterygians of the Permo-Carboniferous of Europe. They highlight that the aeduellids present in the Decazeville Basin are Aeduella blainvillei and Decazella vetteri.
- Redescription and a study on the phylogenetic affinities of Pteronisculus gunnari is published by Cavicchini et al. (2025).
- Romanov, Shakhparonov & Korzun (2025) study the force distribution in the skull of Pteronisculus to determine the function of its symplectic bone, and report possible evidence of presence of a mouth-opening mechanism different from those seen in extant bony fishes.
- Cooper et al. (2025) study the skull roof anatomy of Gyrosteus mirabilis, and interpret both G. mirabilis and Strongylosteus hindenburgi as species distinct from Chondrosteus acipenseroides.
- Miyata et al. (2025) describe fossil material of a sturgeon from the Maastrichtian Hakobuchi Formation (Japan), representing the first record of a sturgeon from the Upper Cretaceous strata in East Asia.
- Stack (2025) studies the phylogenetic relationships of extant and extinct ray-finned fishes, and recovers bobasatraniids and guildayichthyids as placed outside Neopterygii.
- Capasso & Witzmann (2025) identify pycnodontomorph specimens with supernumerary rays of dorsal and anal fins, and interpret the studied anomalies as likely atavisms and as evidence supporting the interpretation of pycnodontomorph as basal neopterygians.
- A study on the morphological variation of dentary bones of members of Gyrodontiformes and Pycnodontiformes is published by Capasso, Zorzin & Duffin (2025).
- Fossil material of Eomesodon sp., representing the oldest record of pycnodonts from Gondwana reported to date, is described from the Middle Jurassic (Bajocian) Jaisalmer Formation (India) by Ghosh, Kumar & Swami (2025).
- Pacheco-Ordaz, Reyes-López & Alvarado-Ortega (2025) identify a specimen of Paranursallia gutturosa from the Turonian strata from the San José de Gracia Quarry (Mexico), assign further nursalliine pycnodontid specimens from the Agua Nueva Formation to the same species, and discard report of the presence of Nursallia tethyensis in the Turonian strata of the Huehuetla Quarry.
- Fossil material of cf. Coelodus sp., representing the first vertebrate material reported from the Santonian Jákó Marl Formation (Hungary), is described by Szabó, Haas & Cawley (2025).
- Tintori (2025) reports the discovery of fossil material of Thoracopterus wushaensis (otherwise known from the Xingyi Fauna from southwestern China) from the Ladinian strata from the Pelsa/Vazzoler fossil site (Sciliar Formation, Italy).
- Brinkman et al. (2025) study the composition of the ray-finned fish assemblage from the Turonian Bissekty Formation (Uzbekistan), reporting evidence of presence of basal neopterygians and teleosts (mostly members of early-diverging lineages, but also a characiform and an acanthomorph) and evidence of differences in composition between the studied assemblage and earlier Cenomanian assemblages from Laurasia, and link the reported differences to climate changes and intercontinental dispersal events.
- Gardner, Brinkman & Murray (2025) identify the holotype of Arotus hieroglyphus as a scale of a holostean fish.
- Hunt & Lucas (2025) describe a regurgitalite from the Upper Jurassic Morrison Formation in Utah, United States (preserving amphibian bones and likely produced by an amioid fish), and name new ichnotaxon Purgotybaris fosteri.
- Redescription and a study on the affinities of Guizhoubrachysomus minor, interpreted as a basal dapediid, is published by Xu et al. (2025).
- A study on the anatomy and affinities of "Semionotus" manselii is published by Ebert & Etches (2025), who transfer this species to the genus Brachyichthys.
- Ribeiro-Souza et al. (2025) revise ganoid scales from the Alcântara Formation (Brazil), and interpret the studied fossil material as belonging to at least three lepisosteiform taxa.
- Ganoid scales probably representing the oldest fossil material of Lepisosteus reported from Southern Hemisphere are described from the Albian–Cenomanian Açu Formation (Brazil) by Costa et al. (2025).
- Gar remains representing the first record of this group from the Late Cretaceous of Japan are described from the Turonian Mifune Group by Ikegami, Yabumoto & Brito (2025).
- Ebert & Kölbl-Ebert (2025) identify teleost and crustacean remains within gastrointestinal tracts attached to fossil material of Aspidorhynchus from the Upper Jurassic strata in Germany preserving fossils of animals from the Solnhofen Archipelago.
- Miyazato et al. (2025) describe two partial aspidorhynchid skulls from the Upper Cretaceous Dinosaur Park Formation (Alberta, Canada), providing new information on the anatomy of the skulls of members of the group (including the braincase and the sensory canals), interpreted as indicating that aspidorhynchids were unlikely to be teleosts.
- A study on the scale histology of Pachycormus is published by Maxwell & Cooper (2025).
- Fossil material of the oldest hypsocormine pachycormid reported to date is described from the Toarcian Posidonia Shale (Germany) by Cooper & Maxwell (2025).
- Kanarkina, Zverkov & Popov (2025) identify fin fragments of members of the genus Bonnerichthys from the Campanian strata of the Rybushka Formation (Saratov Oblast, Russia), representing the first record of fossils of this genus outside the United States.
- Ebert & Kölbl-Ebert (2025) report the discovery of specimens of Tharsis from the Upper Jurassic strata of the Plattenkalk basins of Eichstätt or Solnhofen Basin (Germany) found with belemnites lodged in their mouth and gill apparatus, and interpret the studied specimens as sucking remnants of belemnite soft tissue of algal or bacterial overgrowth and accidentally sucking belemnites into their mouth, resulting in suffocation.
- Evidence of variation of morphology of the gastrointestinal tract of teleosts from the Barremian La Huérguina Formation (Spain) is presented by San Román, Marugán Lobón & Martín-Abad (2025).
- Brinkman et al. (2025) compare the composition of teleost assemblages from the Maastrichtian Hell Creek Formation and from the Paleocene Fort Union Formation (Montana, United States) and Ravenscrag Formation (Saskatchewan, Canada), and find that the Cretaceous–Paleogene extinction event mainly affected taxa that were already rare in the Maastrichtian, but also find evidence of reduced taxonomic richness of teleosts during the early Paleocene.
- Serafini et al. (2025) identify a plethodid rostrum from the Upper Cretaceous (Campanian-Maastrichtian) strata from northern Italy, preserving evidence of presence of cranial and dental traits convergent with those of extant billfishes.
- A study on fossil melanin in an eye of a probable specimen of Dastilbe crandalli from the Crato Formation (Brazil), providing evidence of high density but low diversity of melanosomes from the retinal pigment epithelium which might be indicative of limited visual capabilities of the studied fish, is published by Prado et al. (2025).
- Redescription and a study on the affinities of Plesioschizothorax macrocephalus is published by Yang et al. (2025).
- Přikryl et al. (2025) describe fossil material of Luciobarbus graellsii from the Pliocene strata from the Camp dels Ninots site (Spain), and interpret the studied fossils as indicating that the species was able to adapt to environmental changes from the warmest period of the Pliocene to the coldest period of the Pleistocene.
- Murray, Brinkman & Krause (2025) identify fossil material of at least three acanthomorph (probably percomorph) taxa from the Maastrichtian strata in the Mahajanga Basin (Madagascar), interpreted as likely evidence of a single invasion of Madagascan fresh waters during the Cretaceous.
- Khalloufi et al. (2025) describe new fossil material of Phosphichthys thomasi from the Eocene strata of the Oulad Abdoun Basin (Morocco), providing new information on the anatomy of the studied species, and interpret Phosphichthys as an acanthomorph of uncertain affinities.
- Carnevale & Bannikov (2025) redescribe Protorhamphosus parvulus, and confirm its placement within Syngnathoidei and are unable to determine its exact phylogenetic affinities within this group.
- Schwarzhans & Bannikov (2025) report the first discovery of a specimen of Pinichthys shirvanensis from the Miocene strata of the North Shirvanskaya Formation (Krasnodar Krai, Russia) preserved with an otolith, and transfer the otolith-based taxon "Stromateus" steurbauti Schwarzhans (1994) to the genus Pinichthys.
- Revision of Oligocene palaeorhynchids from Romania is published by Grădianu, Monsch & Baciu (2025).
- Chanet (2025) revises the anatomy and affinities of the Miocene scaldfish Arnoglossus sauvagei.
- Bannikov & Zorzin (2025) redescribe the holotype of purported aulorhynchid Protaulopsis bolcensis, and reinterpret is as a junior synonym of Rhamphognathus paralepoides.
- A study on changes of morphology of teeth of haplochromine cichlids in Lake Victoria during the last 17,000 years, providing evidence of rapid morphological diversification during the first three millennia of the radiation (even before the definitive establishment of modern deep lake conditions), is published by Ngoepe et al. (2025) .
- Redescription of Zignoichthys oblongus, based on data from new fossil material from the Pesciara site of the Bolca locality (Italy), is published by Ridolfi et al. (2025).
- Collareta et al. (2025) report the discovery of fused dentaries of an ocean sunfish from the Lower Pliocene strata of the Siena-Radicofani Basin (Italy), representing the first finding of fossil material of a member of this group in post-Miocene strata outside North America.
- Přikryl et al. (2025) report the presence of fossil material of an indeterminate goby and members of the genera Herklotsichthys and Ophisternon in the Pleistocene Laguna Formation (Philippines).
- Dalla Vecchia et al. (2025) report the discovery of a new assemblage of Late Cretaceous (possibly Campanian-Maastrichtian) fishes from the Friuli Carbonate Platform (Italy), dominated by pycnodontiforms and basal non-acanthomorph teleosts.
- Dubikovska et al. (2025) study the composition of the Miocene fish assemblage from the Mykolaiv Beds (Ukraine), and report the first discovery of fossil material of Acanthurus haueri, Oligodiodon sp. and indeterminate diodontids and tetraodontiforms of uncertain familiar placement from the Forecarpathian Basin.
- Evidence of changes of diversity of ray-finned fishes from the south of Eastern Europe (Moldova, Russia and Ukraine) from the late Miocene to the late Pleistocene is presented by Barkaszi & Kovalchuk (2025).
- Brinkman et al (2025) document the paleoichthyofauna of the early Maastrichtian-aged Prince Creek Formation of Alaska, including the descriptions of new genera (Nunikuluk, Archaeosiilik, Sivulliusalmo), the first documentation of several previously-described taxa (Oldmanesox, Horseshoeichthys) within the formation, and the oldest known fossil record of Cypriniformes.
- Melendez-Vazquez et al. (2025) link the evolution of endothermy in ray-finned fishes with evolution of large body size, adaptations to distinct swimming modes, and interactions with cetaceans during the Eocene-Miocene.
- A study on changes of diversity of bony fishes in Chile from the Neogene to the present is published by Oyanadel-Urbina et al. (2025).

== Lobe-finned fishes ==
Name	Novelty	Status	Authors	Age	Type locality	Location	Notes	Images
Onychodus mikijuk	Sp. nov		Goodchild et al.	Devonian (Frasnian)	Nordstrand Point Formation	Canada (Nunavut)		
Paleolophus	Gen. et sp. nov		Qiao et al.	Devonian (Pragian)	Posongchong Formation	China	A lungfish. The type species is P. yunnanensis.	
Sagenodus hibernicus	Sp. nov	Valid	Smithson et al.	Carboniferous		Ireland	A lungfish.	
Whiteia anniae	Sp. nov		Dai et al.	Early Triassic (Olenekian)	Helongshan Formation	China	A coelacanth.	

=== Lobe-finned fish research ===
- Babcock (2025) revises the type specimens of Onychodus sigmoides and O. hopkinsi, and interprets the latter taxon as a junior synonym of the former one.
- Review of the completeness of the fossil record of coelacanths is published by Yuan, Cavin & Song (2025).
- Cui et al. (2025) provide new information on the anatomy of Styloichthys changae, and study the evolution of cosmine in lobe-finned fishes.
- Ferrante & Cavin (2025) study the phylogenetic relationships of extant and fossil members of Actinistia, and name a new family Axeliidae and new subfamilies Diplurinae and Mawsoniinae.
- Quinn et al. (2025) revise the coelacanth fossil material from the Rhaetian strata in the United Kingdom.
- Fossil material of an indeterminate latimeriid, representing the first record of the family from the Lower Jurassic strata in Germany, is described from the Toarcian Posidonia Shale by Cooper (2025).
- Barbosa et al. (2025) describe a juvenile specimen of Axelrodichthys araripensis from the Lower Cretaceous Romualdo Formation (Brazil), and interpret the studied coelacanth as likely to be a marine fish that bred in shallow waters.
- Gottfried (2025) describes fossil material of a member of the genus Axelrodichthys from the Aptian strata from the "Fish Mountain" site near Ingal (Niger).
- Evidence from the study of mechanical performance of lungfish mandibles from the Devonian Gogo Formation (Australia), indicating that mandible morphology and dentition type both had impact on stress and strain distribution during biting, is presented by Bland et al. (2025), who interpret their findings as consistent with niche specialization of the studied lungfishes.
- Szrek et al. (2025) describe lungfish traces from the Devonian (Emsian) strata from the Świętokrzyskie Mountains (Poland), including traces of the snout that anchored in the sediment to create leverage for lifting the body while the fish moved through shallow water or across exposed sediment, and name new ichnotaxa Reptanichnus acutori and Broomichnium ujazdensis.
- Description of the braincase and associated endocast of Durialepis edentatus is published by Friedman et al. (2025).
- A lungfish tooth plate with morphology similar to that of Carboniferous sagenodontids is described from the Devonian (Famennian) Lemgaïrinat Formation (Morocco) by El Fassi El Fehri et al. (2025).
- Pardo et al. (2025) describe a lungfish occiput from the Tournaisian strata of the Horton Group from Blue Beach (Nova Scotia, Canada) sharing characteristics with both holodontids and dipterids, and interpret this finding as evidence that a wider range of lungfish lineages survived the Late Devonian mass extinction.
- Rose et al. (2025) describe new lungfish fossils from the Lower Triassic strata of the Burgersdorp Formation (South Africa), extending known geographical range of Arganodus and Gnathorhiza, and providing evidence of rapid lungfish recovery in the aftermath of the Permian–Triassic extinction event.
- Fossil material of the largest articulated ceratodontiform lungfish from the Triassic reported to date is described from the Anisian Ermaying Formation (Shanxi, China) by Shi et al. (2025).
- Casal et al. (2025) describe a tooth plate of cf. Metaceratodus kaopen from the Upper Cretaceous Lago Colhué Huapí Formation (Argentina), expanding known geographic distribution of this taxon in South America, and interpret the studied specimen as living in environment with warm climate with dry periods.
- Batt et al. (2025) report the discovery of new rhizodontid fossil material from the Tournaisian Ballagan Formation (Scotland, United Kingdom), representing one of the earliest and most complete Carboniferous rhizodontids reported to date.
- Redescription and a study on the affinities of Eusthenodon wangsjoi is published by Downs (2025).
- Evidence indicating that evolution of morphological diversity of early sarcopterygians coincided with and likely was influenced by Devonian to Carboniferous environmental changes is presented by Vanhaesebroucke, Larouche & Cloutier (2025).

== General research ==
- Haridy et al. (2025) identify purported early vertebrate Anatolepis as an arthropod, interpret its purported dentine tubules as sensory structures similar to those present in Cambrian aglaspidids and modern arthropods, and determine the oldest known fossil evidence of vertebrate dental tissues to be middle Ordovician in age.
- Troyer et al. (2025) study the evolution of lower jaws in Silurian and Devonian bony fishes, reporting evidence of high rates of diversification in lungfishes and coelacanths, and evidence of slow rates of evolution and low functional diversity of jaws in ray-finned fishes and tetrapodomorphs.
- Llewelyn et al. (2025) compare fish trait diversity in Devonian communities from the Gogo Formation, Canowindra fish beds in the Mandagery Formation (Australia) and Miguasha (Escuminac Formation; Canada) and in six modern fish communities, and find evidence indicating that Devonian communities were less functionally rich than their modern analogues, evidence of greater trait differentiation and lower functional redundancy among fish in Devonian communities compared to modern ones, and evidence that the Canowindra community was distinct from other Devonian communities as well as from modern fish communities.
- Evidence of preservation of cellular and soft-tissue microstructures in bones of Devonian fishes is presented by Rogoff & Ullmann (2025).
- Dankina et al. (2025) revise the fossil record of Devonian fishes from Belarus and Lithuania.
- Ivanov & Hu (2025) describe fossil material of new fish assemblages (including diverse cartilaginous fishes) from the Carboniferous–lower Permian strata of the Naqing, Narao, and Shanglong deep-water sections (Guizhou, China) and from the Carboniferous (Serpukhovian–Bashkirian) strata of the Sholaksay section (Kazakhstan).
- Gonçalves et al. (2025) report the discovery of a new ichthyological assemblage from the Carboniferous (Gzhelian) Bourran Formation (Aveyron, France), comprising specimens of Orthacanthus sp., cf. Progyrolepis, Acanthodidae indet., Aeduella sp. and Decazella vetteri.
- Andrews, Shirley & Figueroa (2025) report the discovery of a new, diverse fish assemblage from the Carboniferous (Mississippian) Marshall Sandstone (Michigan, United States).
- Hodnett et al. (2025) study the composition of Permian fish assemblages from the Phosphoria, Park City and Shedhorn formations (Wyoming, United States), providing evidence of similarities with the assemblage from the Kaibab Formation in Arizona.
- Swimming trails of fishes with diverse morphologies or swimming behaviors are described from the Permian Salagou Formation (France) by Moreau et al. (2025).
- A teleost jaw preserved with a shark tooth embedded in its surface is described from the Valanginian Rosablanca Formation (Colombia) by Cadena, Guevara-Serrano & Carrillo-Briceño (2025).
- A study on the trophic relationships of fishes from the Romualdo Formation (Brazil), as indicated by mercury concentrations in their fossil remains, is published by Antonietto et al. (2025).
- Pokorný et al. (2025) describe trace fossils produced during death struggle of fishes from the Upper Cretaceous marine sediments in Lebanon, and name new ichnotaxa Pinnichnus haqilensis and P. emmae.
- Laser & Shimada (2025) study the composition of the marine fish assemblage from the Turonian strata of the middle part the Jetmore Chalk Member of the Greenhorn Limestone (Kansas, United States), reporting evidence of similarity of fish assemblages from the middle and upper part of the Jetmore Chalk.
- Capasso (2025) reports the discovery of possible fish remains from the Cretaceous amber from Myanmar and from the Pliocene amber from Madagascar.
- Nelson et al. (2025) describe new fossil material of fishes from the Upper Cretaceous Dinosaur Park Formation (Alberta, Canada), expanding known vertebrate diversity from the studied formation.
- Evidence from the study of the fossil record of fishes from Austria, indicative of increase of elasmobranch abundance and decrease of ray-finned fish density in the Tethys Ocean in the aftermath of the Cretaceous–Paleogene extinction event, is presented by Feichtinger et al. (2025).
- Cicimurri, Stringer & Ebersole (2025) revise fish fossils from the Paleogene strata in Alabama, and identify remains of 21 taxa that were previously not known or recognized as present in the state.
- Deville de Periere et al. (2025) report the discovery of a diverse assemblage of marine fishes from the Eocene Dammam Formation (Saudi Arabia).
- Caposeno et al. (2025) describe new fossil material of fishes from the Eocene Tavda Formation (Kazakhstan), including remains of lamniform sharks, eels, codfishes, mackerels and indeterminate percomorphs and providing evidence of presence of these group in the Turgai Strait before its closure.
- A study on the composition of the fish assemblages from the middle Miocene strata in the northwestern part of the Fore-Carpathian Basin (Poland) is published by Dubikovska et al. (2025).
- Sambou, Diaw & Adnet (2025) report the Discovery of a new marine fish assemblage from the Miocene–Pliocene deposits of the Saloum Formation (Senegal).
- Pallacks et al. (2025) study the fossil record of fish otoliths from the central western Aegean Sea, and report evidence indicating that a period of low oxygenation of mid-depth waters between 10,000 and 7,000 years ago was associated with near absence of mesopelagic fish.
