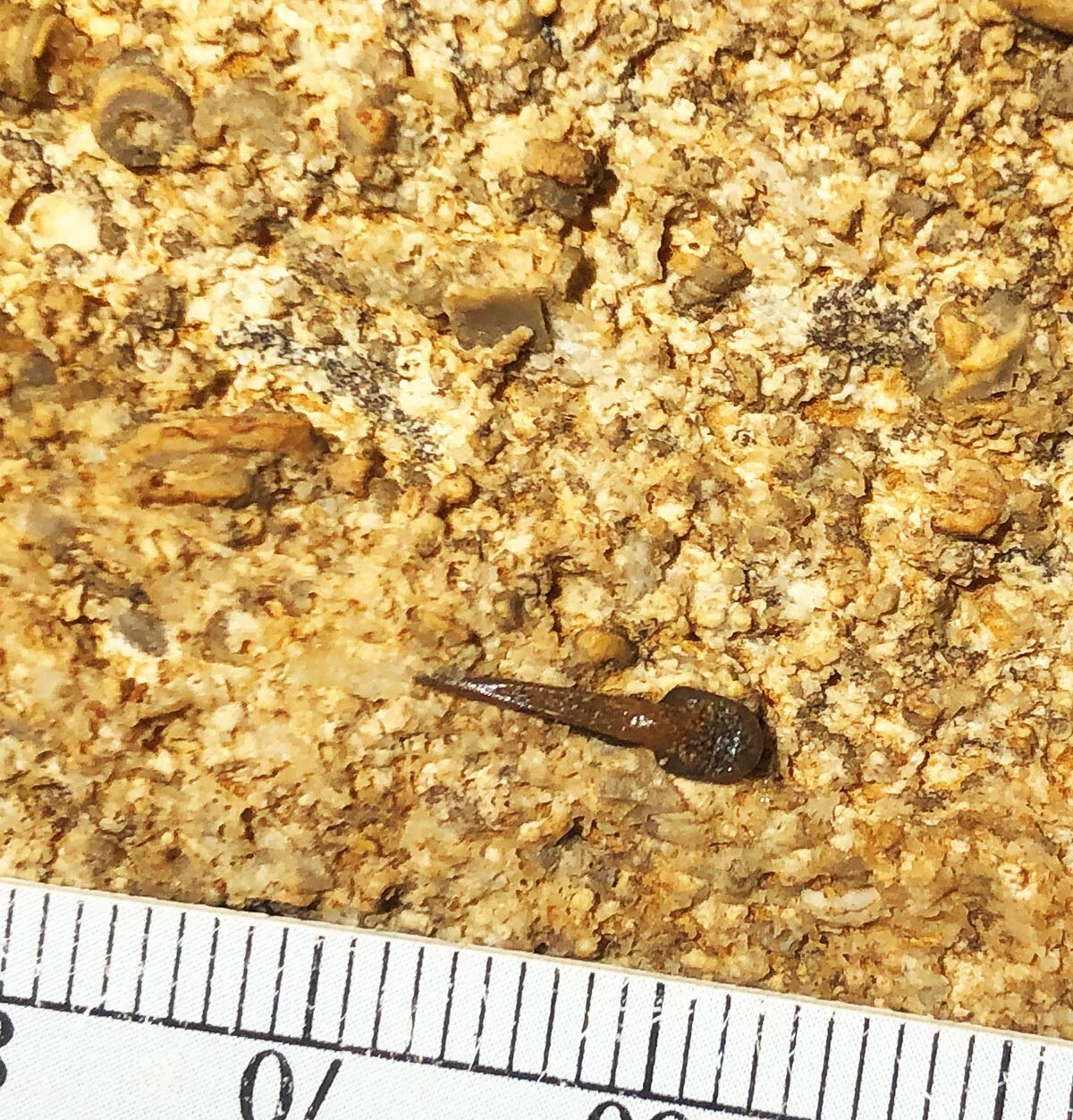
- Holotype specimen of Macadens olsoni

Scientific classification
- Kingdom: Animalia
- Phylum: Chordata
- Class: Chondrichthyes
- Subclass: Holocephali
- Genus: †Macadens; Hodnett, Toomey, Sues, Santucci, Tolleson & Tweet, 2025
- Species: †M. olsoni

Binomial name
- †Macadens olsoni Hodnett, Toomey, Sues, Santucci, Tolleson & Tweet, 2025

= Macadens =

Extinct genus of cartilaginous fishes

Macadens is an extinct genus of cartilaginous fish, likely belonging to the subclass Holocephali, discovered in Mammoth Cave National Park, Kentucky. It contains a single known species, Macadens olsoni, known from a fossilized tooth whorl dating to the Late Mississippian subperiod of the Carboniferous period, approximately 340 to 335 million years ago.

== Discovery and research history ==
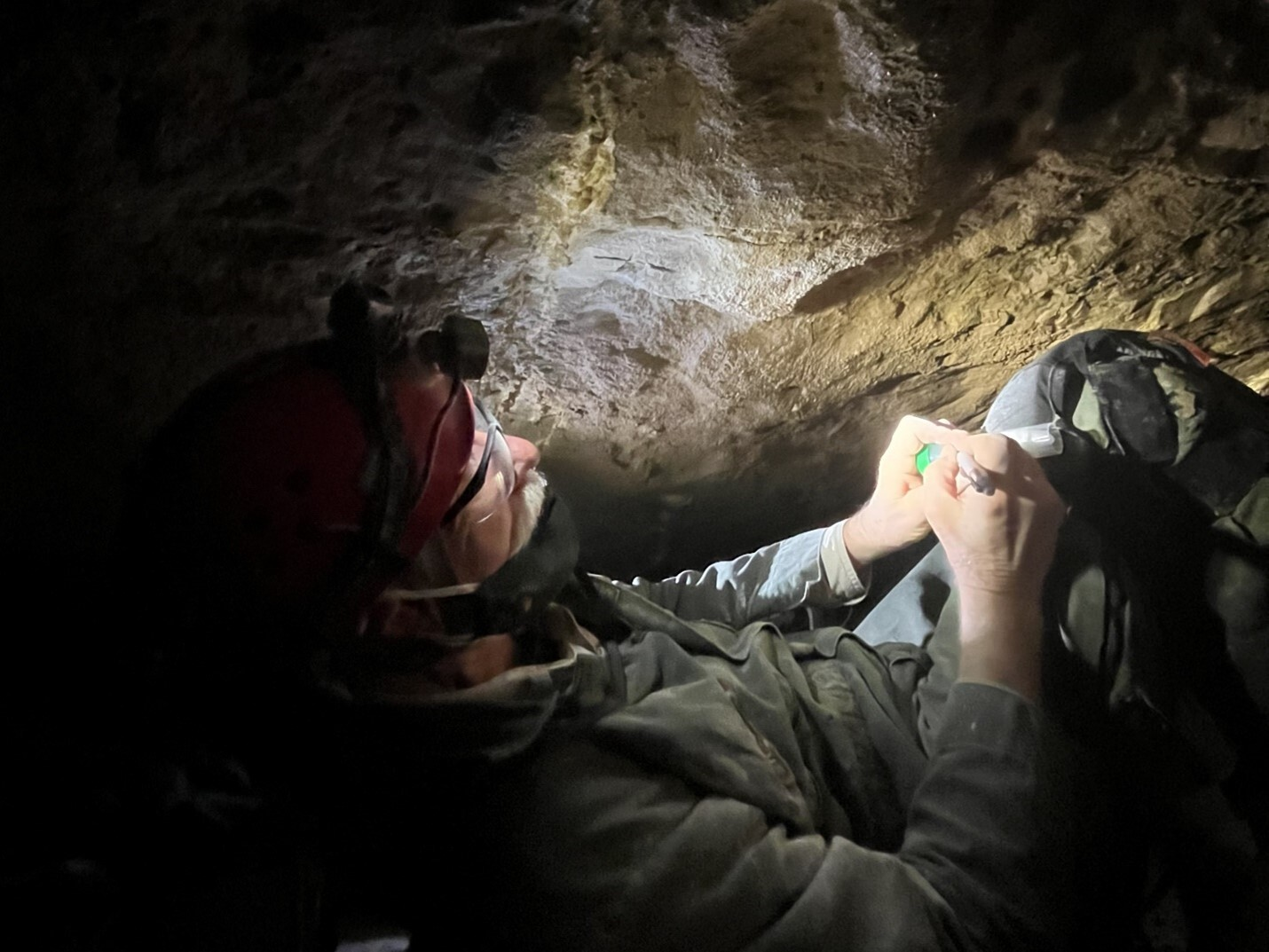
Rickard Olson, after whom the species M. olsoni is named, studying fossils in Mammoth Cave

Fossils of Macadens were first discovered in 2020 within the Ste. Genevieve Formation, a Mississippian-age limestone layer exposed inside Mammoth Cave. The discovery was made during the National Park Service's Paleontological Resource Inventory (PRI), a research initiative launched in 2019 to document fossil material throughout the park. The official announcement was made on July 24, 2025, coinciding with public outreach during "Shark Week". The scientific investigation was conducted by a team from the National Park Service Paleontology Program, and the Smithsonian Institution's Department of Paleobiology. Macadens is the fifth new shark species described from Mammoth Cave National Park since the PRI began.

Researchers plan to publish a more detailed description of Macadens that includes micro-CT imaging of the tooth whorl, detailed morphometric analysis, and 3D reconstruction of its jaw mechanics. Additionally, trace element studies on the fossil's dentine may offer insights into seawater chemistry and paleoecological conditions during the Carboniferous.

=== Naming ===
The genus name Macadens consists of “maca”, a shortening of Mammoth Cave alongside “dens” (meaning “tooth”, since the species is only known from teeth) while the name of the type and only species, M. olsoni, honors Rickard Olson, a former park scientist noted for his decades-long contributions to documenting fossil shark species in the region.

== Description ==
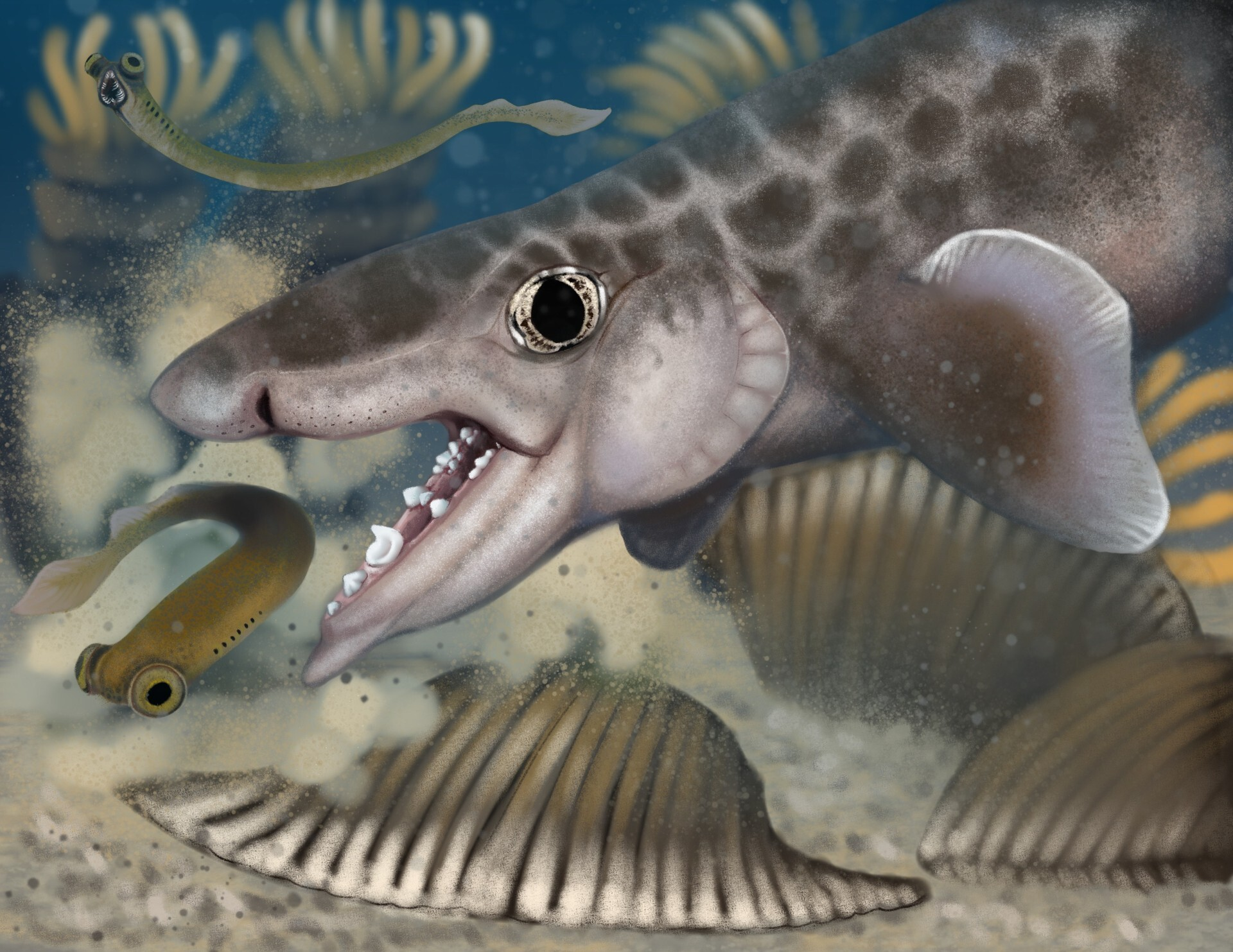
Life restoration

Macadens olsoni was a small, holocephalan cartilaginous fish, estimated to have reached lengths of less than 30 centimeters (12 inches). It is primarily known from fragments of its tooth whorl; a curved, spiral-like dental structure located symphyseally (at the midline of the jaw).

== Classification ==
Although the species is tentatively assigned to the subclass Holocephali, its exact phylogenetic placement remains under study. Like other holocephalans, Macadens likely had a fused upper jaw and specialized crushing dentition, features that support its tentative classification within the group. Macadens is similar to Rotuladens coxanus (formerly Helodus coxanus), another holocephalan described from the same region.

== Paleoecology ==
During the Late Mississippian, between 340 and 335 million years ago, the region now forming central Kentucky was part of a shallow tropical seaway known as the Mississippian Sea, which connected portions of what are now North America, Europe, and North Africa. Macadens fossils were embedded in fine limestone sediment within the Ste. Genevieve Formation, which was in a shallow marine environment during the Mississippian. This formation is a well-known source of fossil crinoids, corals, and other marine invertebrates, indicative of a reef-like habitat. Macadens olsoni inhabited these reefs, preying on small benthic organisms in the warm, nutrient-rich waters. Over 70 species of extinct fish have been identified within Mammoth Cave National Park, more than 40 of which are cartilaginous. These include petalodonts such as Clavusodens and Strigilodus, and the similar Rotuladens.

Macadens displays adaptations suited to durophagy, with blunt, robust teeth suggest that suggest the animal fed on invertebrates such as molluscs and annelid worms.
