= Conchodus =

Conchodus Temporal range: Late Devonian

Scientific classification
- Kingdom: Animalia
- Phylum: Chordata
- Class: Dipnoi
- Family: †Dipteridae
- Genus: †Conchodus; McCoy, 1848

Type species
- †Conchodus ostreaformis McCoy, 1848

Species
- See text

Extinct genus of fishes

Conchodus is an extinct genus of marine lungfish which lived during the Devonian period.

The following species are known:

- †C. elkneri Gorisdro-Kulczycka, 1950 - Late Devonian (Frasnian) of Poland
- †C. excessus Krupina, 1990 - Late Devonian (Famennian) of Oryol, Russia
- †C. jerofejewi (Pander, 1858) - Late Devonian of Leningrad, Russia (=Cheirodus lateralis von Eichwald, 1846)
- †C. ostreaformis McCoy, 1848 (type species) - Devonian of Scotland
- †C. parvulus Bryant ex Bryant & Johnson, 1936 - Famennian of Colorado, USA
- †C. pinguiculus Krupina, 1990 - Devonian of Russia
- †C. variabilis Eastman, 1908 - Late Devonian of Iowa and Missouri, USA

An indeterminate species is known from Latvia. The species C. plicatus Dawson, 1868 of Nova Scotia is now placed in Sagenodus as S. plicatus.
