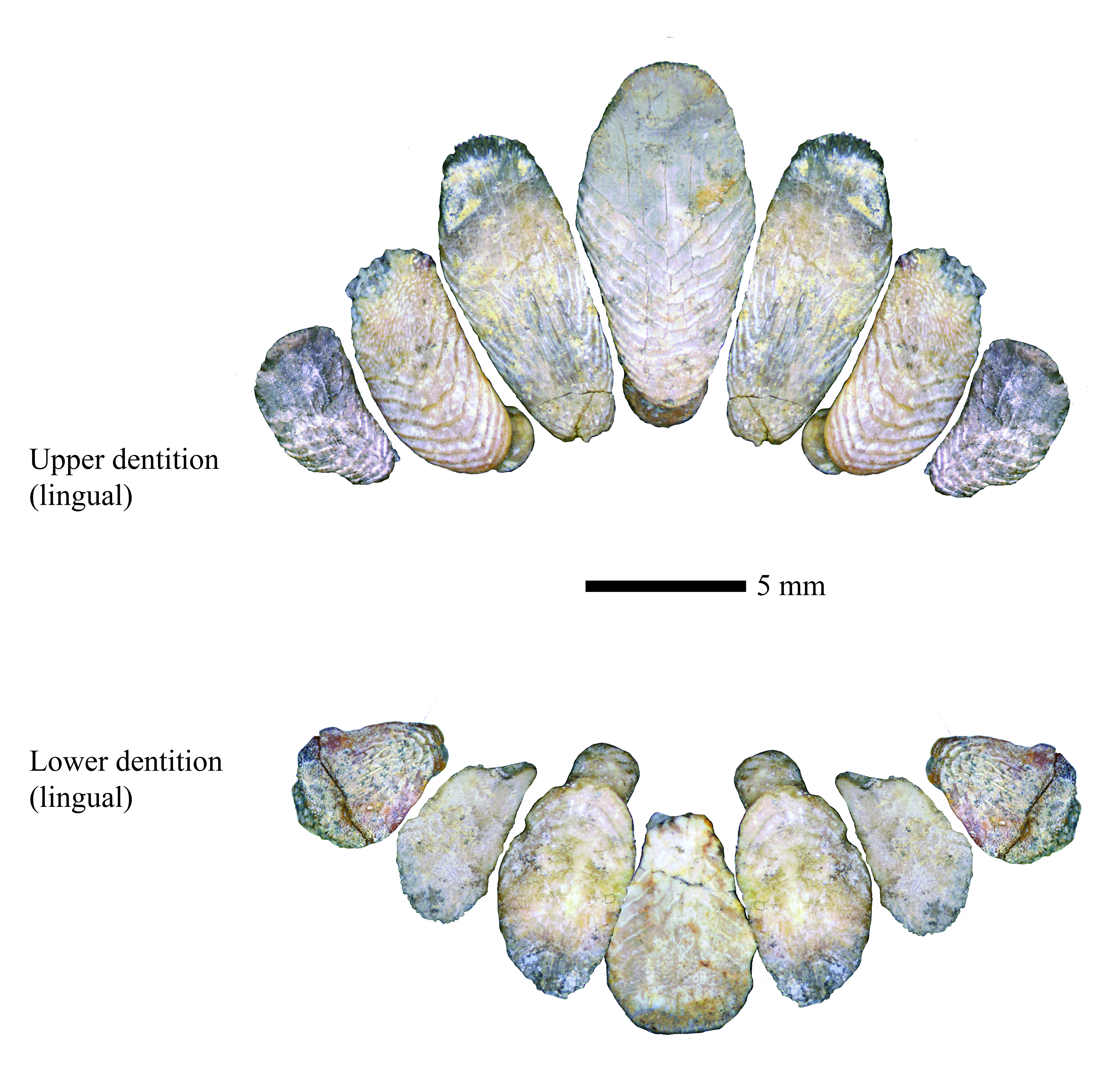
- Tooth arrangement

Scientific classification
- Kingdom: Animalia
- Phylum: Chordata
- Class: Chondrichthyes
- Subclass: Holocephali
- Order: †Petalodontiformes
- Genus: †Strigilodus; Hodnett, Toomey, Olson, Tweet & Santucci, 2023

Species
- Strigilodus tollesonae Hodnett, et al. 2023

= Strigilodus =

Strigilodus Temporal range: Lower Carboniferous

Extinct genus of cartilaginous fishes

Strigilodus is an extinct genus of cartilaginous fish within the order Petalodontiformes. This genus existed during the Lower Carboniferous period, approximately 350 million years ago.

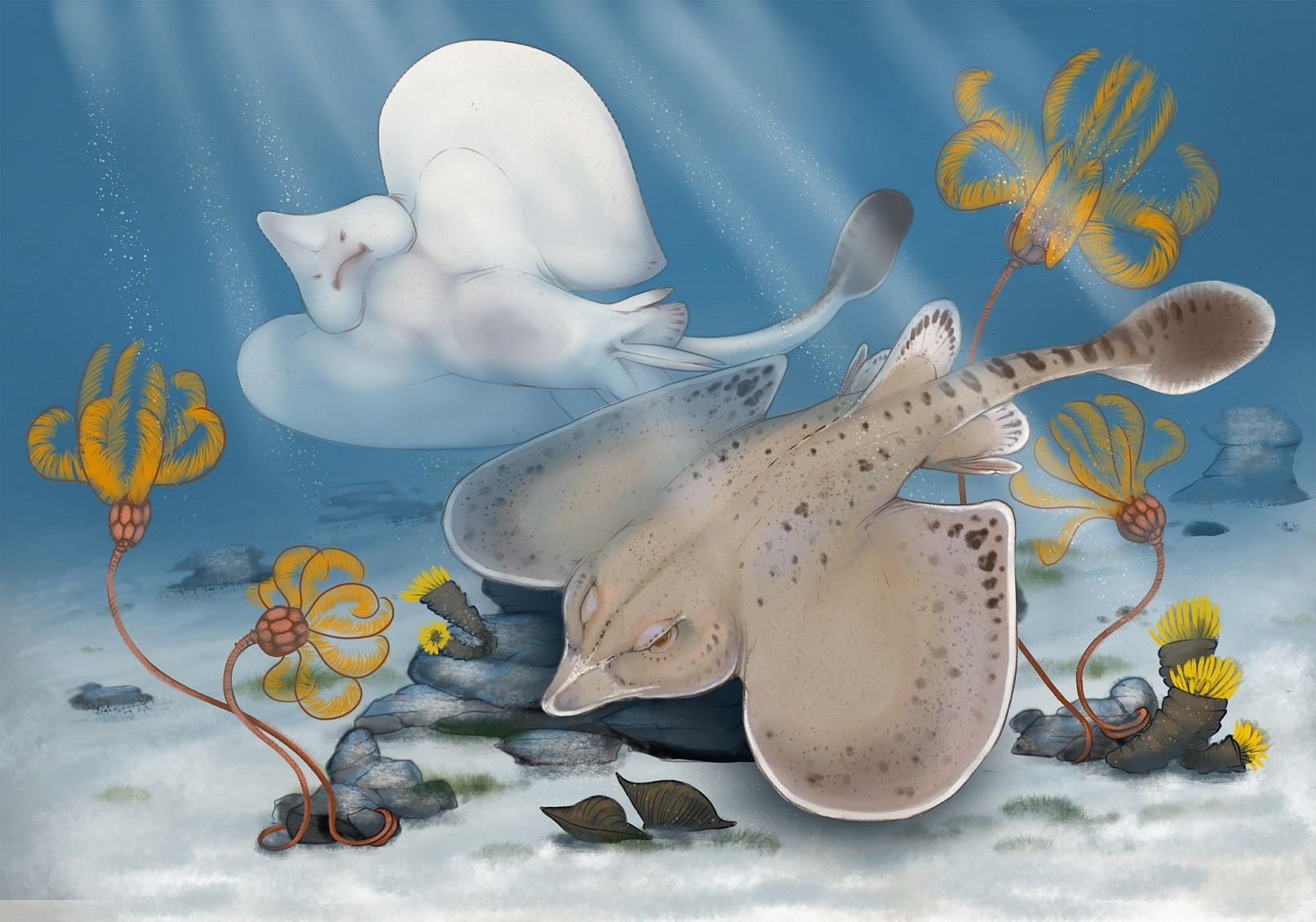
Life restoration

The genus was identified in 2023 from fossilized teeth found in the Ste. Genevieve Formation rock layer at Mammoth Cave National Park in Kentucky, the United States. The distinctive teeth, arranged in a fan-like structure, featured a large tooth in the center and three smaller teeth alongside it. Each tooth had a rounded curved cusp for clipping and grasping hard shell prey, with ridges on the inner side for crushing.

== Species ==
The genus contains 1 known species:

- Strigilodus tollesonae (Hodnett, Toomey, Olson, Tweet & Santucci, 2023)
