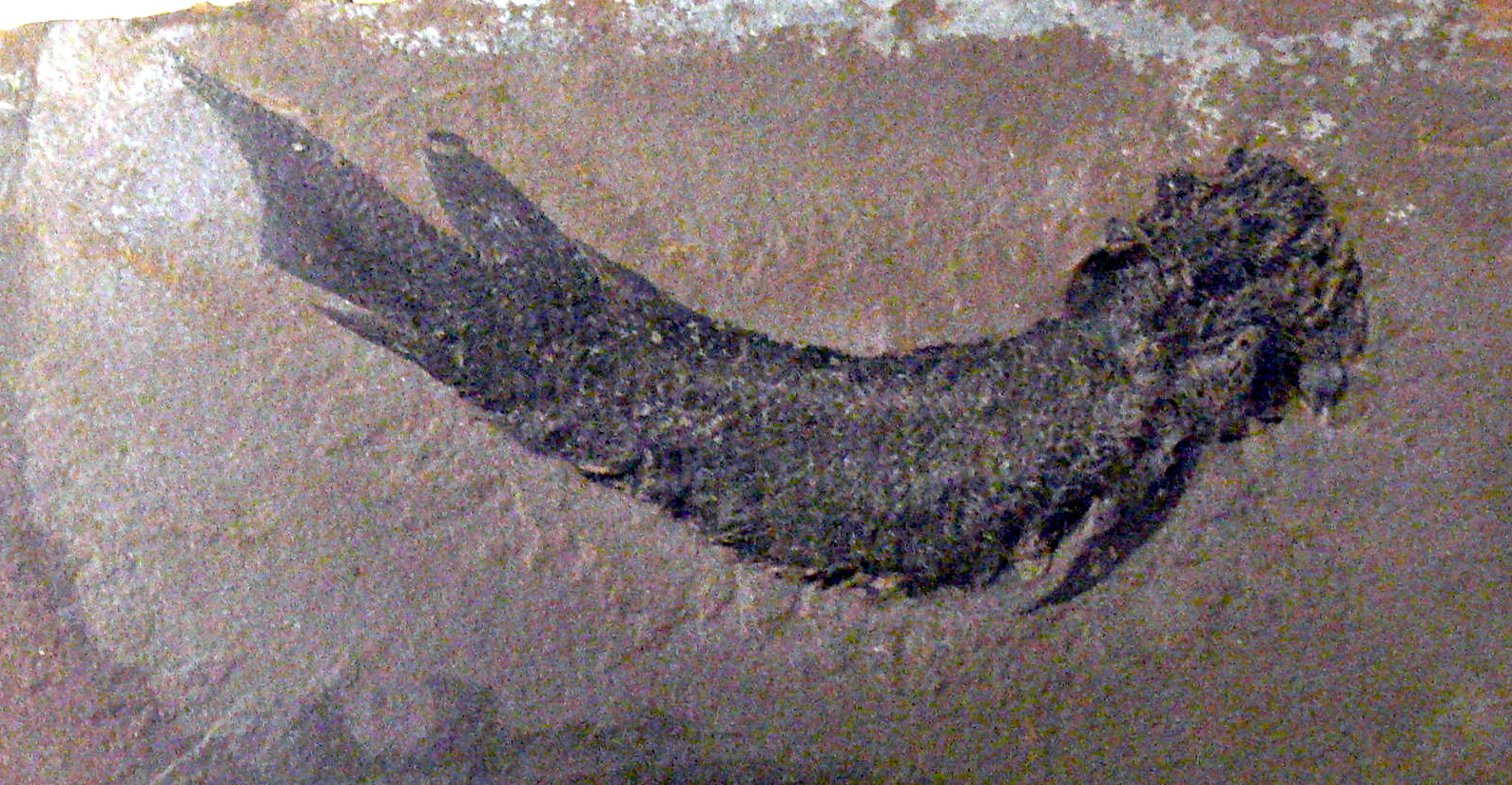
- Fossil of D. valenciennesi from Scotland

Scientific classification
- Kingdom: Animalia
- Phylum: Chordata
- Class: Dipnoi
- Family: †Dipteridae
- Genus: †Dipterus; Sedgwick & Murchison, 1828

Type species
- Dipterus valenciennesi Sedgwick & Murchison, 1828

Other species
- D. contraversus Hay, 1899; D. crassus Gross, 1933; D. macropterus (Traquair, 1888); D. serratus (Eichwald, 1844)

= Dipterus =

Dipterus Temporal range: Devonian, Eifelian–Givetian

Extinct genus of fishes

Dipterus (from Greek: δίς dís, 'two' and Greek: πτερόν pteron 'wing') is an extinct genus of freshwater lungfish from the middle Devonian period of Europe and potentially North America. The genus was established by Adam Sedgwick & Roderick Murchison in the year 1828. It was one of the first lungfish to be described by science.

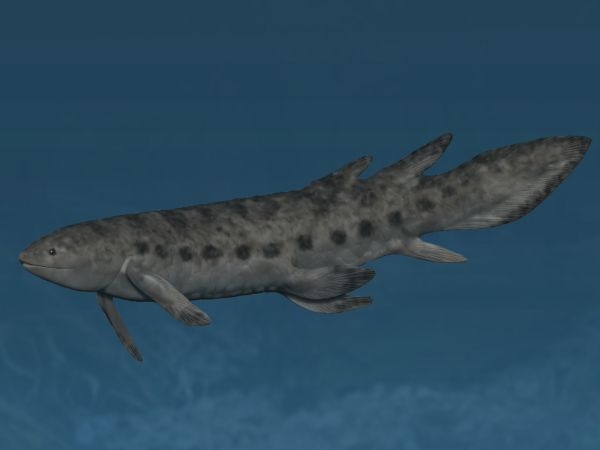
Restoration

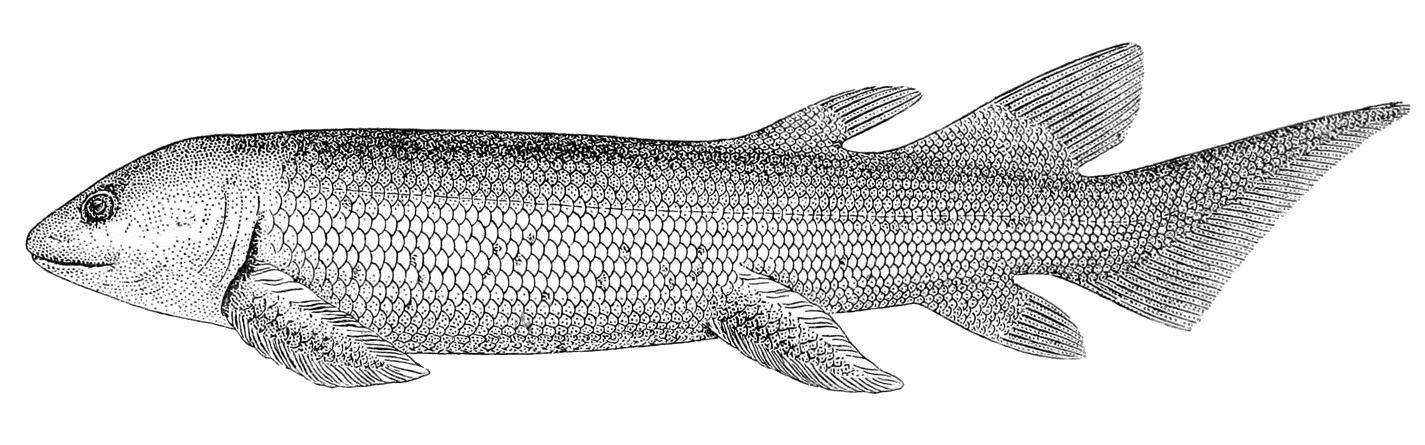
Illustration of Dipterus valenciennesi

In most respects, Dipterus, which was about 35 centimetres (14 in) long, closely resembled modern lungfish. Like its ancestor Dipnorhynchus, it had tooth-like plates on its palate instead of real teeth. However, unlike its modern relatives, in which the dorsal, caudal, and anal fin are fused into one, Dipterus's fins were still separated.

The following species are known:

- D. macropterus Traquair, 1888 - Lower Old Red Sandstone of Scotland
- ?D. marginalis (Agassiz, 1845) - Devonian of Leningrad Oblast, Russia
- ?D. radiatus (Eichwald, 1844) - Devonian of Leningrad Oblast, Russia
- ?D. serratus (Eichwald, 1844) - Eifelian of Latvia, Estonia, and Leningrad, Russia
- D. valenciennesi Sedgwick & Murchison, 1828 (type species) - Caithness Flagstone of Scotland, including the Orkney Isles, potentially Oberer Plattenkalk of Germany

Many other species from Europe and North America have also been described based on isolated tooth plates, though due to their fragmentary nature, their exact taxonomic affinity is uncertain.
