= Amadeodipterus =

Amadeodipterus Temporal range: Devonian

Scientific classification
- Kingdom: Animalia
- Phylum: Chordata
- Class: Dipnoi
- Family: †Dipteridae
- Genus: †Amadeodipterus; Young & Schultze, 2005
- Species: †A. kencampbelli

Binomial name
- †Amadeodipterus kencampbelli Young & Schultze, 2005

Extinct genus of fishes

Amadeodipterus is an extinct genus of lungfish which lived during the Devonian period. Fossils have been found in Central Australia.
