= Vanneaugobius =

Scientific classification
- Domain: Eukaryota
- Kingdom: Animalia
- Phylum: Chordata
- Class: Actinopterygii
- Order: Gobiiformes
- Family: Gobiidae
- Genus: Vanneaugobius; Brownell, 1978

Type species
- Vanneaugobius dollfusi Brownell, 1978

Genus of fishes

Vanneaugobius is a genus of gobies native to the eastern Atlantic Ocean and the Mediterranean Sea.

== Species ==
There are currently three recognized species in this genus:

- Vanneaugobius canariensis Van Tassell, P. J. Miller & Brito, 1988
- Vanneaugobius dollfusi Brownell, 1978
- Vanneaugobius pruvoti (Fage, 1907)
