= Karpov Yar Locality =

- Stratigraphic range: Middle Miocene; 12.82–11.8 Ma
- Type: Site
- Overlies: Cretaceous conglomerate and chert

Lithology
- Primary: Clay, Marl, Diatomite

Location
- Country: Moldova

Type section
- Named for: Karpov Yar

The Karpov Yar Locality is a paleontological site located in northern Moldova dating to the Middle Miocene. These layers contain a number of fish specimens with a different faunal composition to similar sites in the region. Unlike in other localities, clupeids are the most common fish group with more benthic fish also making up a large amount of the biota. Similar to other sites in the region, the Karpov Yar Locality represents an ecosystem within the Eastern Paratethys which would have been largely separated from the rest of the inland sea at the time of preservation.

== Description ==
The Karpov Yar Locality is located in northern Moldova near the township of Naslavcea, specifically within a nearby ravine. It is largely made up of layers of marls and diatomites with the base of the site being made up of clays. The locality unconformably overlies conglomerates and cherts that have been dated to the Upper Cretaceous. The fish specimens found at the locality are found throughout the more marine sediments while only leaf fossils are found at the base.

=== Comparisons with other biotas ===
The ichthyofauna of the Karpov Yar Locality is different from other localities in the region due to the fact that clupeids are not the dominant fish family at the site, rather being atherinids. Even with this being the case, clupeids are common though not as common as gobies. The only site from a similar time and region is the Tsurevsky assemblage in Russia with a very different fauna that only shares a few genera with the Karpov Yar Locality. Benthic fish are also much more common at Karpov Yar, especially with gobies. It has been suggested that this large difference in fauna is due to an interrupted connection between the basin.

== Paleobiota ==
=== Acanthuriformes ===
Acanthuriformes of the Karpov Yar Locality
Genus	Species	Notes	Image
Morone	M. ionkoi	A moronid known from four specimens with a standard length of about 3.3 centimetres (1.3 in).	
Naslavcea	N. fundata	A sparid known from four specimens with a standard length of 4.5 centimetres (1.8 in). The fish was originally assigned to the genus Spicara though was later reassigned.	
Sparus	S. brusinai	A sparid known from a total of thirty specimens with a standard length of 12 centimetres (4.7 in).	

=== Amphibia ===
Amphibians of the Karpov Yar Locality
Genus	Species	Notes	Image
Pelobatidae gen. indet.		Two specimens belonging to members of the family Pelobatidae with a body length of 4.0–4.5 centimetres (1.6–1.8 in). This was the first described Miocene member of the family from Moldova.	

=== Atheriniformes ===
Atheriniformes of the Karpov Yar Locality
Genus	Species	Notes	Image
Atherina	A. suchovi	An atherinid known from a total of 73 specimens with a standard length of 5.0 centimetres (2.0 in).	

=== Blenniiformes ===
Blenniiformes of the Karpov Yar Locality
Genus	Species	Notes	Image
Clinitrachoides	C. gratus	A clinid known from eleven specimens with a standard length of 3.25 centimetres (1.28 in).	

=== Carangiformes ===
Carangiformes of the Karpov Yar Locality
Genus	Species	Notes	Image
Lates	L. gregarius	A latid known from two specimens with a standard length of around 8.0 centimetres (3.1 in).	
Polydactylus	P. frivolus	A polynemid known from five specimens with a standard length of 7.0 centimetres (2.8 in). Compared to the living species, P. frivolus had one more trunk vertebrae and less pectoral fin rays.	

=== Clupeiformes ===
Clupeiformes of the Karpov Yar Locality
Genus	Species	Notes	Image
Moldavichthys	M. switshenskae	A clupeid originally described as the genera Clupea and Clupeonella represented by a total of thirty specimens. The standard length of the fish is 7.0 centimetres (2.8 in).	

=== Cyprinodontiformes ===
Cyprinodontiformes of the Karpov Yar Locality
Genus	Species	Notes	Image
Prolebias	'P'. sp.	A cyprinodontid mentioned to have bee found at the locality but not described.	

=== Gobiiformes ===
Gobiiformes of the Karpov Yar Locality
Genus	Species	Notes	Image
Alienagobius	A. pygmaeus	A small oxudercid known from three specimens with standard length of the fish is 2.01 centimetres (0.79 in).	
Cryptograciles	C. conicus	A small oxudercid known from two specimens with standard length of the fish is 2.55 centimetres (1.00 in).	
Cryptograciles	C. robustus	A small oxudercid known from two specimens with a standard length of 2.05 centimetres (0.81 in).	
Katyagobius	K. prikryli	A small gobiid known from a single specimen with a standard length of 3.10 centimetres (1.22 in).	
Katyagobius	K. sp.	A small gobiid known from two specimens with a standard length of 3.62 centimetres (1.43 in). Due to differences between the two specimens, it is unknown if the material represents one or two species.	
Moldavigobius	M. gloriae	A small gobiid known from a single specimen with a standard length of the fish is 3.35 centimetres (1.32 in).	
Moldavigobius	M. helenae	A small gobiid known from six specimens with a standard length of the fish is 3.42 centimetres (1.35 in).	
Moldavigobius	M. sp	A small gobiid known from a single specimen that cannot be placed to species level though is notably different than the described species due to a few traits including the amount of rays on the second dorsal fin and the larger size of some of the scales. The standard length of the fish is 3.44 centimetres (1.35 in).	
Pseudolesueurigobius	P. manfredi	A medium-sized gobiid known from two specimens with a standard length of 6.50 centimetres (2.56 in).	
Sarmatigobius	S. compactus	A medium-sized gobiid known from a single specimen with a standard length of 5.39 centimetres (2.12 in).	
Sarmatigobius	S. iugosus	A medium-sized gobiid known from a single specimen with a standard length of 6.4 centimetres (2.5 in). The otoliths preserved with the fish were originally described as a species of the genus Hesperichthys.	
Yarigobius	Y. decoratus	A medium-sized gobiid known from a single specimen with a standard length of 6.32 centimetres (2.49 in).	
Yarigobius	Y. naslavcensis	A small gobiid known from a single specimen with a standard length of the fish is 3.87 centimetres (1.52 in).	

=== Labriformes ===
Labriformes of the Karpov Yar Locality
Genus	Species	Notes	Image
Symphodus	S. salvus	A labrid known from a single specimen with a standard length of 6.0 centimetres (2.4 in).	

=== Mugiliformes ===
Mugiliformes of the Karpov Yar Locality
Genus	Species	Notes	Image
Mugil	M. acer	A mugilid known from eighteen specimens with a standard length of 18.3 centimetres (7.2 in).	

=== Perciformes ===
Perciformes of the Karpov Yar Locality
Genus	Species	Notes	Image
Scorpaena	'S'. sp.	A scorpaenid mentioned to have bee found at the locality but not described.	

=== Syngnathiformes ===
Syngnathiformes of the Karpov Yar Locality
Genus	Species	Notes	Image
Mullus	M. moldavicus	A mullid known from five specimens with a standard length of the fish is 7.7 centimetres (3.0 in).	
Nerophis	N. zapfei	A syngnathid with one specimen found at the locality with a standard length of 9.8 centimetres (3.9 in). The species was originally found in Austria, suggesting a link between the eastern and central Paratethys basins during this time.	

=== Mollusca ===
Mollusks of the Karpov Yar Locality
Genus	Species	Notes	Image
Clavatula	C. doderleini	A turrid that is found at multiple localities throughout the Eastern Paratethys.	
Loripes	L. niveus	A lucinid associated with the transgression of the Central and Eastern Paratethys that has been found in brackish marshes.	
Terebralia	T. lignitarum	A potamidid found throughout the Paratethys that preferred more brackish environments.	
Tritonalia	T. striata	A muricid associated with the transgression of the Central and Eastern Paratethys.	

== Paleoenvironment ==
The environment preserved by the base of the Karpov Yar Locality was a coastal swamp with all fish specimens found in layers representing that of coastal lagoons within the Eastern Paratethys. During this time, the Eastern Paratethys was largely closed off from the rest of the inland sea.
