= Oligodiodon =

Scientific classification
- Kingdom: Animalia
- Phylum: Chordata
- Class: Actinopterygii
- Order: Tetraodontiformes
- Genus: †Oligodiodon; Tavani, 1955

Extinct genus of fishes

Oligodiodon (meaning "Oligocene Diodon") is an extinct genus of prehistoric ray-finned fish.

== See also ==
- Prehistoric fish
- List of prehistoric bony fish
