= Clavusodens =

Clavusodens Temporal range: Visean

Scientific classification
- Kingdom: Animalia
- Phylum: Chordata
- Class: Chondrichthyes
- Subclass: Holocephali
- Order: †Petalodontiformes
- Family: †Obruchevodidae
- Genus: †Clavusodens
- Species: †C. mcginnisi

Binomial name
- †Clavusodens mcginnisi Hodnett et al., 2025

Extinct genus of cartilaginous fishes

Clavusodens is an extinct genus of obruchevodid petalodont that lived during the Viséan stage.

== Distribution ==
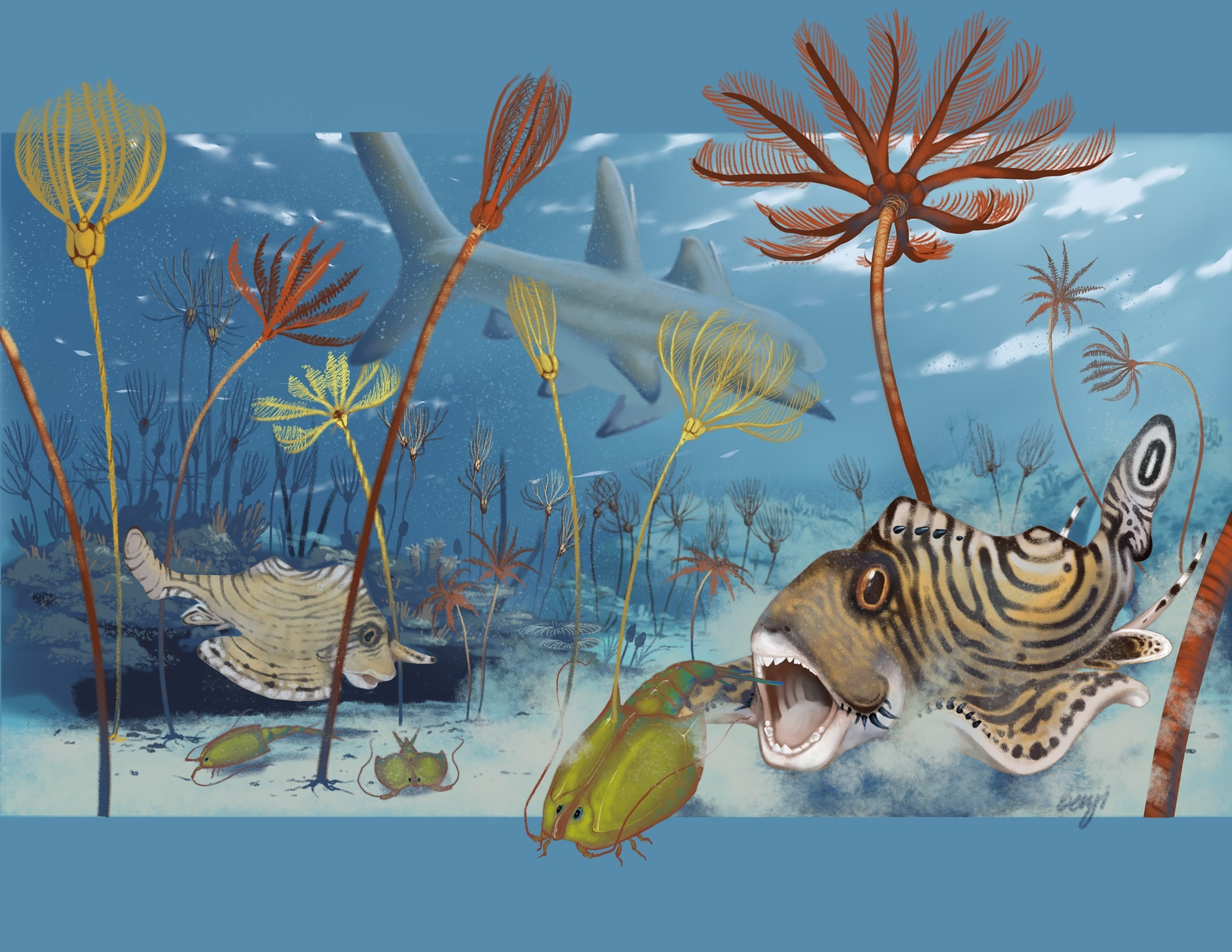
Life restoration

Clavusodens mcginnisi was found in the Ste. Genevieve Formation in Mammoth Cave National Park in Kentucky.
