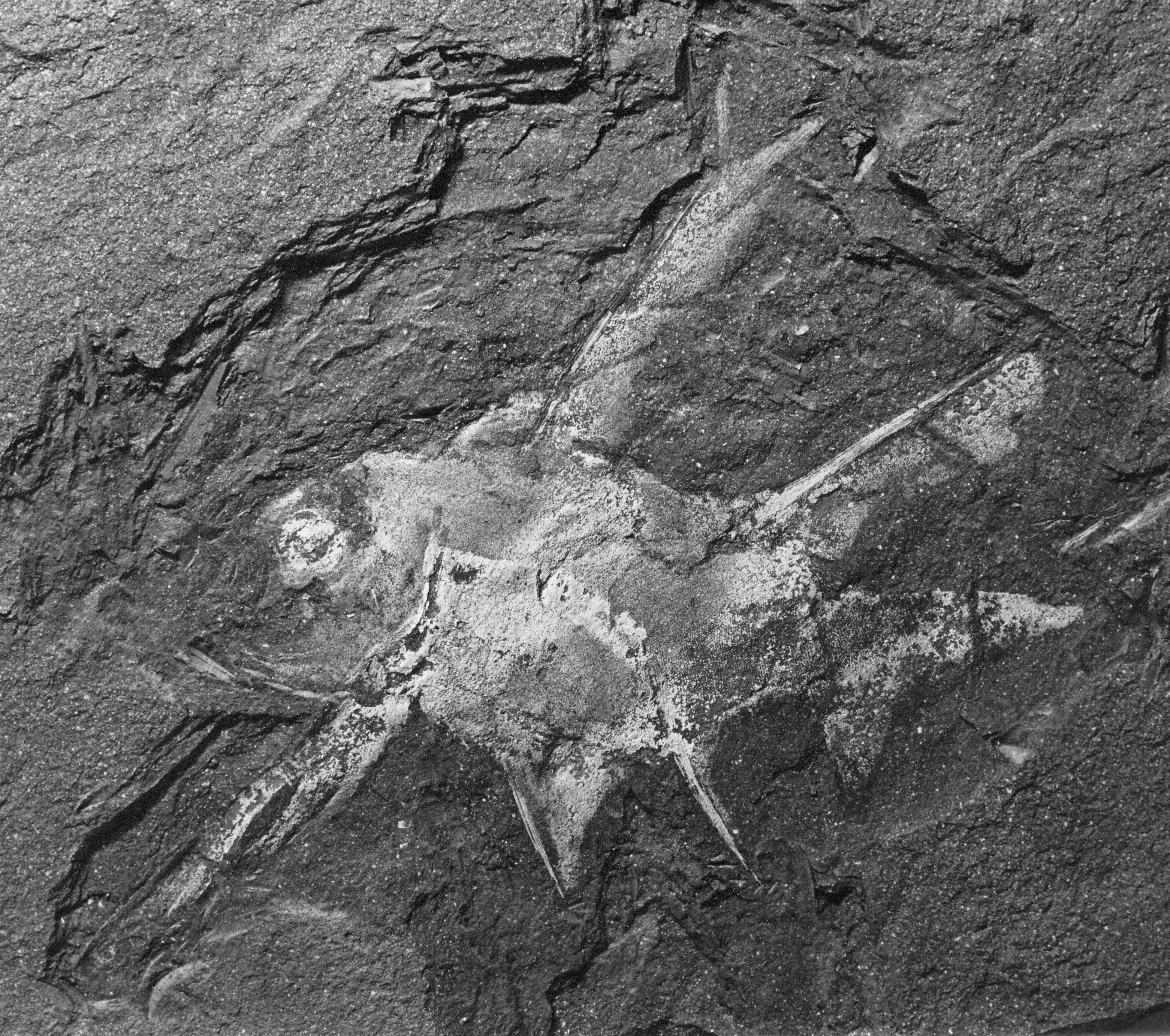
- Fossil of Angelacanthus
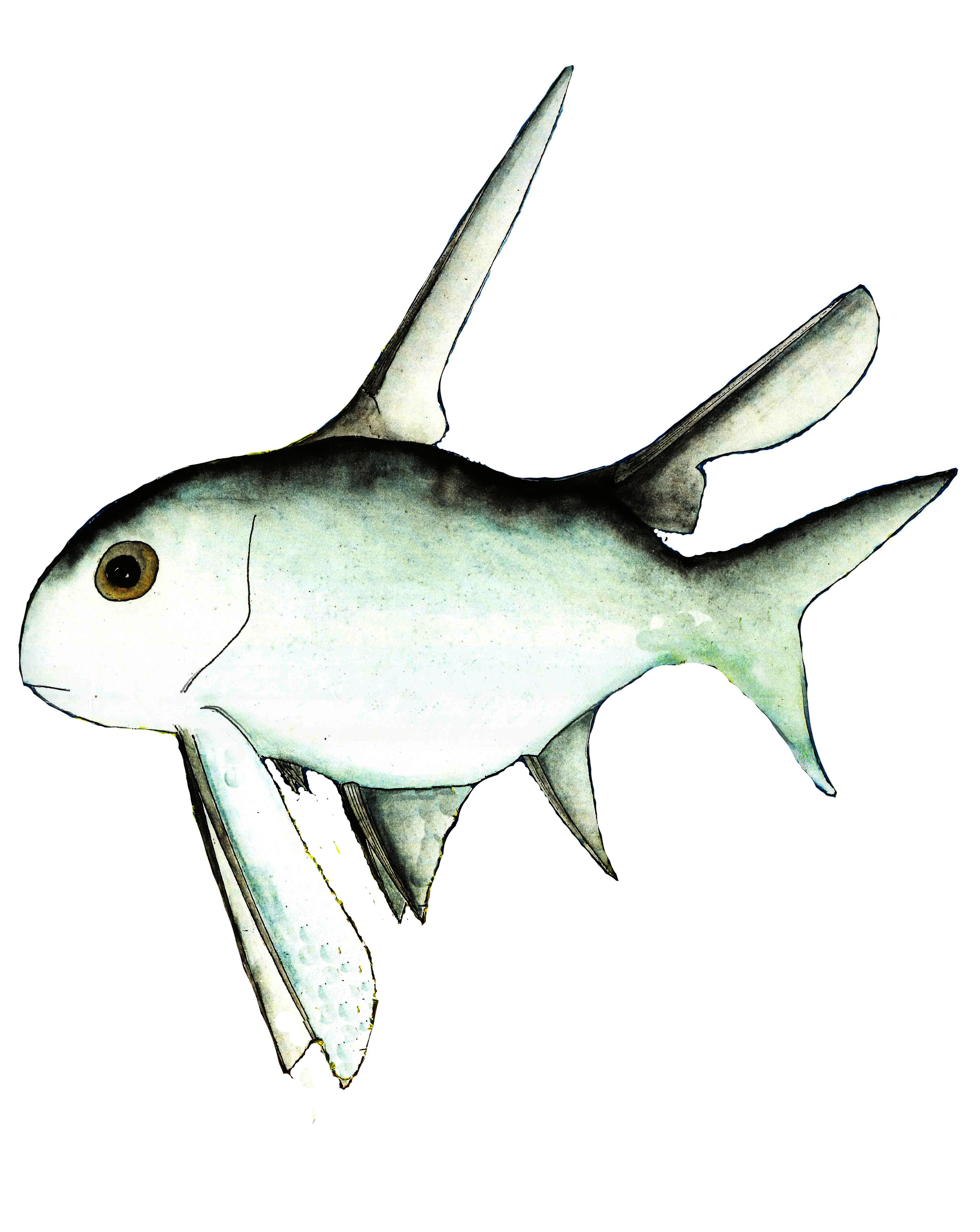
- Life restoration

Scientific classification
- Kingdom: Animalia
- Phylum: Chordata
- Class: Chondrichthyes
- Subclass: †Acanthodii
- Order: †Diplacanthiformes
- Family: †Diplacanthidae
- Genus: †Angelacanthus; Gess and Burrow, 2025
- Species: †A. acus

Binomial name
- †Angelacanthus acus (Gess, 2001)

Synonyms
- Diplacanthus acus Gess, 2001

= Angelacanthus =

Angelacanthus Temporal range: Famennian

Extinct genus of Devonian spiny sharks

Angelacanthus acus (synonym Diplacanthus acus) is a species of Devonian acanthodian from the Waterloo Farm lagerstätte in South Africa. It is the only species in the genus Angelacanthus.

== Description ==
Angelacanthus was described from a near complete whole-bodied impression discovered in 1999 during roadworks cutting the Waterloo Farm lagerstätte. The type specimen of Angelacanthus is approximately 100 mm long and has exceptionally long and thin ribbed spines. The intermediate spines are, conversely, extremely reduced. Unusually it preserves complete outlines of many of the fins.
