= Protorhamphosus =

Protorhamphosus Temporal range: Thanetian

Scientific classification
- Domain: Eukaryota
- Kingdom: Animalia
- Phylum: Chordata
- Class: Actinopterygii
- Order: Gasterosteiformes
- Genus: †Protorhamphosus; Daniltshenko 1968

Genus of fishes

Protorhamphosus is an extinct genus of prehistoric bony fish that lived during the Thanetian stage of the Paleocene epoch.
