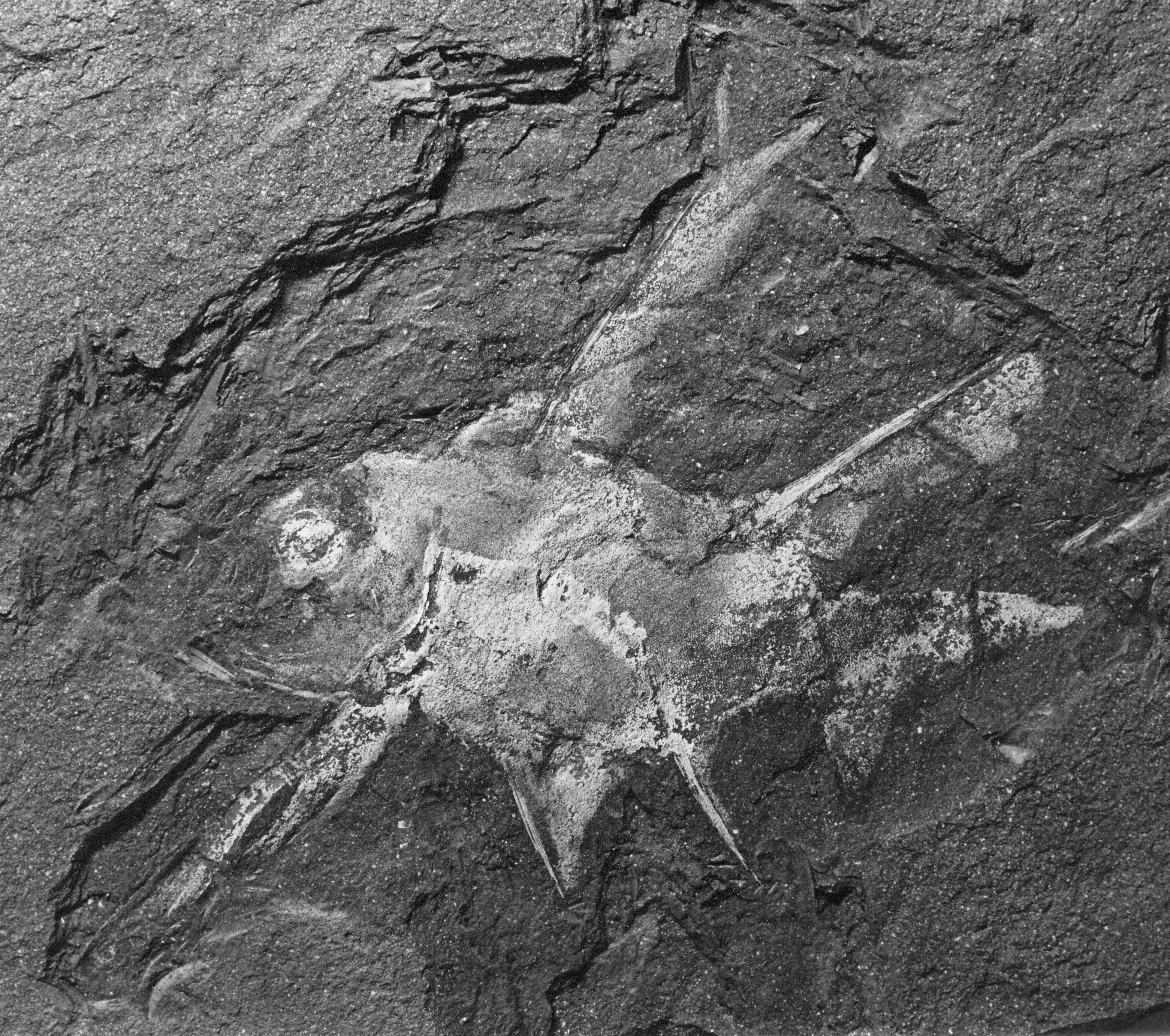
- Angelacanthus acus

Scientific classification
- Kingdom: Animalia
- Phylum: Chordata
- Class: Chondrichthyes
- Subclass: †Acanthodii
- Order: †Diplacanthiformes; Berg, 1940

Subgroups
- see text

= Diplacanthiformes =

Diplacanthiformes Temporal range: Devonian

Extinct order of cartilaginous fishes

Diplacanthiformes (also known as Diplacanthida, Diplacanthoidei, or Diplacanthini) is an order of "acanthodian" stem-chondrichthyans which lived during the Devonian Period.

== Subtaxa ==
- incertae sedis
  - Genus Bryantonchus
  - Genus Culmacanthus
  - Genus Devononchus
  - Genus Striacanthus
  - Genus Tetanopsyrus
- Family Diplacanthidae
  - Genus Angelacanthus
  - Genus Diplacanthus
  - Genus Milesacanthus
  - Genus Ptychodictyon
  - Genus Rhadinacanthus
- Family Gladiobranchidae?
  - Genus Gladiobranchus
  - Genus Uraniacanthus?
