= Phosphichthys =

Phosphichthys Temporal range: Lower Eocene

Scientific classification
- Domain: Eukaryota
- Kingdom: Animalia
- Phylum: Chordata
- Class: Actinopterygii
- Order: Perciformes
- Genus: †Phosphichthys; Arambourg, 1952

Extinct genus of fishes

Phosphichthys is an extinct genus of prehistoric bony fish that lived during the lower Eocene.

== See also ==
- Prehistoric fish
- List of prehistoric bony fish
