= Batillodus =

Batillodus Temporal range: Kasimovian

Scientific classification
- Kingdom: Animalia
- Phylum: Chordata
- Class: Chondrichthyes
- Subclass: Holocephali
- Order: †Petalodontiformes
- Family: †Janassidae
- Genus: †Batillodus
- Species: †B. beaveri

Binomial name
- †Batillodus beaveri Duffin et al., 2025

Extinct genus of cartilaginous fishes

Batillodus is an extinct genus of janassid chondrichthyan that lived during the Kasimovian.

== Distribution ==
Fossils of B. beaveri have been found in Kansas.
