= Dipteridae =

Dipteridae Temporal range: Devonian

Scientific classification
- Kingdom: Animalia
- Phylum: Chordata
- Class: Dipnoi
- Family: †Dipteridae; Owen, 1846

Genera
- †Amadeodipterus; †Conchodus; †Dipterus

Extinct family of fishes

Dipteridae is an extinct family of prehistoric lungfishes which lived in the Devonian period.

== Phylogeny ==
- Sarcopterygii
  - Dipnoi
    - Dipteridae
      - Amadeodipterus
      - Conchodus
      - Dipterus
