= Coquandon =

Coquandon Temporal range: Coniacian

Scientific classification
- Kingdom: Animalia
- Phylum: Chordata
- Class: Chondrichthyes
- Subclass: Elasmobranchii
- Superorder: ?Galeomorphi
- Genus: †Coquandon Greenfield, 2025

Type species
- †Coquandon condamyi (Coquand, 1859)

Synonyms
- Genus synonymy: Orthodon Coquand, 1859 (preoccupied by Orthodon Girard, 1856); Species synonymy: Orthodon condamyi Coquand, 1859; Scylliodus condamyi (Coquand, 1859)

Extinct genus of sharks

Coquandon is an extinct genus of sharks that lived during the Late Cretaceous. It contains one species, C. condamyi, which has been found in France.

== Taxonomy ==
Orthodon condamyi was named by Henri Coquand in 1859 for a tooth from the Cognac locality in France. The holotype is not among Coquand's collection at the Hungarian Natural History Museum and may have been destroyed during the Hungarian Revolution of 1956. The original genus name was preoccupied by the cypriniform Orthodon and was replaced by Coquandon in 2025.

In 1889, Arthur S. Woodward suggested that the species could belong to Scyllium. Errol I. White and James A. Moy-Thomas proposed that it might be a member of Scyliorhinus in 1941. In 1967, Henry W. Fowler reassigned the species to Scylliodus. However, the reported size and morphology of the holotype is more consistent with a larger lamniform than a carcharhiniform.
