= Tongdulepis =

Tongdulepis Temporal range: Eifelian

Scientific classification
- Kingdom: Animalia
- Phylum: Chordata
- Class: †Placodermi
- Order: †Antiarchi
- Family: †Tubalepididae
- Genus: †Tongdulepis
- Species: †T. concavus

Binomial name
- †Tongdulepis concavus Luo et al., 2025

Extinct genus of fishes

Tongdulepis is an extinct genus of tubalepid antiarch that lived during the Eifelian stage of the Middle Devonian epoch.

== Distribution ==
Tongdulepis concavus fossils are known from the Qujing Formation of Huize County in northwestern Yunnan. The holotype was discovered in 2021.
