= Heckelodes =

Heckelodes Temporal range: Rupelian

Scientific classification
- Kingdom: Animalia
- Phylum: Chordata
- Class: Chondrichthyes
- Subclass: Elasmobranchii
- Superorder: ?Galeomorphi
- Genus: †Heckelodes Greenfield, 2025

Type species
- †Heckelodes priscus (Heckel, 1854)

Synonyms
- Genus synonymy: Galeodes Heckel, 1854 (preoccupied by Galeodes Olivier, 1792); Species synonymy: Galeodes priscus Heckel, 1854; Galeocerdo priscus (Heckel, 1854)

Extinct genus of sharks

Heckelodes is an extinct genus of sharks that lived during the early Oligocene. It contains one species, H. priscus, which has been found in Italy.

== Taxonomy ==
Galeodes priscus was named by Johann J. Heckel in 1854 for a skin impression (containing dermal denticles) from the Chiavon locality in Italy. The holotype is located at the Museo Civico di Storia Naturale, Verona. The original genus name was preoccupied by the solifugid Galeodes and was replaced by Heckelodes in 2025.

In 1889, Francesco Bassani reassigned the species to Galeocerdo and referred 2 teeth and 13 vertebrae from the same locality. That synonymy was accepted by other researchers like Arthur S. Woodward, Errol I. White and James A. Moy-Thomas, and Henry W. Fowler. However, this material has no overlap and is possibly chimaeric; one tooth is similar to Physogaleus and the vertebrae could be from a lamniform. H. priscus cannot be identified as a species of Galeocerdo based on its holotype.
