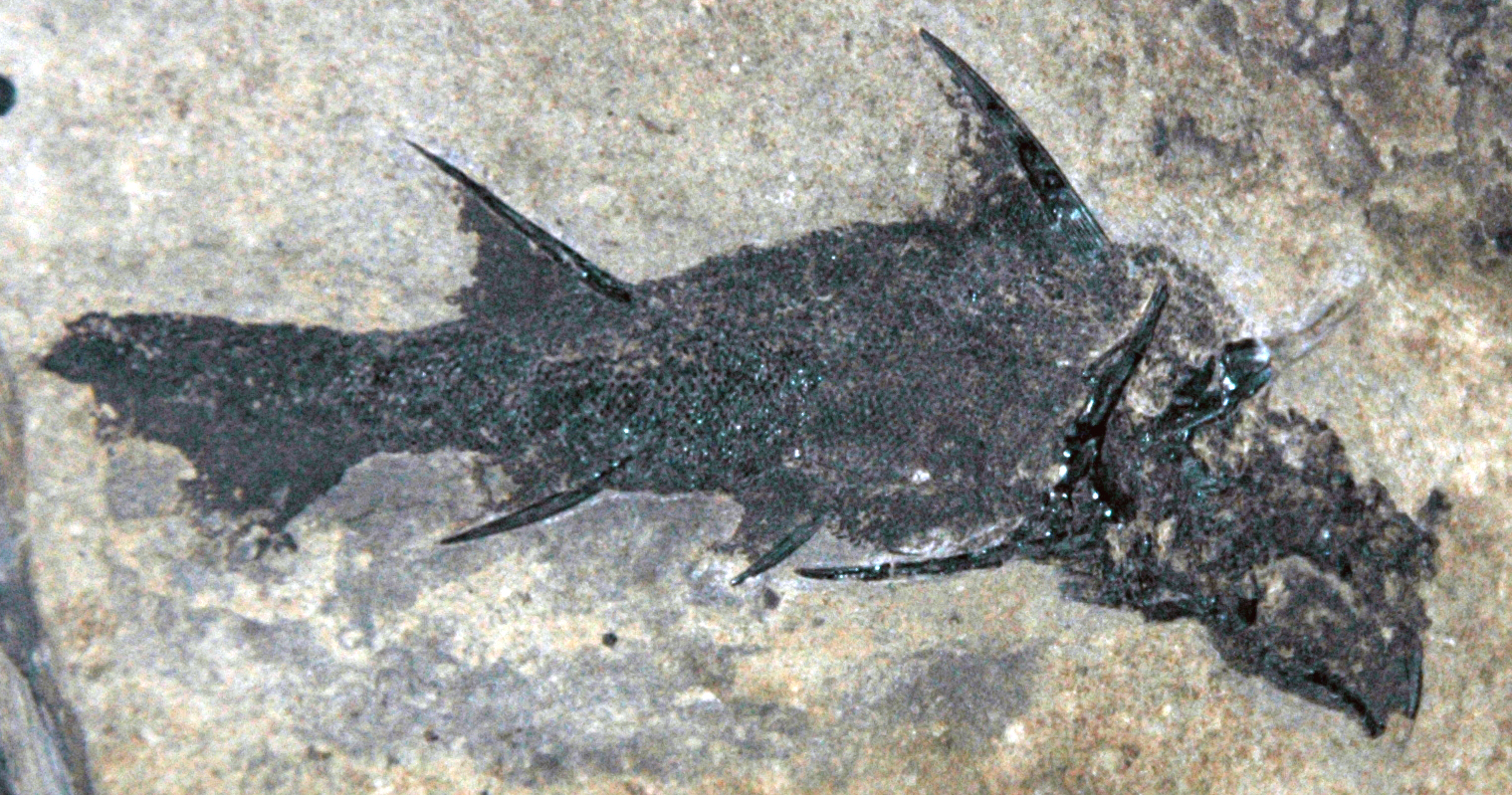
- Fossil specimen of D. crassissimus (=D. striatus)
- Life restoration

Scientific classification
- Kingdom: Animalia
- Phylum: Chordata
- Class: Chondrichthyes
- Subclass: †Acanthodii
- Order: †Diplacanthiformes
- Family: †Diplacanthidae
- Genus: †Diplacanthus; Agassiz, 1843

Species
- see text

= Diplacanthus =

Diplacanthus Temporal range: Eifelian–Famennian

Extinct genus of Devonian spiny sharks

Diplacanthus is an extinct genus of Mid to Late Devonian fish in the class Acanthodii, known as spiny sharks. Diplacanthus can be translated to ‘’double spine’’, in reference to the two dorsal fin spines of the fish.

== Classification ==
The genus was named by Louis Agassiz in 1843. It was formerly regarded as belonging to the Climatiformes but recently reassigned to the Diplacanthiformes, in which it is united with, amongst others, Rhadinacanthus, Uraniacanthus, and Culmacanthus. Diplacanthiforms were widespread during the Middle and early Late Devonian. They are best represented in the Middle Devonian, by articulated fossils, fin spines, and abundant scales, the latter particularly from northern Europe.

In a latest revision of the genus Diplacanthus, a large number of species from Europe were synonymized with earlier Scottish species, and these too were redefined. D. crassisimus was taken to have precedence over D. striatus as the name of the type specimen. Diplacanthus longispinus was reassigned to Rhadinacanthus longispinus, within which were also included Diplacanthus horridus (Woodward, 1892) and Diplacanthus ellsi. Diplacanthus tenuistriatus and Diplacanthus kleesmentae were however retained. Non-Laurussian species such as Diplacanthus acus from South Africa were not considered in this review.

In a 2025 paper, the species D. acus was reassigned to the new genus Angelacanthus.

=== Species ===
- †D. crassisimus Duff, 1842 (type species)
- †D. gravis? Valiukevičius, 1986
- †D. kleesmentae? Valiukevičius, 1988
- †D. poltnigi? Valiukevičius, 2003
- †D. solidus? Valiukevičius, 1986
- †D. tenuistriatus Traquair, 1844

Diplacanthus is most commonly associated with deposits traditionally interpreted as fresh water. However, Waterloo Farm is interpreted as estuarine in origin, as is the Canadian Miguashaia lagerstätte from which two species of Diplacanthus have been described. The description of Angelacanthus acus provided the first record of a diplacanthid from the Famennian, with diplacanthids having previously been thought to have gone extinct by the end of the Frasnian.
