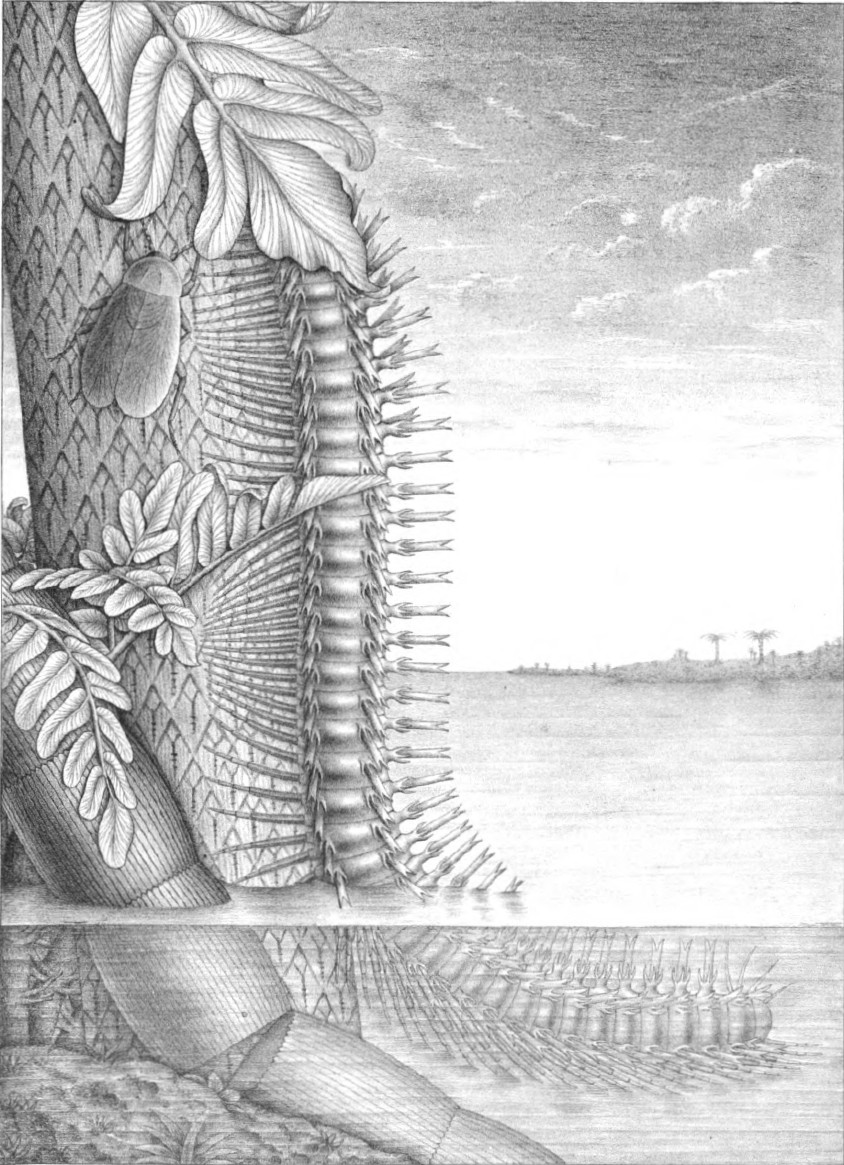
- Reconstruction of Acantherpestes major

Scientific classification
- Kingdom: Animalia
- Phylum: Arthropoda
- Subphylum: Myriapoda
- Class: Diplopoda
- Subclass: Chilognatha
- Superorder: †Archipolypoda; Scudder, 1882

Orders
- Archidesmida; Cowiedesmida; Euphoberiida; Palaeosomatida

Synonyms
- Macrosterni Fritsch, 1899; Palaeocoxopleura Verhoeff, 1928

= Archipolypoda =

Archipolypoda Temporal range: Lochkovian–Pennsylvanian

Extinct group of millipedes

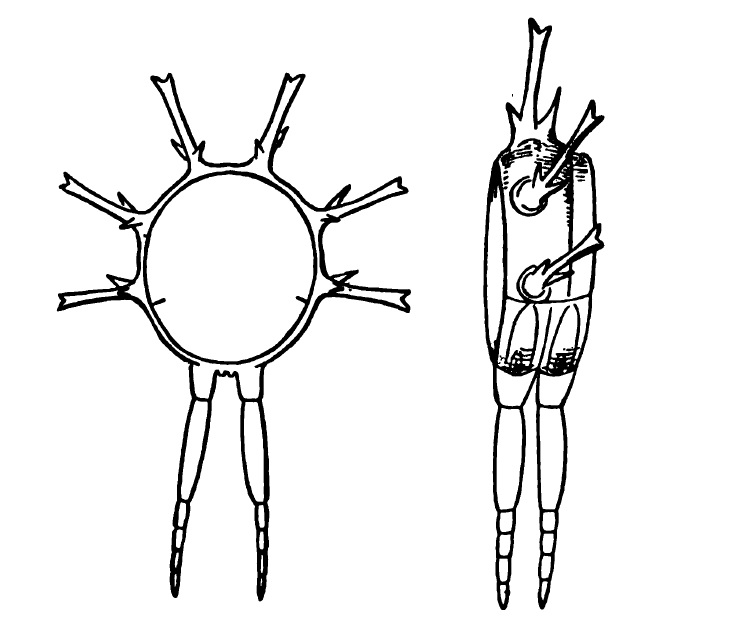
Cross-section (left) and side view (right) of a Euphoberiid archipolypodan body segment showing prominent tergal spines and two pair of legs.

Archipolypoda is an extinct group of millipedes known from fossils in Europe and North America and containing the earliest known land animals. The Archipolypoda was erected by Scudder (1882) but redefined in 2005 with the description of several new species from Scotland. Distinguishing characteristics include relatively large eyes with densely packed ocelli (sometimes interpreted as compound eyes), and modified leg pairs on the 8th body ring. Some species had prominent spines while others had a flattened appearance.

== Classification ==
The Archipolypoda as currently recognized consists of four orders, many with monotypic families and genera, as well as five species of uncertain placement (incertae sedis).

Archidesmida Wilson & Anderson, 2004

- Archidesmidae Scudder, 1885
  - Archidesmus macnicoli Peach, 1882. Lower Devonian, Scotland
- Zanclodesmidae Wilson, Daeschler & Desbiens, 2005
  - Zanclodesmus willetti Wilson, Daeschler & Desbiens, 2005. Upper Devonian, Quebec, Canada
  - Orsadesmus rubecollus Wilson, Daeschler & Desbiens, 2005. Upper Devonian, Pennsylvania, USA

Cowiedesmida Wilson & Anderson, 2004

- Cowiedesmidae Wilson & Anderson, 2004
  - Cowiedesmus eroticopodus Wilson & Anderson, 2004. Mid Silurian or Lower Devonian, Scotland.

Euphoberiida Hoffman, 1969

- Euphoberiidae Scudder, 1882. Upper Carboniferous of Europe and North America.
  - Acantherpestes Meek & Worthen, 1868
  - Euphoberia Meek & Worthen, 1868
  - Myriacantherpestes Burke, 1979

Palaeosomatida Hannibal & Krzeminski, 2005. Carboniferous, UK and Poland

- Palaeosomatidae Hannibal & Krzeminski, 2005
  - Palaeosoma

Order incertae sedis

- Albadesmus almondi Wilson & Anderson, 2004 Mid Silurian or Lower Devonian, Scotland
- Anaxeodesmus diambonotus Wilson, 2005 Upper Carboniferous, UK.
- Anthracodesmus macconochiei, Peach, 1899
- Palaeodesmus tuberculata (Brade-Birks, 1923) (=Kampecaris tuberculata) Lower Devonian, Scotland.
- Pneumodesmus newmani Wilson & Anderson, 2004 Mid Silurian or Lower Devonian, Scotland

== See also ==
- Arthropleuridea- Another group of extinct millipedes
- Euthycarcinoidea, a group of enigmatic arthropods that may be ancestral to myriapods
- Colonization of land, major evolutionary stages leading to terrestrial organisms
- Xanthomyria, a Cambrian fossil which closely resembles archipolypodans
