= Cowie Formation =

Geological formation in Scotland

- Stratigraphic range: late Wenlock to early Ludlow or Lochkovian
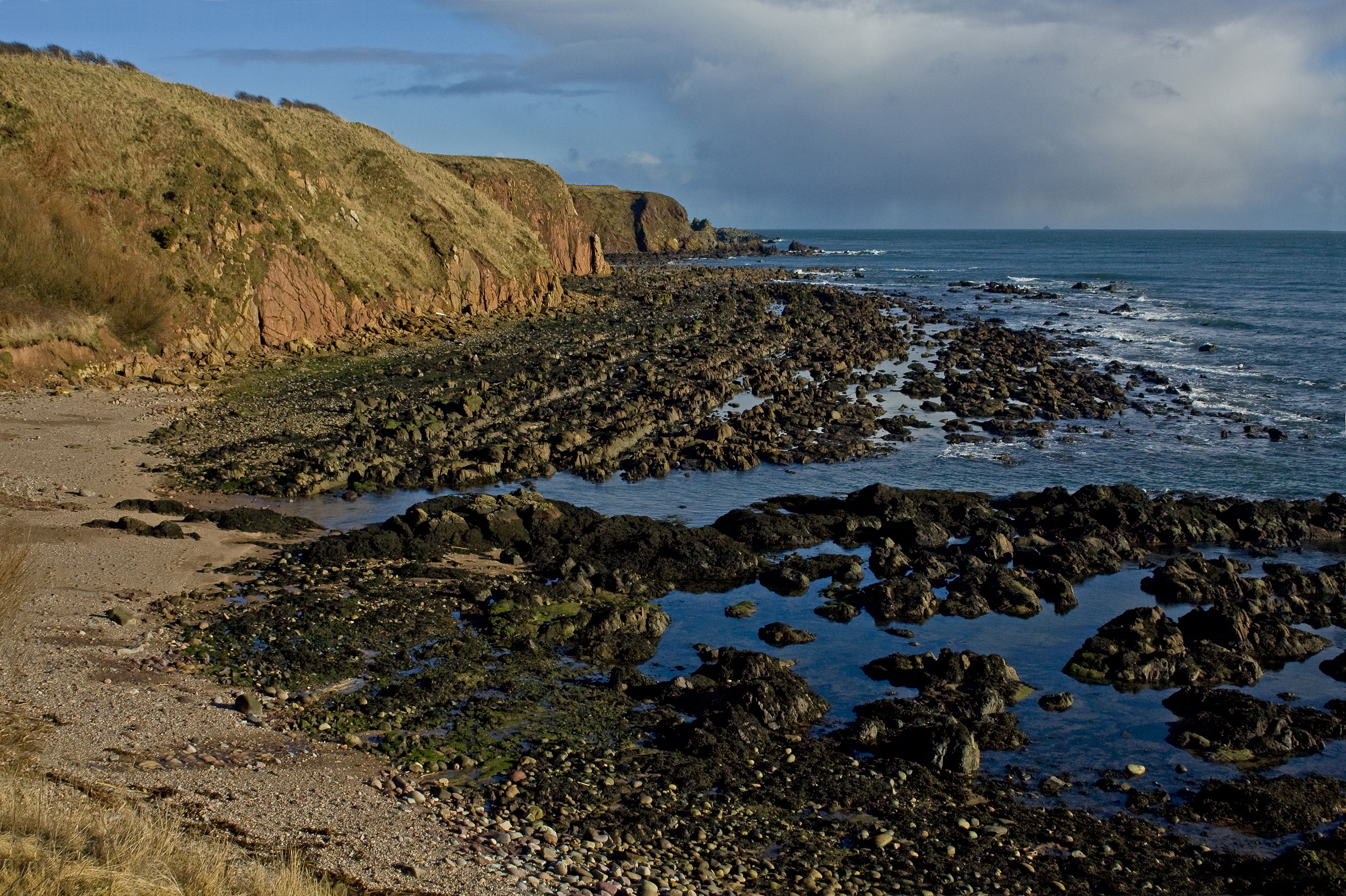
- Shoreline near Cowie
- Type: Formation

Location
- Region: Scotland
- Country: United Kingdom

The Cowie Formation is geological formation located on the Highland Boundary Fault between the fishing village of Cowie and Ruthery Head, in Aberdeenshire, Scotland. The age of this formation is controversial, originally estimated at the Middle Silurian, specifically Wenlock to Ludlow, but zircon geochronology points to the Early Devonian, Lochkovian instead. In study published in 2023, according to spore microfossils and additional zircon data, the Middle Silurian, late Wenlock age is suggested again. However, in 2024 it is considered as unsustainable because this conclusion is based on adjacent structurally separated block with different stratigraphy and sedimentology to the block with fossil productive Fish Bed. This formation preserves fossils, including a millipedes such as Pneumodesmus and Cowiedesmus that were discovered by Mike Newman in 2001, and some agnathan like Cowielepis.

== Geological History ==
The sandstones and mudstones that form the outcrops along the coast were mostly laid down by braided rivers crossing a semi-arid, low-relief landscape.

One particularly exciting find was made here in 2003 when a fragment of a fossil millipede was identified as the earliest known air-breathing animal in the world. It is celebrated in a display board on the seafront at Cowie.

One unusual feature of these layered sedimentary rocks is that they are tilted to the southeast at a very steep angle and therefore are seen edge on in the outcrops on the foreshore and is formally known as the Strathmore Syncline. When these layers are followed southeast for several kilometers, the degree of tilting towards the southeast is seen to decrease until the layers are almost horizontal and then steepen again as they begin to tilt towards the northwest, thus defining a broad U-shaped fold in the rock strata known as a syncline.

The tilting of the strata took place when two regions of the Earth's lithosphere (the relatively rigid outer layer of the planet, which includes the crust and uppermost Mantle) were subjected to strong compressive forces over a long period. This took place between about 500 and 400 million years ago when two plates were in collision, bringing together the ancient continents of Avalonia and Laurentia. One consequence of this collision was the buckling of the thick deposits of sedimentary rocks that had, at that time, recently accumulated in this northern part of the Midland Valley.

== Paleobiota ==
According to these references otherwise noted.

| Color key: Taxon / Reclassified taxon / Taxon falsely reported as present / Dubious taxon or junior synonym / Ichnotaxon / Ootaxon / Morphotaxon | Notes; Uncertain or tentative taxa are in small text; ~~crossed out~~ taxa are discredited. |

=== Vertebrates ===
Vertebrates
| Genus | Species | Notes | Images |
|---|---|---|---|
| Cowielepis | C. ritchiei | An anaspid. | |
| Hemicyclaspis | Indeterminate, once described as "Hemiteleaspis heintzi" | An osteostracan. | |
| Phialaspis | P. sp. | Traquairaspidiform. | |
| Traquairaspis | T. campbelli | Traquairaspidiform. | |

=== Aquatic arthropods ===
Aquatic arthropods
| Genus | Species | Notes | Images |
|---|---|---|---|
| Ceratiocaris | C. sp. | A phyllocarid. | |
| Dictyocaris | D. slimoni | Most common fossils from this site, considered as phyllocarid, while genus itself at least from other sites is identified as algae instead. | |
| Nanahughmilleria | N. norvegica | Eurypterids. | |
| Pterygotus | P. sp. | Eurypterids. | |
| Indeterminate | Hughmilleria sp., cf. H. (?) lata | Eurypterids. | |

=== Terrestrial arthropods ===
Terrestrial arthropods
| Genus | Species | Notes | Images |
|---|---|---|---|
| Albadesmus | A. almondi | Millipedes. | |
| Archidesmus | A. sp. | Millipedes. | |
| Cowiedesmus | C. eroticopodus | Millipedes. | |
| Pneumodesmus | P. newmani | Millipedes. | |
| Indeterminate | cf. Kampecaris sp. | Millipedes. | |

== See also ==
- List of fossiliferous stratigraphic units in Scotland
