= Zanclodesmus =

Zanclodesmus Temporal range: Frasnian

Scientific classification
- Kingdom: Animalia
- Phylum: Arthropoda
- Subphylum: Myriapoda
- Class: Diplopoda
- Order: †Archidesmida
- Family: †Zanclodesmidae
- Genus: †Zanclodesmus; Wilson et al., 2005
- Species: †Z. willetti

Binomial name
- †Zanclodesmus willetti Wilson, Daeschler, & Desbiens, 2005

Extinct genus of millipedes

Zanclodesmus willetti is an extinct species of archipolypodan millipede that lived in the Late Devonian period of North America, approximately 380 million years ago. It was described in 2005 based on a fossil discovered in the Escuminac Formation of Quebec, Canada two years prior. It was approximately 44 mm (1.7 in) long and 10 mm wide with 27 body segments, and had kidney shaped patches of ocelli (simple eyes). Each trunk segment had long, sickle-shaped extensions (paranota) projecting laterally, and was decorated on the dorsal surface with low rectangular bosses ("bumps") bordered by crescent-shaped bosses. The genus name Zanclodesmus derives from Greek Zanklon, meaning "sickle", in reference to the long, curved paranota, and desmus, a common root word in millipedes. The species name willietti honors Miguasha National Park warden Jason Willett, who discovered the fossil.
