= Xanthomyria =

Xanthomyria Temporal range: Guzhangian

Scientific classification
- Domain: Eukaryota
- Kingdom: Animalia
- Phylum: Arthropoda
- Class: incertae sedis
- Genus: †Xanthomyria; Budd et al, 2001
- Species: †X. spinosa

Binomial name
- †Xanthomyria spinosa Budd et al, 2001

Extinct genus of arthropod

Xanthomyria is a genus of Cambrian arthropod from the Ust-Mayan Formation of Siberia. It contains one species, Xanthomyria spinosa .

== Description ==
Xanthomyria is known from two specimens, exhibiting great variation in size. Neither specimen preserves the head or legs, therefore its affinity is uncertain. However, various structures of the exoskeleton such as tuberculate and spinose tergites with a broad rachis and narrow pleurae rule out most Cambrian clades of arthropod, and unusually in this regard Xanthomyria is most similar to Carboniferous archipolypodans such as Euphoberia. If this affinity is accurate, it would give millipedes an almost 100 million-year long ghost lineage from the late Cambrian to the late Silurian. However, it is more likely that Xanthomyria instead belongs to a wholly extinct myriapod-like clade of arthropods along with forms like Pseudoiulia, due to true stem-group myriapods which appear very different having been found in the Cambrian, in the form of Euthycarcinoidea. The tail has a small flap-like posterior termination. The robust calcareous tergites also have very simple articulation surfaces. The trunk is roughly 5.2 cm long and had at least 34 segments (possibly over 60, if the smaller specimen is the tail end of a larger animal instead of being a juvenile), with a slight taper towards the back.

== Etymology ==
Xanthomyria derives from the Greek words xanthos meaning "yellow", and myrios, meaning "countless" in reference to the yellowish colouration of the fossils alongside the inferred affinity with Myriapoda. The specific name spinosa derives from the long spines on each tergite.
