= Cowiedesmus =

Cowiedesmus Temporal range: Wenlock/Lochkovian

Scientific classification
- Kingdom: Animalia
- Phylum: Arthropoda
- Subphylum: Myriapoda
- Class: Diplopoda
- Subclass: Chilognatha
- Superorder: †Archipolypoda
- Order: †Cowiedesmida; Wilson & Anderson, 2004
- Family: †Cowiedesmidae; Wilson & Anderson, 2004
- Genus: †Cowiedesmus; Wilson & Anderson, 2004

Type species
- Cowiedesmus eroticopodus Wilson & Anderson, 2004

Extinct genus of millipedes

Cowiedesmus is an extinct millipede genus described from Scotland, and is considered as the earliest known land animals alongside Pneumodesmus from same formation. It is originally considered that it is from the middle Silurian, a 2017 study suggested that the geological formation it contains actually appears to be from the Early Devonian (Lochkovian) instead. Although a 2023 study confirmed the age identification of the 2004 study through palynological, palaeobotanical and zircon analyses incorporating newly discovered additional data, this is based on adjacent structurally separated block with different stratigraphy and sedimentology to the block with fossil site it was discovered, and it is confirmed as unsustainable. Cowiedesmus was about 4 cm (1.6 in) long and characterized by a greatly enlarged pair of legs on the 8th segment which may have been used in clasping females or functioned as gonopods (modified legs used to insert sperm during mating). Coweiedesmus is distinct enough from other living and fossil millipedes to be placed in its own order, Cowiedesmida. The only known species, C. eroticopodus, was described in 2004.

The name Cowiedesmus references the Cowie Formation, a geological formation at Cowie Harbor, near the village of Stonehaven, Scotland, where the fossil was found and desmus, a common root word in millipede nomenclature meaning "bond" or "bridge". The specific epithet eroticopodus means "erotic foot".
