= Palaeosoma =

Palaeosoma Temporal range: Westphalian–Namurian
- Palaeosoma giganteum fossil

Scientific classification
- Kingdom: Animalia
- Phylum: Arthropoda
- Subphylum: Myriapoda
- Class: Diplopoda
- Subclass: Chilognatha
- Superorder: †Archipolypoda
- Order: †Palaeosomatida; Hannibal & Krzeminski, 2005
- Family: †Palaeosomatidae; Hannibal & Krzeminski, 2005
- Genus: †Palaeosoma; Jackson et al. 1919

Type species
- Palaeosoma giganteum (Baldwin, 1911)

Species
- Palaeosoma giganteum (Baldwin, 1911); Palaeosoma robustum (Baldwin, 1911)

Extinct genus of millipedes

Palaeosoma is an extinct genus of archipolypodan millipedes from the upper Carboniferous of England and Poland. Individuals grew to nearly 20 cm (7.9 in) long and possessed defensive glands (ozopores) located on small raised nodes on the outer edges of the upper surface of each body segment. Species of Palaeosoma were once considered members of the family Euphoberiidae, which contains species with prominent spines, but are now classified in their own family (Paleosomatidae) and own order (Palaeosomatida), as they lack spines and have a combination of features not seen in other Paleozoic millipedes.
