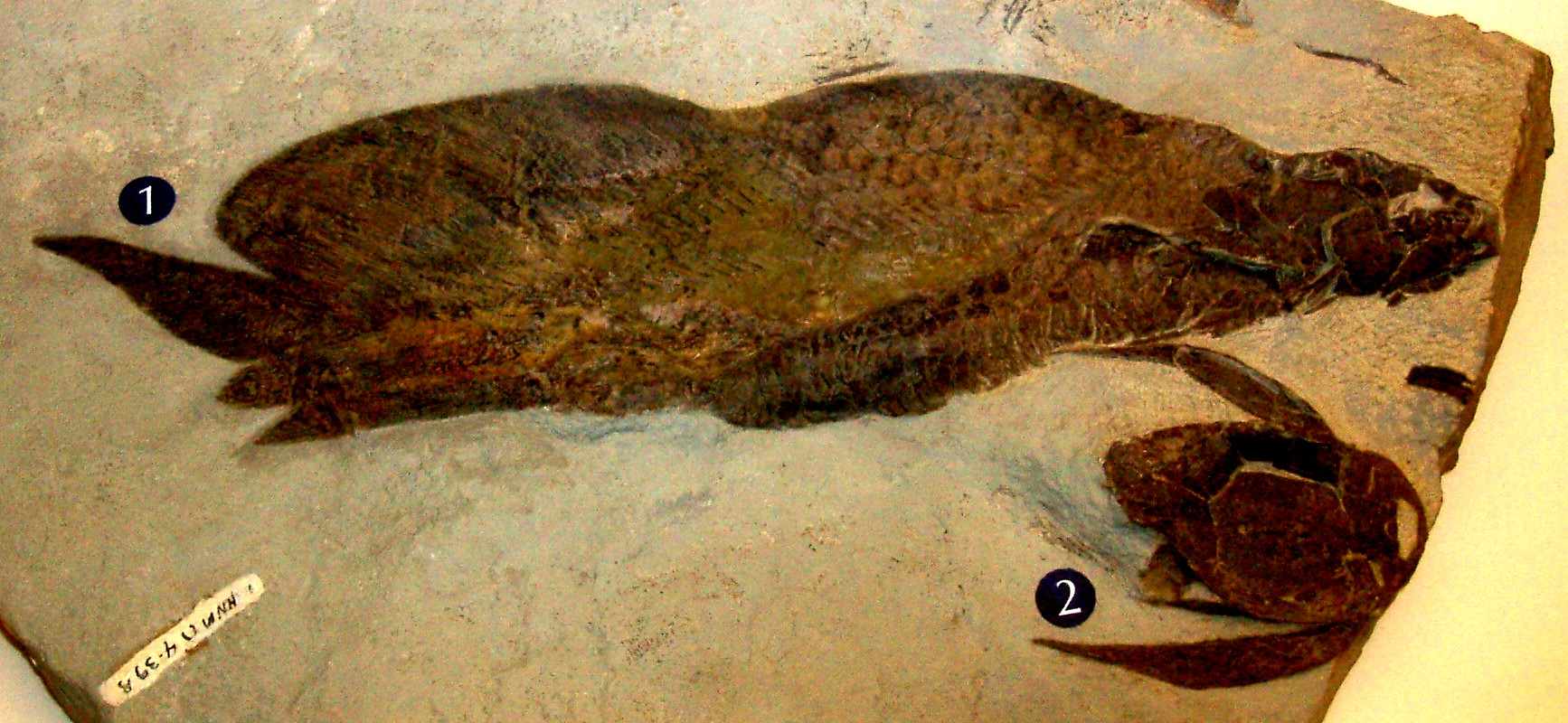
- Scaumenacia curta & Bothriolepis canadensis

Scientific classification
- Kingdom: Animalia
- Phylum: Chordata
- Class: Dipnoi
- Family: †Phaneropleuridae
- Genus: †Scaumenacia; Traquair, 1893

= Scaumenacia =

Extinct genus of fish

Scaumenacia is an extinct genus of lungfish. It lived around the Devonian in North America alongside another prehistoric lungfish: Fleurantia. It lived from approximately 384 to 376 millions of years ago.

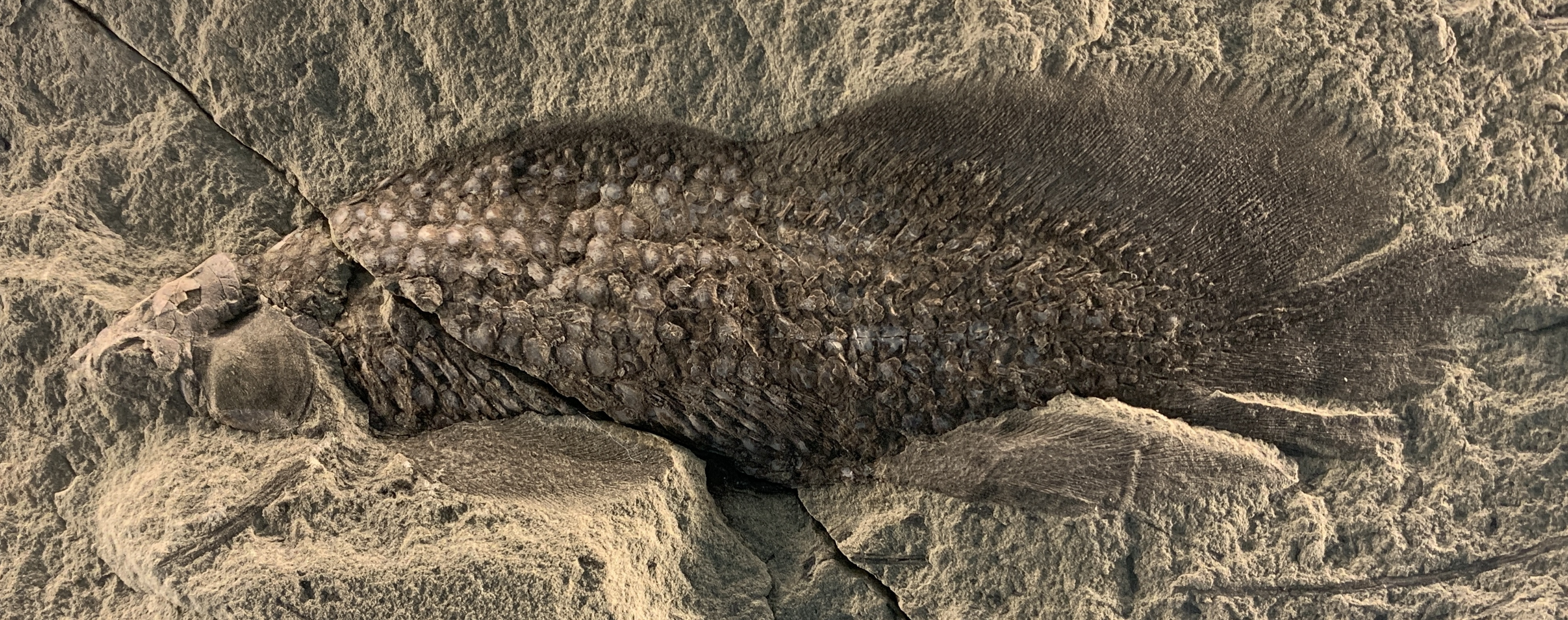
Scaumenacia curta. Late Devonian, Escuminac Formation, Quebec (Canada). At the Royal Tyrrell Museum of Palaeontology.

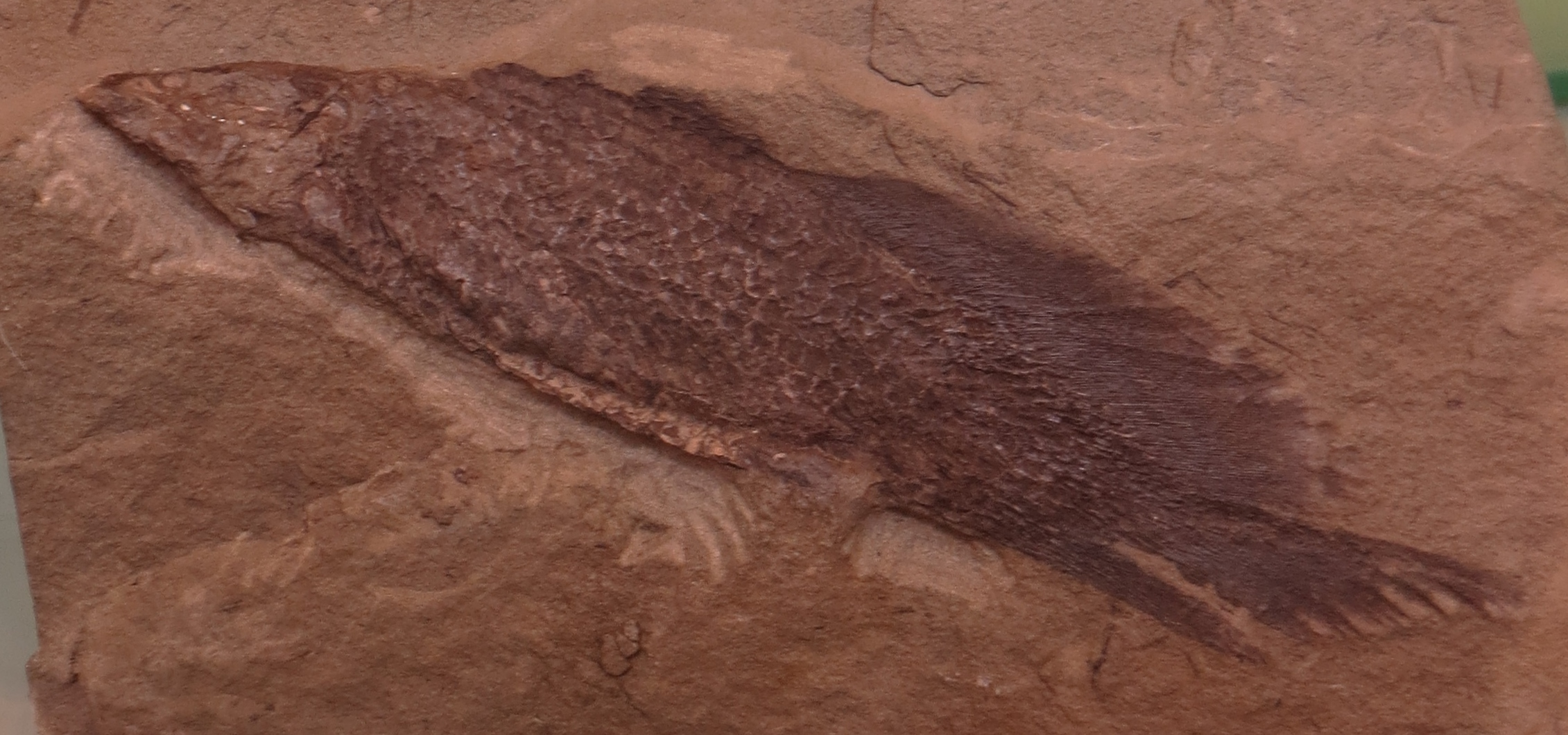
Scaumenacia curta. Late Devonian, Escuminac Formation, Quebec (Canada). At the Muséum national d'histoire naturelle.

== See also ==
- Sarcopterygii
- List of sarcopterygians
- List of prehistoric bony fish
