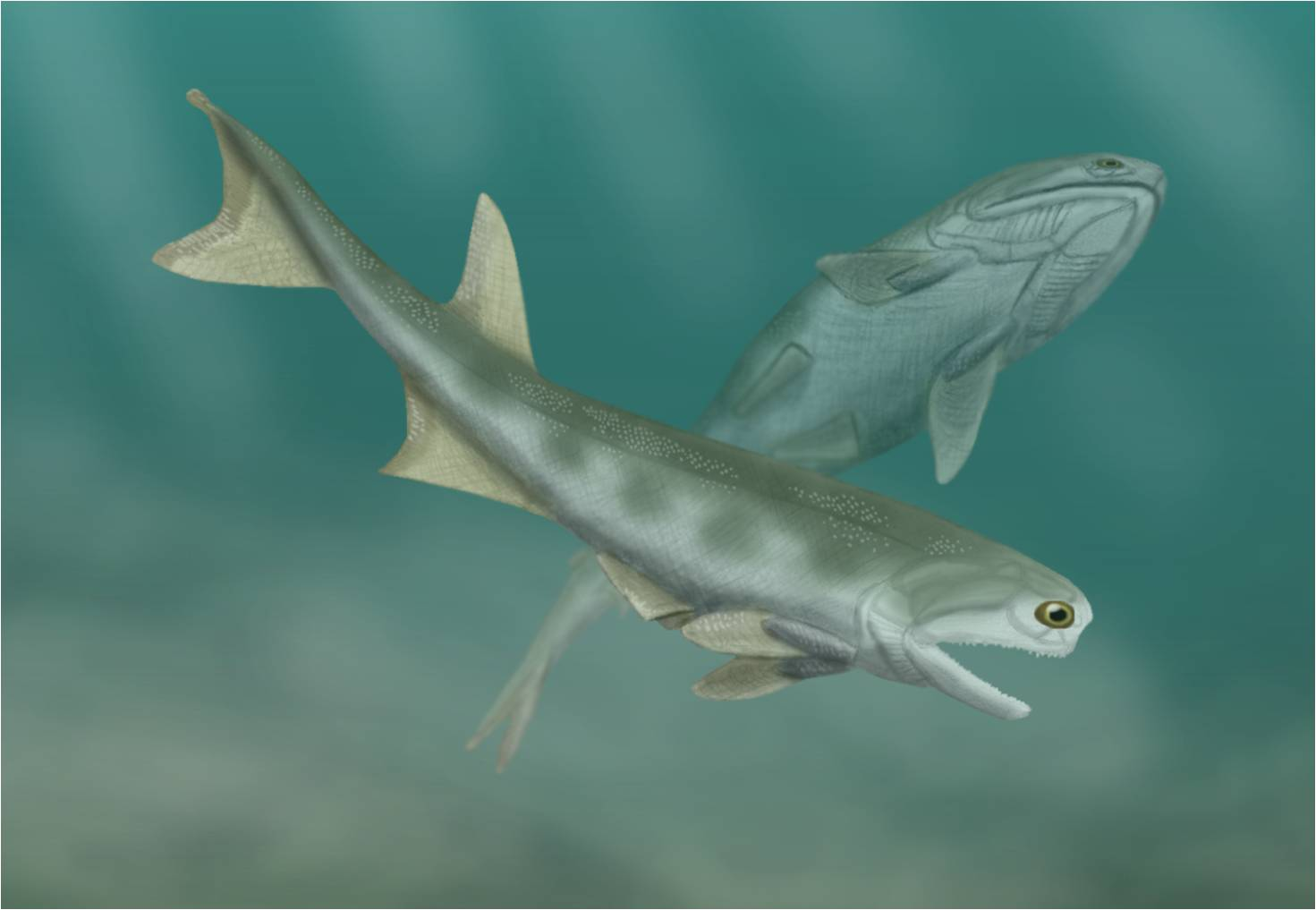
- Life restoration of two Cheirolepis

Scientific classification
- Kingdom: Animalia
- Phylum: Chordata
- Class: Actinopterygii
- Order: †Cheirolepidiformes; Kazantzeva-Selezneva, 1977
- Family: †Cheirolepididae; Pander, 1860
- Genus: †Cheirolepis; Agassiz, 1835

Type species
- †Cheirolepis trailli Agassiz, 1835

Other species
- See text

= Cheirolepis =

Cheirolepis Temporal range: Middle Devonian to Late Devonian

Extinct genus of ray-finned fishes

Cheirolepis (from Greek: χείρ kheír, 'hand' and Greek: λεπίς lepis 'scale') is an extinct genus of marine and freshwater ray-finned fish that lived in the Devonian period of Europe and North America. It is the only genus yet known within the family Cheirolepididae and the order Cheirolepidiformes. It was among the most basal of the Devonian actinopterygians and is considered the first to possess the "standard" dermal cranial bones seen in later actinopterygians.

Cheirolepis was a predatory freshwater and estuarine animal about 55 centimetres (22 in) long. It had a streamlined body with small, triangular ganoid scales similar to those of the Acanthodii. These scales had a basic structure typical of many early osteichthyans, with a superficial of ganoine overlying dentine, and a basal plate of bone. Cheirolepis had well-developed fins which gave it speed and stability, and was probably an active predator. Based on the size of its eyes, it hunted by sight. Cheirolepis's jaws, lined with sharp teeth, could be opened very wide, allowing it to swallow prey two thirds of its own size.

== Species ==
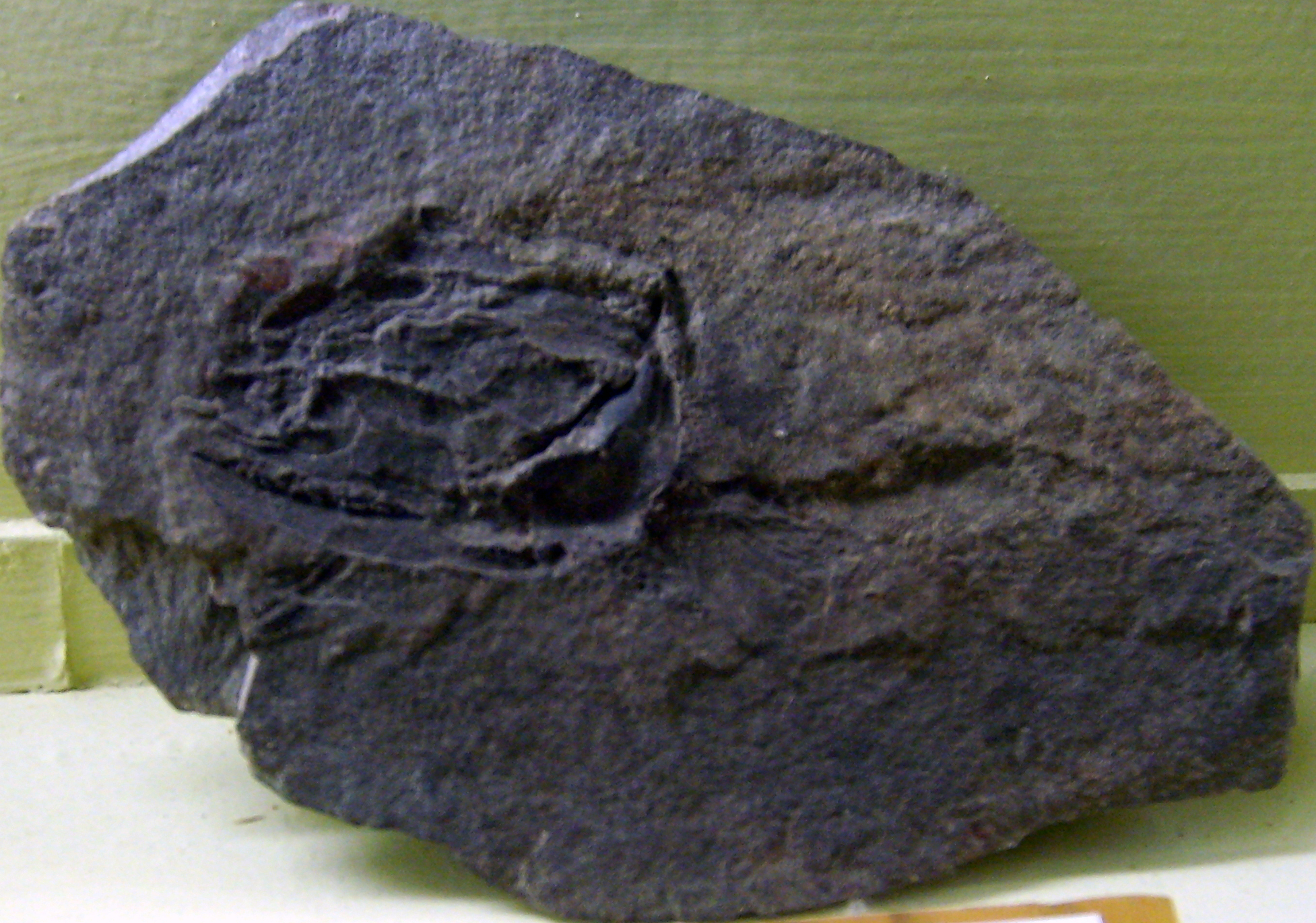
Cheirolepis trailli fossil at the Museum für Naturkunde, Berlin

The following species are known:

- †C. aleshkai Plax, 2020 - Middle Devonian (Eifelian) of Belarus
- †C. bychovensis Plax, 2022 - Middle Devonian (Emsian & Eifelian) of Belarus
- †C. canadensis Whiteaves, 1881 - Late Devonian (Frasnian) of Miguasha, Canada (Escuminac Formation)
- †C. gaugeri Gross, 1973 - Middle Devonian (Givetian) of Belarus (Polotsk Formation) & Estonia (Burtnieki Formation)
- †C. gracilis Gross, 1973 - Emsian & Eifelian of Belarus (Gorodok Formation) & Estonia (Narva & Pärnu Formations)
- †C. jonesi Newman, Burrow, den Blaauwen & Giles, 2021 - Givetian of Spitsbergen, Svalbard (Tordalen Formation)
- †C. trailli Agassiz, 1835 (type species) - Middle Devonian (Eifelian & Givetian) of Scotland (Caithness Flagstone)
- †C. schultzei Arratia & Cloutier, 2004 - Middle Devonian (Givetian) of Nevada, USA (Denay Limestone)

C. schultzei is known from Red Hill, Nevada deposited during the Mid-Late Devonian boundary. The specimen from which this species was named, consisting of scales and a lower jaw, was originally referred to C. canadensis. Many species, including C. aleshkai,C. bychovensis, C. gracilis & C. gaugeri are only known from isolated scales.

The species C. sinualis from Belarus is considered a nomen nudum. The species C. cummingae Agassiz, 1845, C. macrocephalus M'Coy 1848, & C. uragus Agassiz, 1835 are considered conspecific with C. trailli

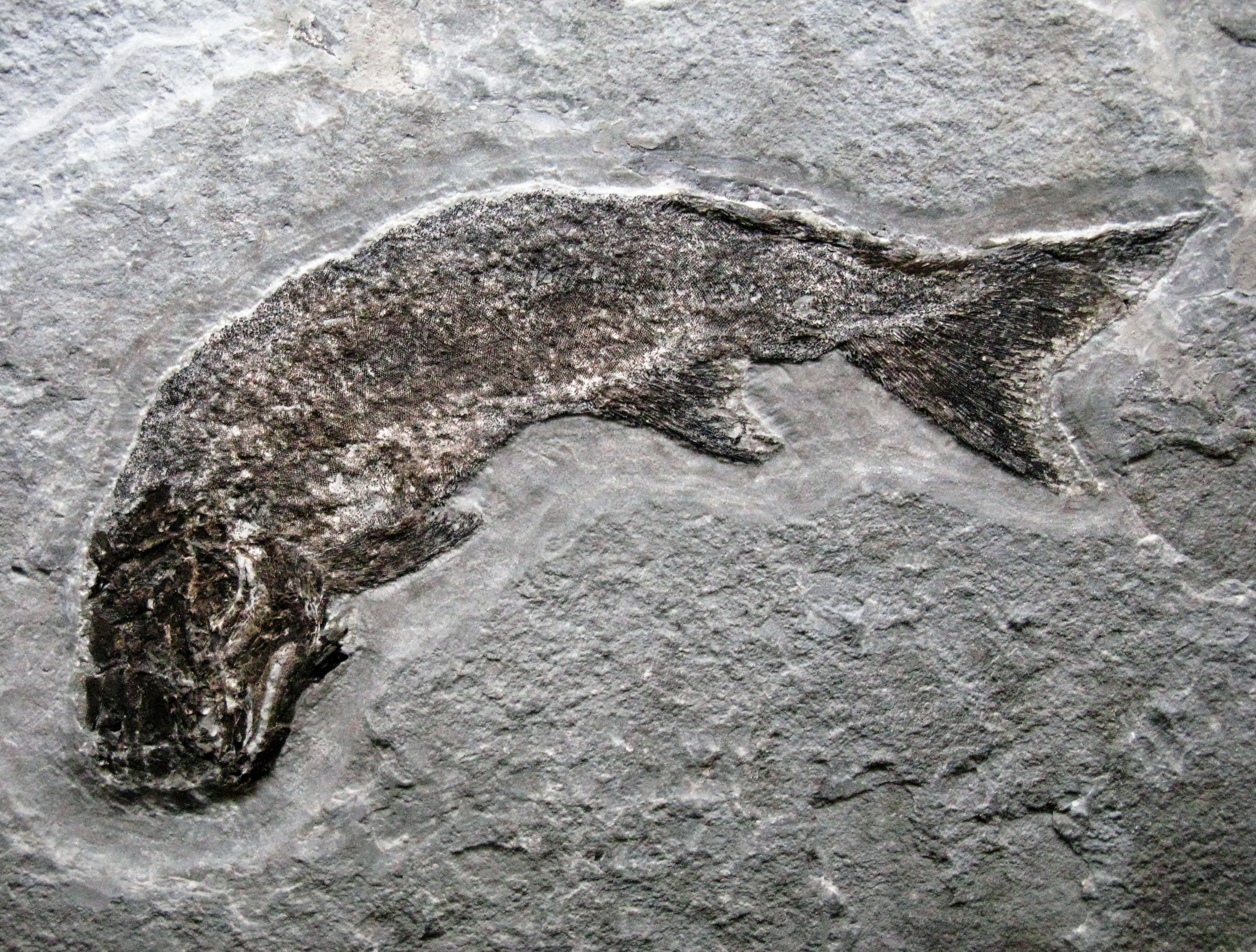
C. canadensis on display at Miguasha National Park.
