= Ganoine =

Fish scale covering

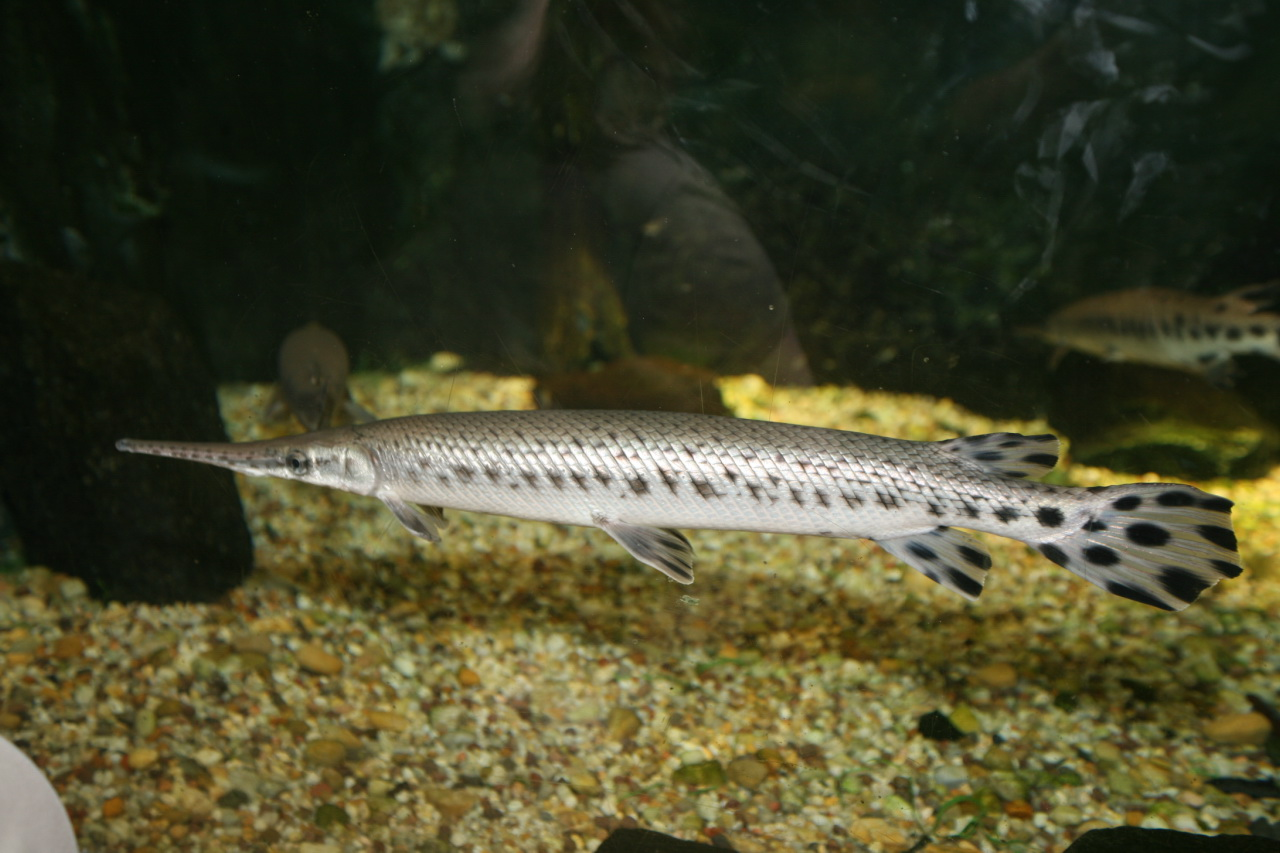
The glassy appearance of the scales of this spotted gar is due to ganoine.

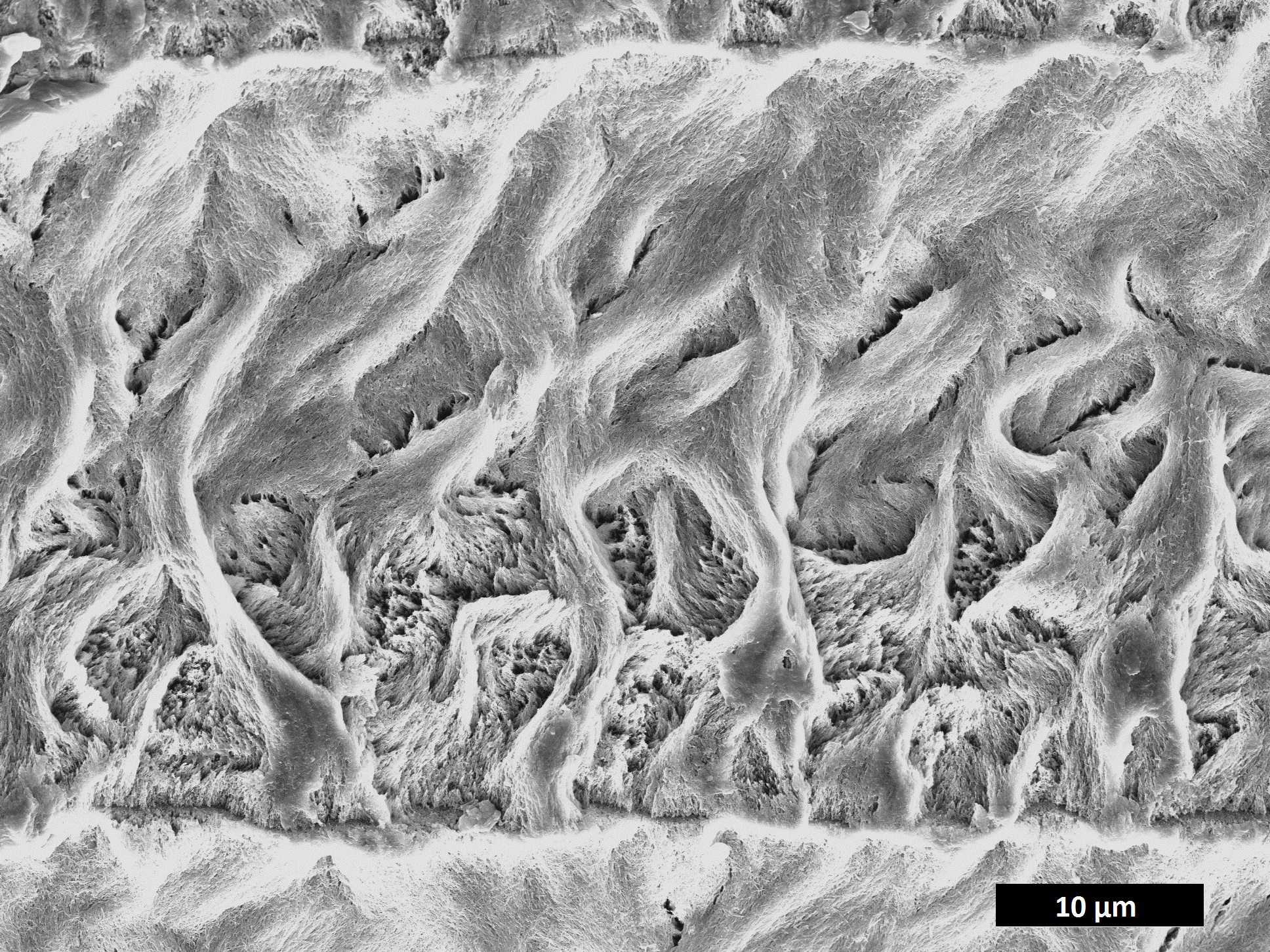
The mineral texture of alligator gar scales consists of bundles of cross-plied hydroxyapatite minerals oriented towards the scale's surface.

Ganoine or ganoin is a glassy, often multi-layered mineralized tissue that covers the scales, cranial bones and fin rays in some non-teleost ray-finned fishes, such as gars and bichirs, as well as lobe-finned coelacanths. It is composed of rod-like, pseudoprismatic apatite crystallites, with less than 5% of organic matter. Existing fish groups featuring ganoin are bichirs and gars, but ganoin is also characteristic of several extinct taxa. It is a characteristic component of ganoid scales.

Ganoine is an ancient feature of ray-finned fishes, being found for example on the scales of stem group actinopteryigian Cheirolepis. While often considered a synapomorphic character of ray-finned fishes, ganoine or ganoine-like tissues are also found on the extinct acanthodii.

It has been suggested that ganoine is homologous to tooth enamel in vertebrates or even considered a type of enamel. Ganoine indeed contains amelogenin-like proteins and has a mineral content similar to that of tetrapod tooth enamel.
