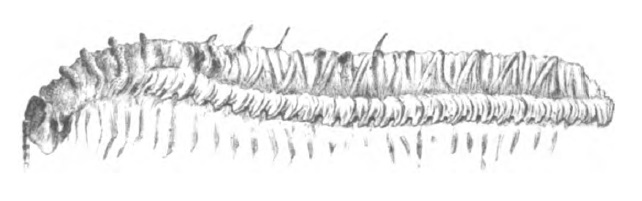
- Euphoberia spinulosa

Scientific classification
- Kingdom: Animalia
- Phylum: Arthropoda
- Subphylum: Myriapoda
- Class: Diplopoda
- Order: †Euphoberiida
- Family: †Euphoberiidae
- Genus: †Euphoberia; Meek & Worthen, 1868

Type species
- Euphoberia armigera Meek & Worthen, 1868

Species
- E. anguilla Scudder, 1882; E. armigera Meek & Worthen, 1868; E. carri Scudder, 1882; E. cuspidata Scudder, 1890; E. flabellata Scudder, 1882; E. granosa Scudder, 1882; E. simplex Scudder 1890; E. spinulosa Scudder 1890; E. tracta Scudder 1890

= Euphoberia =

Euphoberia Temporal range: Pennsylvanian

Extinct genus of many-legged arthropods

Euphoberia is an extinct genus of millipede from the Pennsylvanian epoch of the Late Carboniferous, measuring up to 15 centimetres (5.9 in) in length. It is a relatively small member of the Euphoberiidae, which contains species with length about 30 centimetres (12 in). Fossils have been found in Europe and North America.

There has been uncertainty about the appropriate classification of Euphoberia since its description in 1868: it has been referred to as a centipede, millipede, or a separate, independent group within the myriapods. It is currently placed in the Archipolypoda, an extinct group of millipedes. Several species described in the late 19th century have since been assigned to the related genera Myriacantherpestes and Acantherpestes.

Juvenile Euphoberia fossils have been found in groups of 10-19 individuals, suggesting that Archipolypoda displayed similar group migration behavior to some extant millipedes.
