= Escuminac Formation =

Geologic formation in Quebec, Canada

- Stratigraphic range: Devonian (Middle Frasnian) 385–374 Ma
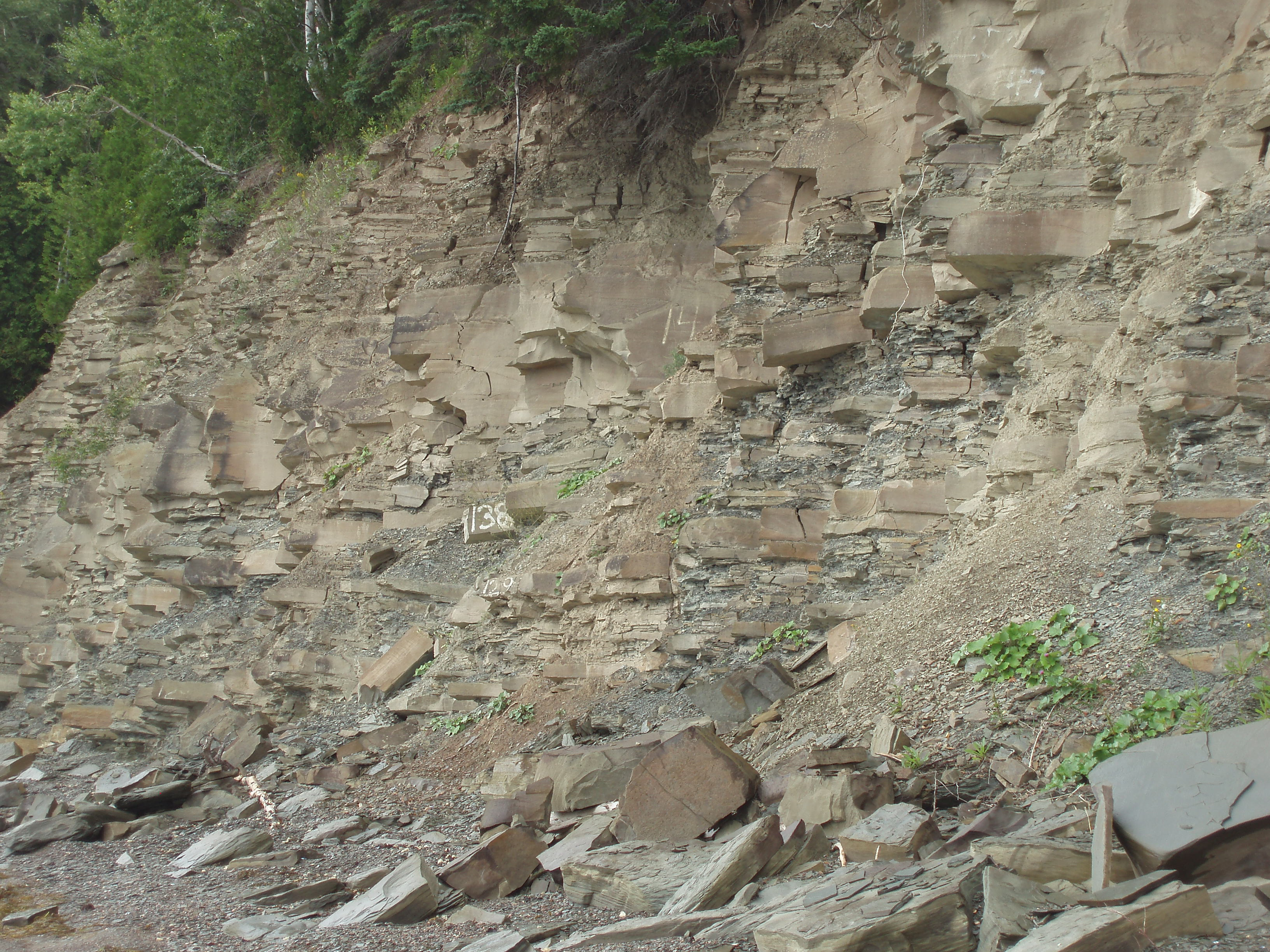
- Outcrops of the Escuminac Formation in Miguasha National Park
- Type: Geological formation
- Unit of: Miguasha Group
- Underlies: Bonaventure Formation
- Overlies: Fleurant Formation

Location
- Region: Quebec
- Country: Canada

The Escuminac Formation is a geologic formation in Quebec. It preserves fossils dating back to the Frasnian, in the Devonian period.

== Description ==
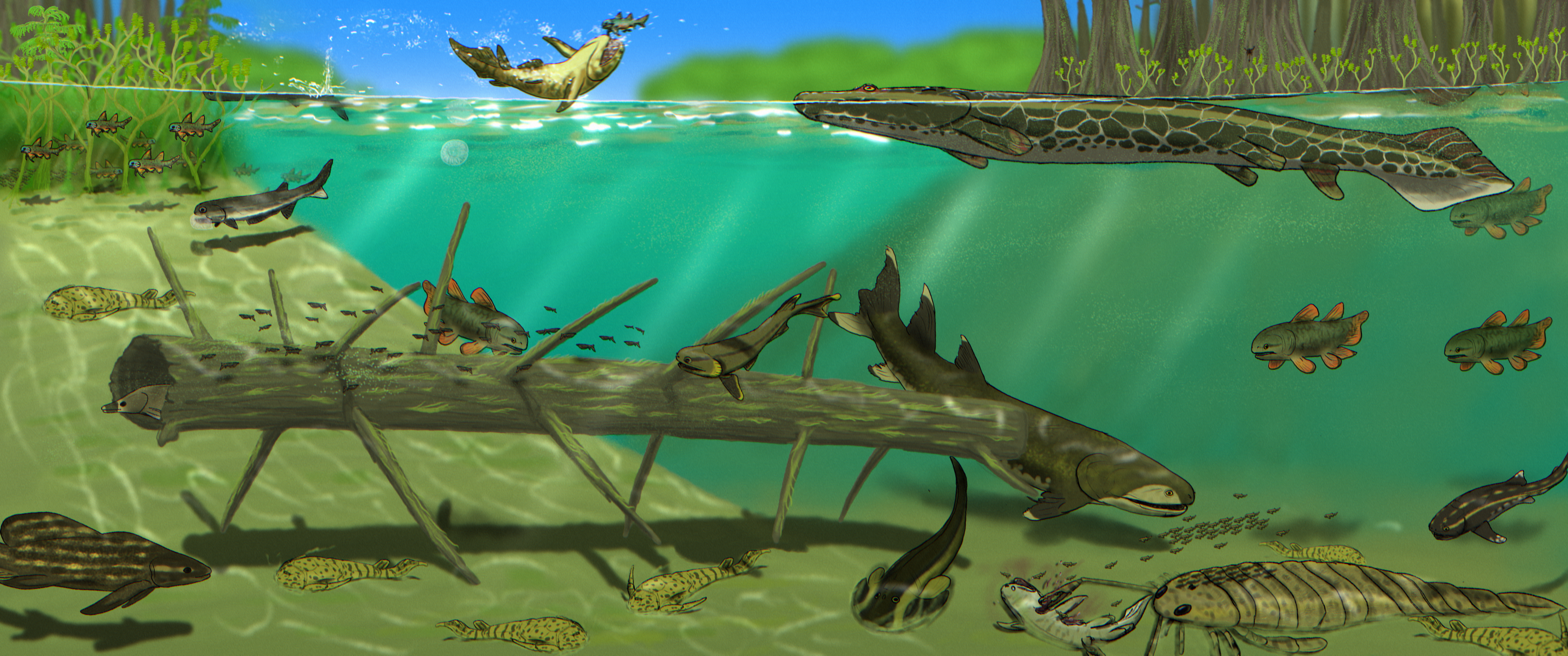
A reconstruction of the paleoenvironment of the Escuminac Formation.

Miguasha National Park is located within this formation along the estuary of the Restigouche River on the south coast of the Gaspé Peninsula. The fossil biota from the Park is thus referred to as the Miguasha biota. The main Miguasha exposures were named the 'René Bureau Cliffs' after the geologist and paleontologist. This formation is sufficiently rich that some material could be sacrificed for microanatomical and histological study through thin sectioning; this was done, among others, for the actinopterygian Cheirolepis, the actinistian Miguashaia and the tetrapodomorph Euthenopteron.

The formation's depositional environment has been variously considered as lacustrine, estuarine, coastal marine or marine, though evidence from the fossil assemblage, stratigraphic and sedimentological setting, and geochemistry of the sedimentary rocks and bones suggests an estuarine interpretation is most fitting.

== Fossil content ==
=== Vertebrates ===
==== Acanthodians ====
Acanthodians
Genus	Species	Presence	Material	Notes	Images
Diplacanthus	D. ellsi			A diplacanthiform.	
Diplacanthus	D. horridus			A diplacanthiform.	
Homalacanthus	H. concinnus				
Triazeugacanthus	T. affinis	Miguasha, Quebec.	Thousands of specimens representing multiple ontogenetic stages.		

==== Actinopterygians ====
Actinopterygians
Genus	Species	Presence	Material	Notes	Images
Cheirolepis	C. canadensis				

==== Jawless fish ====
Jawless fish
Genus	Species	Presence	Material	Notes	Images
Endeiolepis	E. aneri				
Escuminaspis	E. laticeps				
Euphanerops	E. longaevus	Miguasha.	Over 3,500 specimens.	A euphaneropid.	
Levesquaspis	L. patteni				

==== Placoderms ====
Placoderms
Genus	Species	Presence	Material	Notes	Images
Bothriolepis	B. canadensis			An antiarch.	
Plourdosteus	P. canadensis			An arthrodire.	

==== Sarcopterygians ====
Sarcopterygians
Genus	Species	Presence	Material	Notes	Images
Callistiopterus	C. clappi				
Elpistostege	E. watsoni			A stegocephalian.	
Eusthenopteron	E. foordi			A tristichopterid.	
Fleurantia	F. denticulata			A lungfish.	
Holoptychiidae	Holoptychiidae nov. sp.			A porolepiform.	
Holoptychius	H. jarviki			A porolepiform.	
Miguashaia	M. bureaui	Miguasha, Quebec.		A coelacanth.	
Quebecius	Q. quebecensis			A porolepiform.	
Scaumenacia	S. curta			A lungfish.	

=== Invertebrates ===
==== Arthropods ====
Arthropods
Genus	Species	Presence	Material	Notes	Images
Asmusia	A. membranacea			A clam shrimp.	
Pterygotus	P. sp.			An eurypterid.	
Petaloscorpio	P. bureaui			A scorpion.	
Zanclodesmus	Z. willetti			A millipede.	

==== Ctenophores ====
Ctenophores
Genus	Species	Presence	Material	Notes	Images
Daihuoides	D. jakobvintheri	Miguasha, Quebec.	MHNM 24–01.		

=== Plants ===
Plants
Genus	Species	Presence	Material	Notes	Images
Archaeopteris	A. halliana				
Barynophyton					
Flabellofolium					
Protobarynophyton					
Spermasporites					

== See also ==
- List of fossiliferous stratigraphic units in Quebec
