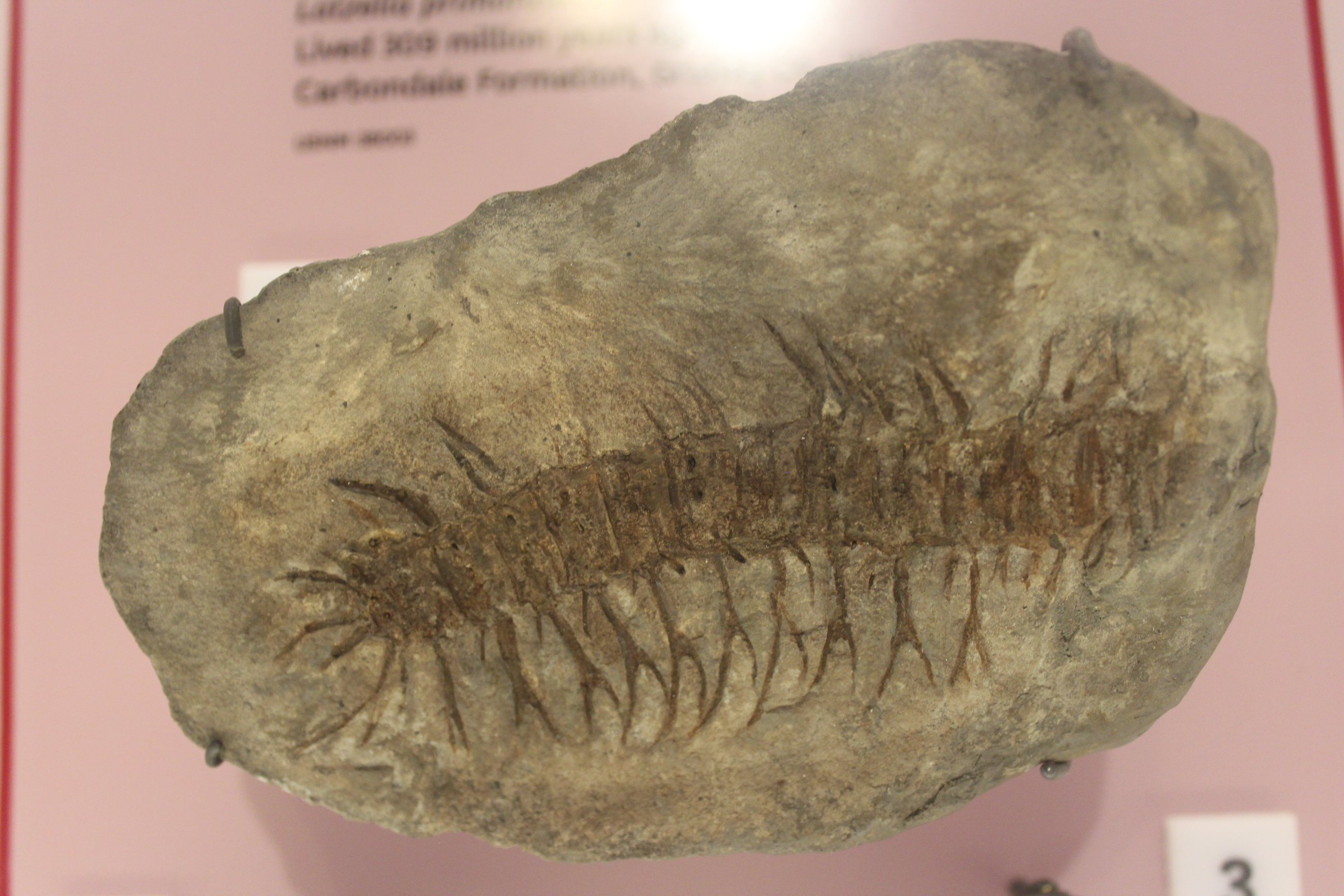
- M. hystricosus fossil, National Museum of Natural History
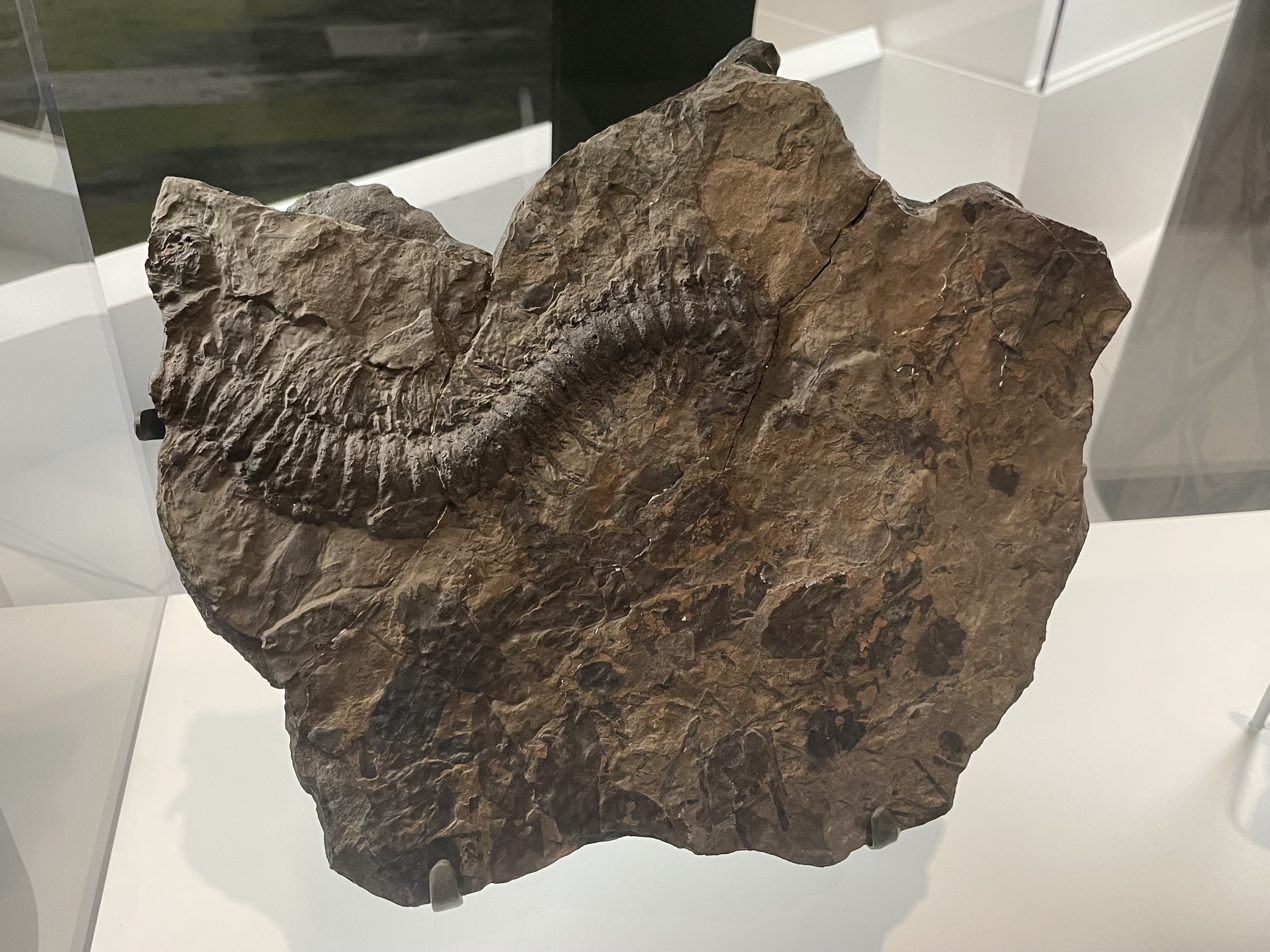
- Fossil of Myriacantherpestes clarkorum

Scientific classification
- Kingdom: Animalia
- Phylum: Arthropoda
- Subphylum: Myriapoda
- Class: Diplopoda
- Order: †Euphoberiida
- Family: †Euphoberiidae
- Genus: †Myriacantherpestes; Burke, 1979

Type species
- Eurypterus? (Arthropleura) ferox Salter 1863

Species
- M. bradebirksi Burke 1979; M. clarkorum (Burke 1973); M. excrescens (Janssen 1940); M. ferox (Salter 1863); M. hystricosus (Scudder 1890); M. inequalis (Scudder 1890)

= Myriacantherpestes =

Myriacantherpestes Temporal range: Late Carboniferous

Extinct genus of millipedes

Myriacantherpestes is an extinct genus of spiny millipedes from the Pennsylvanian subperiod of the Carboniferous period, known from fossils in Europe and North America.

== Description ==
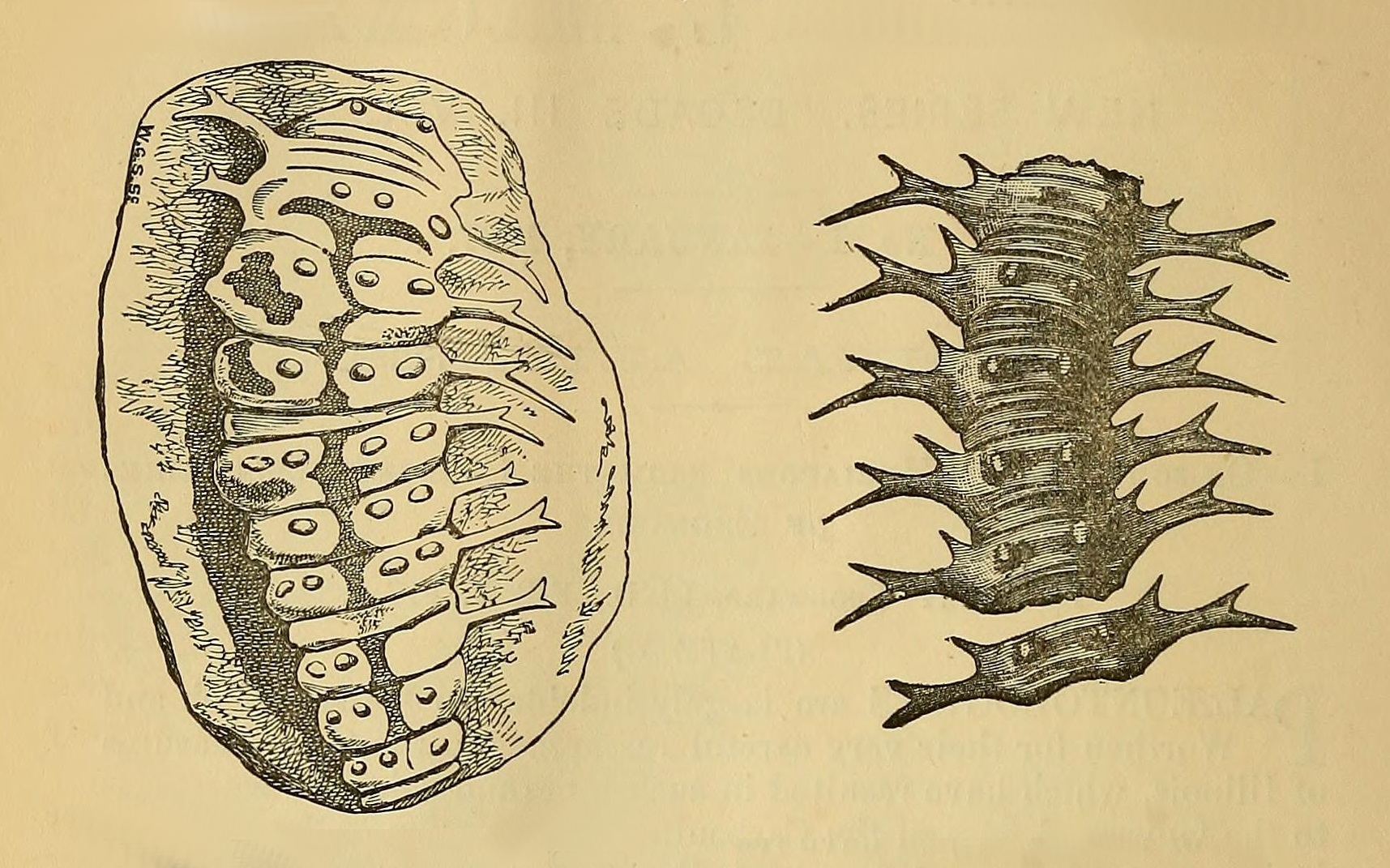
Two illustrations of M. ferox fossils

Like other euphoberiids, Myriacantherpestes had prominent dorsal and lateral spines. Myriacantherpestes differs from other members of Euphoberiidae in part by having much longer lateral spines and a more flattened body. Myriacantherpestes had a row of ozopores running down the body near the base of the anterolateral spines, which likely secreted defensive chemicals as in modern millipedes. The head of Myriacantherpestes bore large dorsally-facing compound eyes and toothed mandibles. The largest species of Myriacantherpestes were about 12 inches (30 cm) in length.

== Taxonomic history ==
Several species currently assigned to Myriacantherpestes were formerly in the genera Acantherpestes and Euphoberia. The species M. excrescens was originally described as a fossilized cycad seed.
