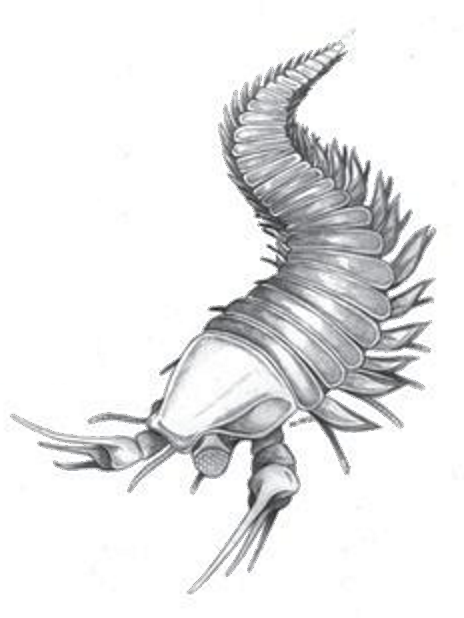
- Reconstruction of K. deppi as megacheiran, which is questioned in subsequent studies

Scientific classification
- Kingdom: Animalia
- Phylum: Arthropoda
- Class: incertae sedis
- Family: †Kootenichelidae
- Genus: †Kootenichela; Legg, 2013
- Species: †K. deppi

Binomial name
- †Kootenichela deppi Legg, 2013

= Kootenichela =

Kootenichela Temporal range: Middle Cambrian

Extinct genus of arthropods

Kootenichela deppi is an extinct arthropod described from the Middle Cambrian of the Kootenay National Park, Canada. It is originally considered to be a member of "great appendage arthropods", although subsequent studies questioned its affinity. Kootenichela appears to be the sister taxon of Worthenella, from cladistic analysis.

== Etymology ==
The species name deppi comes from the actor Johnny Depp, after his role as Edward Scissorhands in the film of the same name. David Legg, the discoverer of Kootenichela, said:

"When I first saw the pair of isolated claws in the fossil records of this species I could not help but think of Edward Scissorhands. Even the genus name, Kootenichela, includes the reference to this film as 'chela' is Latin for claws or scissors. In truth, I am also a bit of a Depp fan and so what better way to honour the man than to immortalise him as an ancient creature that once roamed the sea?"

== Morphology and affinities ==
Kootenichela appears to be a primitive arthropod. It has an elongated body composed of at least 29 segments of similar shape and appearance. On the head, there are large eyes supported by stalks and an appendage resembling an antenna. The appendages bound to the trunk are poorly sclerotised. It was approximately 4 centimetres (1.6 in) long. Most prominent are the claw-like, spinose cephalic appendages, which seem to suggest affinities with Megacheira, the "great appendage" arthropods. However, study in 2015 researchers could confirm neither the head configuration nor the megacheiran interpretation of the anatomy. Kootenichela has been subsequently suggested to be a chimera of various arthropods such as a bivalved arthropod.

== Classification ==
The arthropod Pseudoiulia has been suggested to be closely related to Kootenichela and Worthenella, the three being classified into the family Kootenichelidae.

== See also ==
- List of organisms named after famous people (born 1950–1974)
