= Pseudoiulia =

Pseudoiulia Temporal range: Early Cambrian–Mid Cambrian

Scientific classification
- Kingdom: Animalia
- Phylum: Arthropoda
- Genus: †Pseudoiulia Hou and Bergstrom, 1998
- Species: †P. cambriensis

Binomial name
- †Pseudoiulia cambriensis Hou and Bergstrom, 1998

Extinct genus of arthropod

Pseudoiulia is a genus of Cambrian arthropod known from the Chengjiang Biota of Yunnan, China, containing the single species P. cambriensis. It is considered poorly known, but has been somewhat associated with other Chengjiang Biota fauna such as Dongshania folliformis and Pisinnocaris subconigera. In 2013, Pseudoiulia was suggested to be a member of the family Kootenichelidae, alongside Kootenichela and Worthenella.
