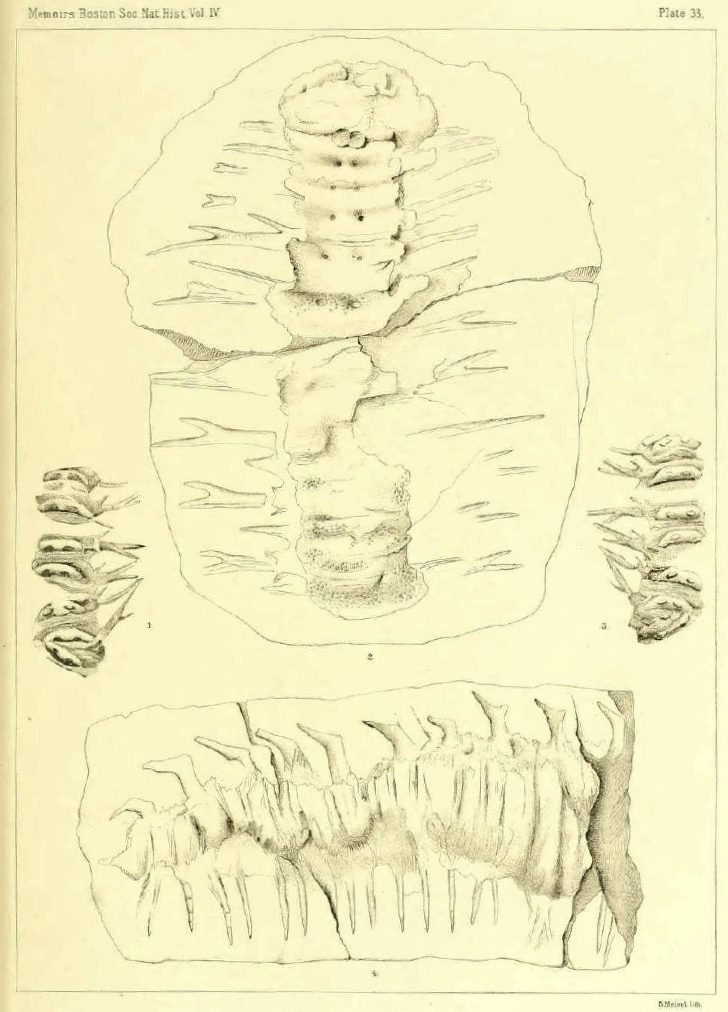
- Myriacantherpestes fossils

Scientific classification
- Kingdom: Animalia
- Phylum: Arthropoda
- Subphylum: Myriapoda
- Class: Diplopoda
- Subclass: Chilognatha
- Superorder: †Archipolypoda
- Order: †Euphoberiida; Hoffman, 1969
- Family: †Euphoberiidae; Scudder, 1882

Genera
- Acantherpestes; Euphoberia; Myriacantherpestes

= Euphoberiidae =

Euphoberiidae Temporal range: Namurian–Stephanian

Extinct family of millipedes

Euphoberiidae is an extinct family of archipolypodan millipedes known from the Upper Pennsylvanian of Europe and North America. The family includes relatively large millipedes, measuring up to 30 cm (12 in) long, and were the dominant millipedes of the Pennsylvanian.

== Description ==
Euphoberiids are characterized by sets of outward-pointing spines on each diplosegment, one pair extending laterally, the other pair higher on the body. At the base of each lateral spine is an ozopore, or defensive gland opening. Species of Acantherpestes and Euphoberia have cylindrical bodies, while those of Myriacantherpestes are more flattened in appearance.
