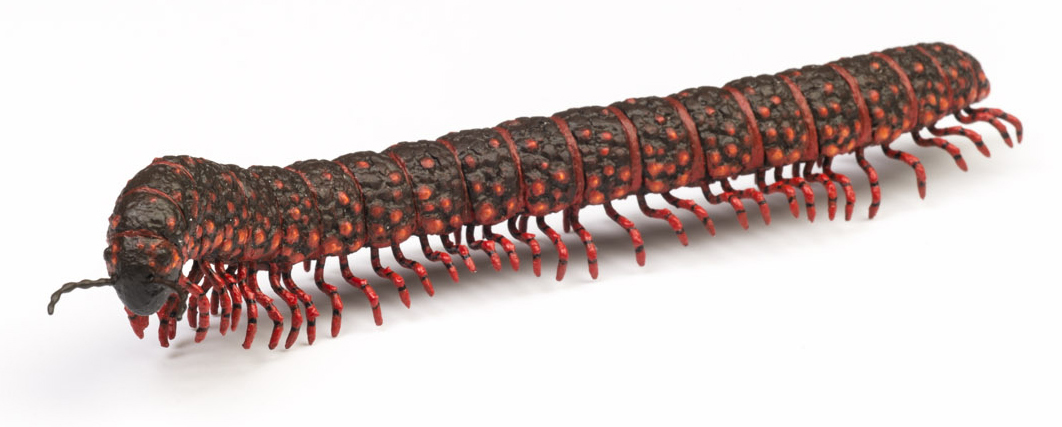
- Reconstruction of P. newmani
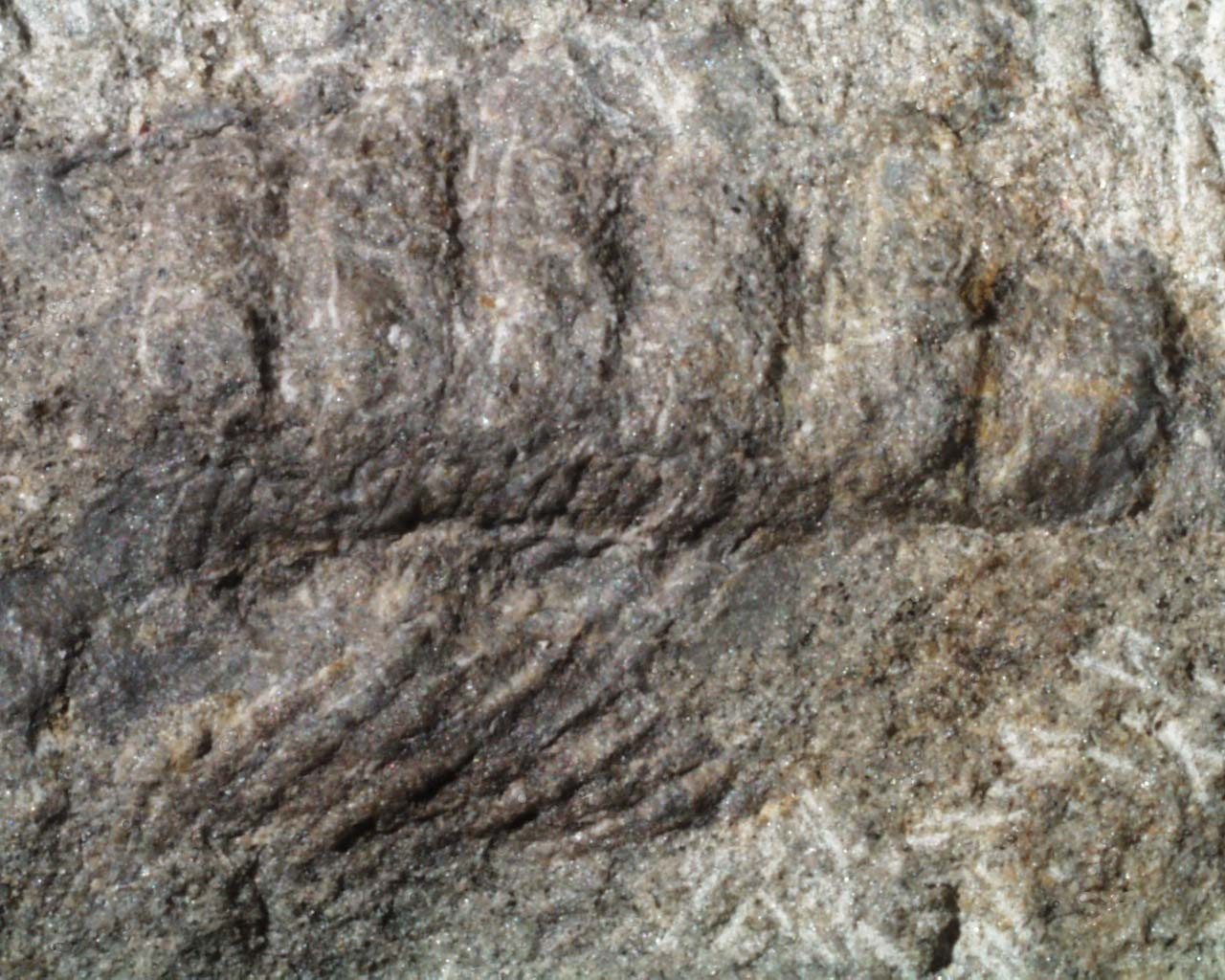
- Photomicrograph of the type specimen

Scientific classification
- Kingdom: Animalia
- Phylum: Arthropoda
- Subphylum: Myriapoda
- Class: Diplopoda
- Superorder: †Archipolypoda
- Order: †incertae sedis
- Family: †incertae sedis
- Genus: †Pneumodesmus; Wilson & Anderson, 2004
- Species: †P. newmani

Binomial name
- †Pneumodesmus newmani Wilson & Anderson, 2004

= Pneumodesmus =

Pneumodesmus Temporal range: Pridoli–Lochkovian

Genus of millipedes

Pneumodesmus newmani is a species of myriapod that lived in what is now Scotland during the latest Silurian and earliest Devonian period (Pridoli–Lochkovian epoch). It is one of the first myriapods, and among the oldest creatures to have lived on land. It was discovered in 2004, and is known from a single specimen from Stonehaven, Aberdeenshire.

== Discovery and naming ==
The fossil of P. newmani was found by Mike Newman, a bus driver and amateur palaeontologist from Aberdeen, in a layer of sandstone rocks on the foreshore of Cowie, near Stonehaven (Cowie Formation). The species was later given the specific epithet "newmani" in honour of Newman. The holotype is kept in National Museum of Scotland, Edinburgh. The genus name is derived from the Greek πνεῦμα (pneûma), πνεύματος (pneúmatos) "air" or "breath", in reference to the inferred air-breathing habit.

== Description ==
The single, 1 cm-long fragment of P. newmani depicts small paranota (keels) high on the body, long, slender legs. There are six body segments preserved, and the dorsal portion of each segment is ornamented with a horizontal bar and three rows of roughly hexagonal bosses (bumps). Myriapods are the group that include millipedes and centipedes, and Pneumodesmus newmani would have resembled a millipede in appearance. However it did not belong to the same branch of myriapods as modern millipedes.

== Significance ==
The fossil is important because its cuticle contains openings which are interpreted as spiracles, part of a gas exchange system that would only work in air. This makes P. newmani the earliest documented arthropod with a tracheal system, and among the first known oxygen-breathing animal on land.

Trace fossils of myriapods are known dating back to the late Ordovician (the geologic period preceding the Silurian), but P. newmani may be the earliest body fossil of a myriapod, if it had been dated at 428 million years ago (Silurian, late Wenlock epoch to early Ludlow epoch). However, based on 414 million years ago (Early Devonian (Lochkovian)) estimated from Zircon age estimate, it is not the oldest myriapod, or the oldest of air-breathing terrestrial arthropods, because records from Kerrera (425 millions years ago) and Ludlow (420 millions years ago) are older. In spite of the recent competing arguments, the 2023 study suggests that this taxon is still most likely the earliest body fossil of a myriapod, with its age argued as the late Wenlock epoch (around 430 million years ago) based on the dating of the non-marine section with spores and detrital zircons. In 2024, Brookfield and colleagues study doubts this conclusion, because the analysis by Wellman et al. (2023) is not based on an adjacent, structurally separated block with different stratigraphy and sedimentology to the block with fossil site it was discovered; the authors still suggested that millipedes occupied the land during the Wenlock Epoch based on the separate millipede-bearing sediment dated to approximately 427.0 ± 4.5 million years ago. In 2025, Brookfield and colleagues further suggested that the dated section by Wellman et al. (2023) differs from the myriapod-bearing section not only in ages, but in depositional environments and bedrock sources, suggesting that the Pridoli–Lochkovian age estimate is most likely.

During the Silurian, the rocks that would later be part of Scotland were being laid down on the continent of Laurentia, in a tropical part of the Southern Hemisphere.
