= Fleurantia =

Fleurantia Temporal range: Middle Frasnian, 385–374 Ma

Scientific classification
- Domain: Eukaryota
- Kingdom: Animalia
- Phylum: Chordata
- Clade: Sarcopterygii
- Class: Dipnoi
- Family: †Fleurantiidae
- Genus: †Fleurantia; Graham-Smith & Westoll, 1937
- Species: †F. denticulata

Binomial name
- †Fleurantia denticulata Graham-Smith & Westoll, 1937

Extinct genus of fishes

Fleurantia is a genus of prehistoric marine lungfish which lived during the Devonian period of North America. It contains a single species, F. denticulata, known from several partially articulated specimens from the Escuminac Formation of Quebec, Canada. Potential remains of Fleurantia have also been recovered from the Devonian-aged Red Hill locality of Nevada, USA.
