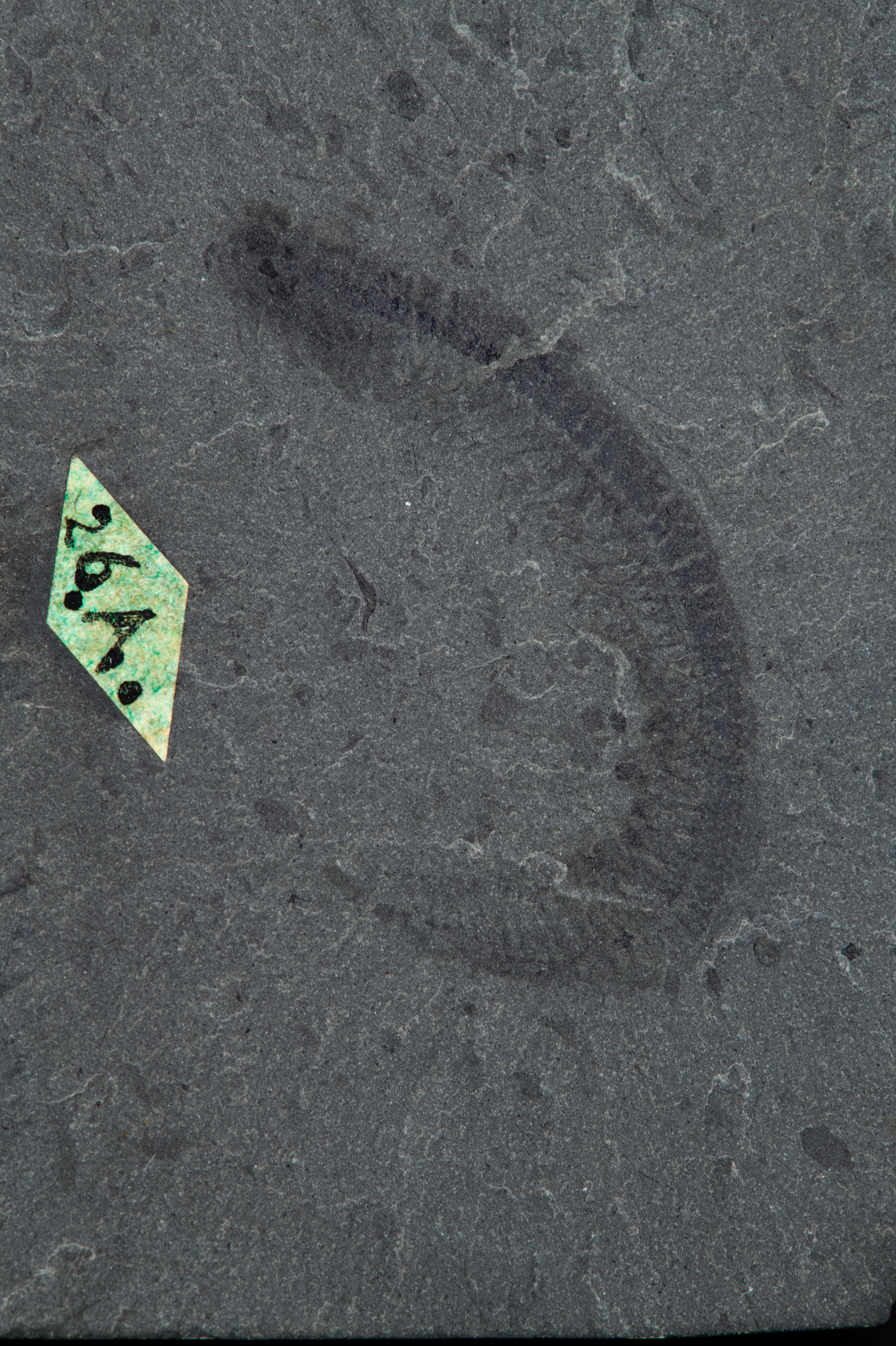
- Type specimen of W. cambria in shale

Scientific classification
- Kingdom: Animalia
- Phylum: Arthropoda
- Class: incertae sedis
- Family: †Kootenichelidae
- Genus: †Worthenella; Walcott, 1911

Type species
- Worthenella cambria Walcott, 1911

= Worthenella =

Worthenella Temporal range: Burgess Shale

Extinct genus of arthropods

Worthenella is a genus of enigmatic arthropod from the Burgess Shale. It known from a single specimen described initially as an annelid by Charles Doolittle Walcott in 1911. The body is elongate and myriapod-like with a head and at least 46 body segments. The head bears poorly preserved appendages, while filamentous branched structures appear to run along the underside of the first 34 trunk segments, with the posterior 8 suggested to have had longer appendages. In 2013, David Legg placed it in the family Kootenichelidae as a sister to Kootenichela, based on the supposed presence of antenniform head appendages. However, this position was questioned in a later study, which argued that the supposed antenniform appendages were actually taphonomic artefacts.
