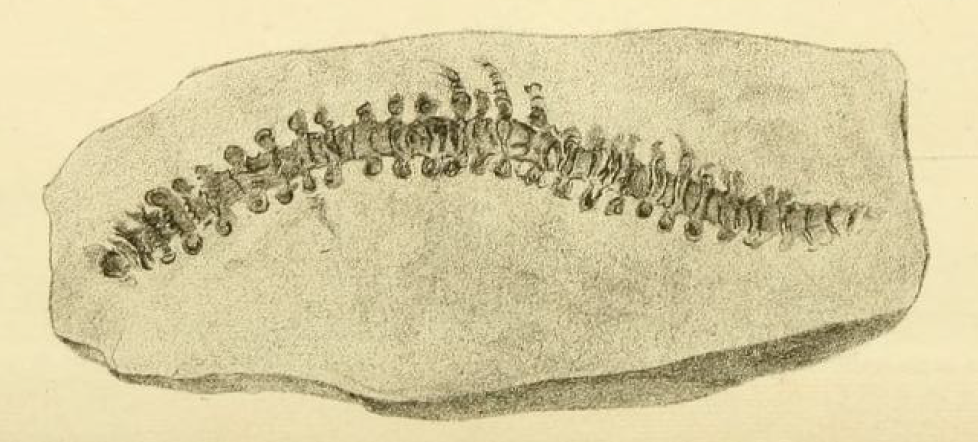
- Archidesmus

Scientific classification
- Domain: Eukaryota
- Kingdom: Animalia
- Phylum: Arthropoda
- Subphylum: Myriapoda
- Class: Diplopoda
- Superorder: †Archipolypoda
- Order: †Archidesmida; Wilson & Anderson 2004

Families
- Archidesmidae; Zanclodesmidae

= Archidesmida =

Archidesmida Temporal range: Devonian

Extinct order of millipedes

The Archidesmida is an extinct order of millipedes known from fossils from the Devonian period of Europe and North America. Archidesmidans have broad flat keels (paranota) extending from their body segments, and a modified pair of legs on the 8th segment that may have been involved in mating, similar to the gonopods of living millipedes which insert sperm into females. Alternately, the modified legs may have been used to grasp onto partners during mating.
