= Miguasha National Park =

National park in Quebec, Canada

Parc national de Miguasha
- IUCN category III (natural monument or feature)
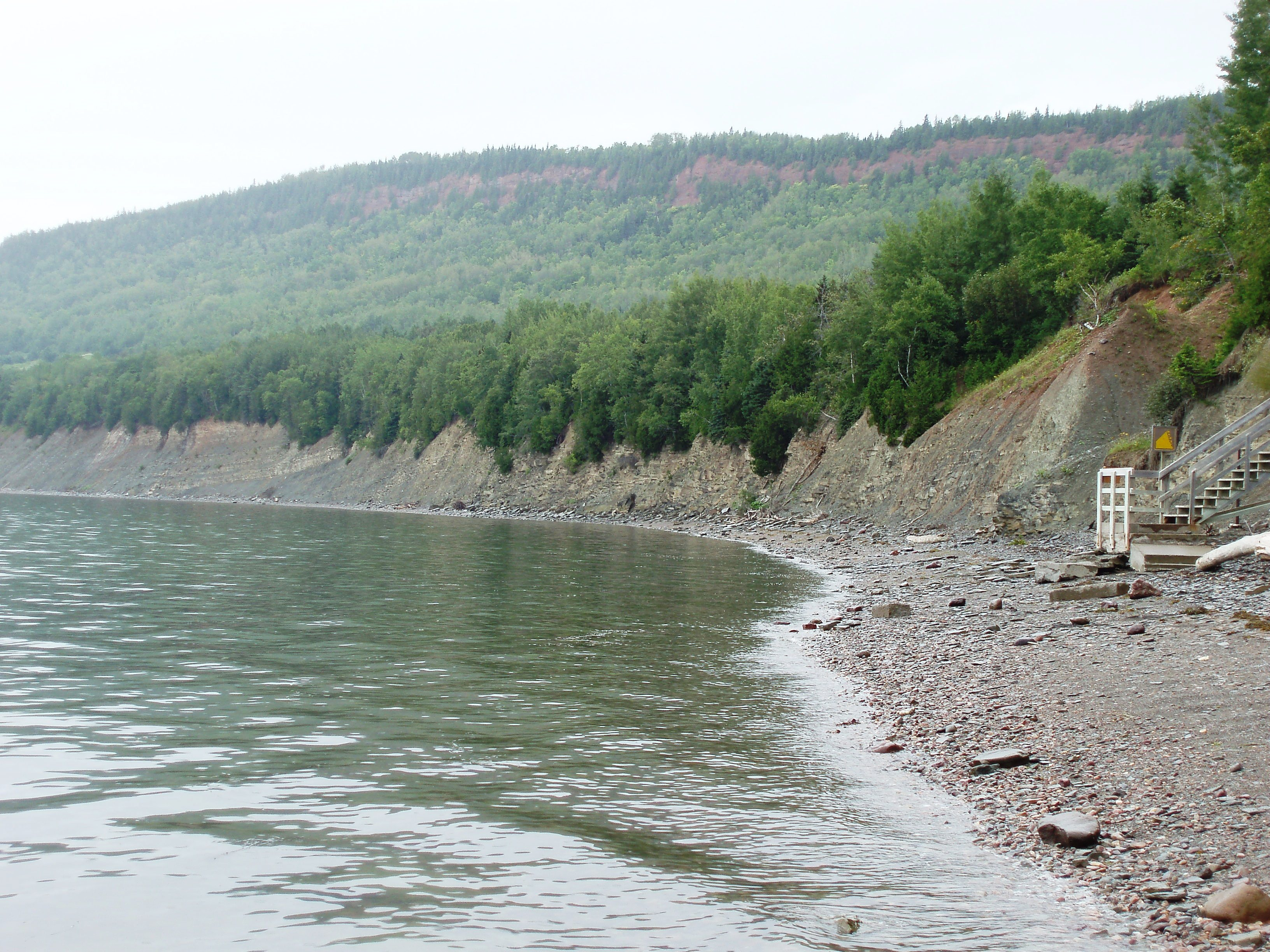
- Cliff of the Miguasha National Park

- Location within Quebec Location within Canada
- Interactive map of Parc national de Miguasha
- Location: Nouvelle, Avignon Regional County Municipality, Quebec, Canada
- Nearest city: Dalhousie, New Brunswick
- Coordinates: 48°06′38″N 66°22′10″W
- Area: 873 ha (2,160 acres)
- Established: 6 February 1985
- Governing body: SEPAQ

UNESCO World Heritage Site
- Type: Natural
- Criteria: viii
- Designated: 1999 (23rd session)
- Reference no.: 686rev
- Region: Europe and North America

Miguasha Provincial Park (French: Parc national de Miguasha) is a protected area near Carleton-sur-Mer on the Gaspé Peninsula of Quebec in Canada. Created in 1985 by the Government of Quebec, Miguasha was designated a World Heritage Site in 1999 in recognition of its wealth of fossils, which display a crucial time during the evolution of life on Earth. Other names for this site are the Miguasha Fossil Site, the Bay of Escuminac Fossil Site, the Upper Devonian Escuminac Formation, and the Hugh-Miller Cliffs. It is also sometimes referred to on fossil specimens as 'Scaumenac Bay' or 'Scaumenac Bay P.Q.'

== Miguasha Natural History Museum ==
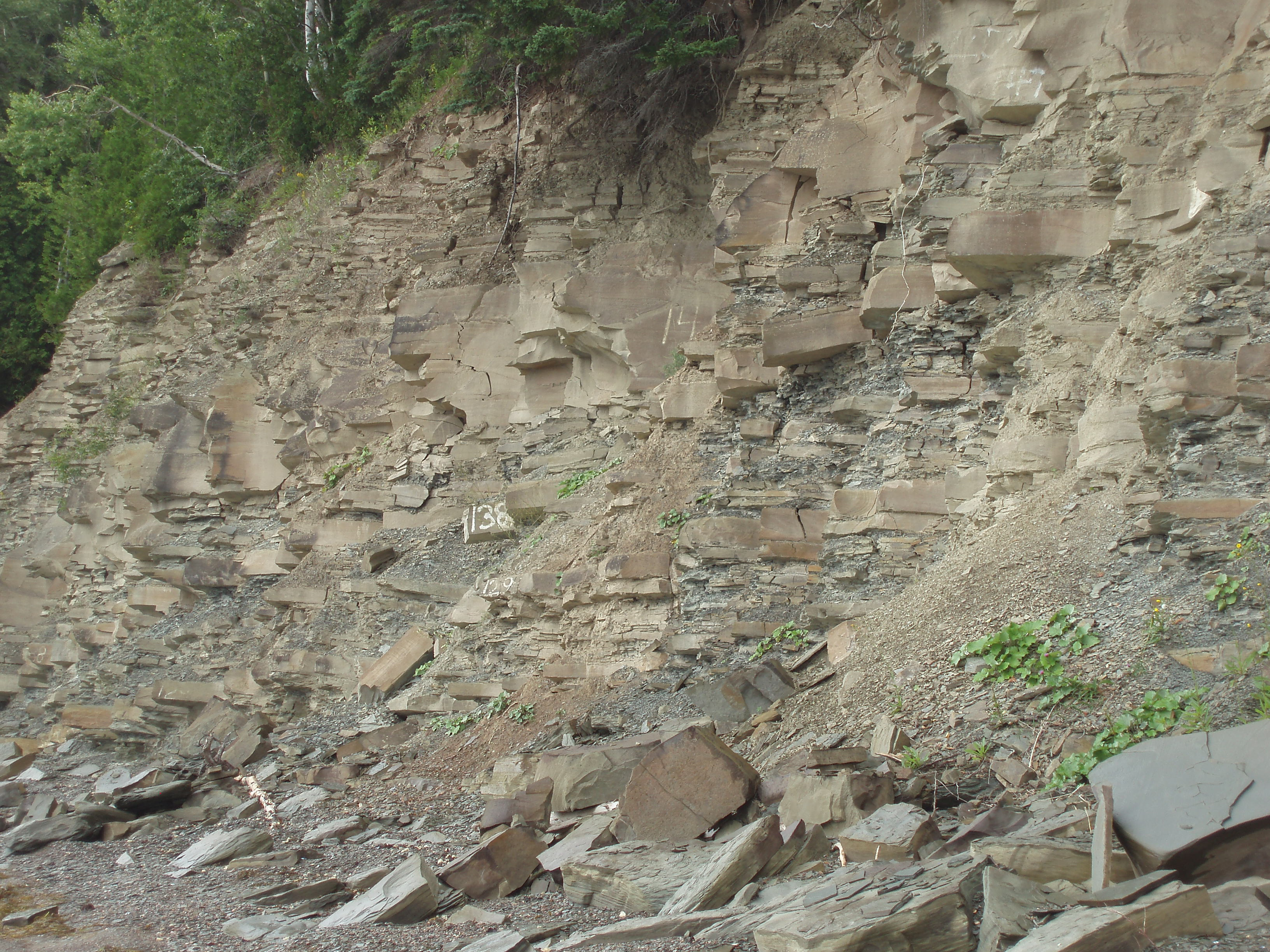
Miguasha National Park (Québec): outcrop of the Devonian beds that are rich in fossil fish.

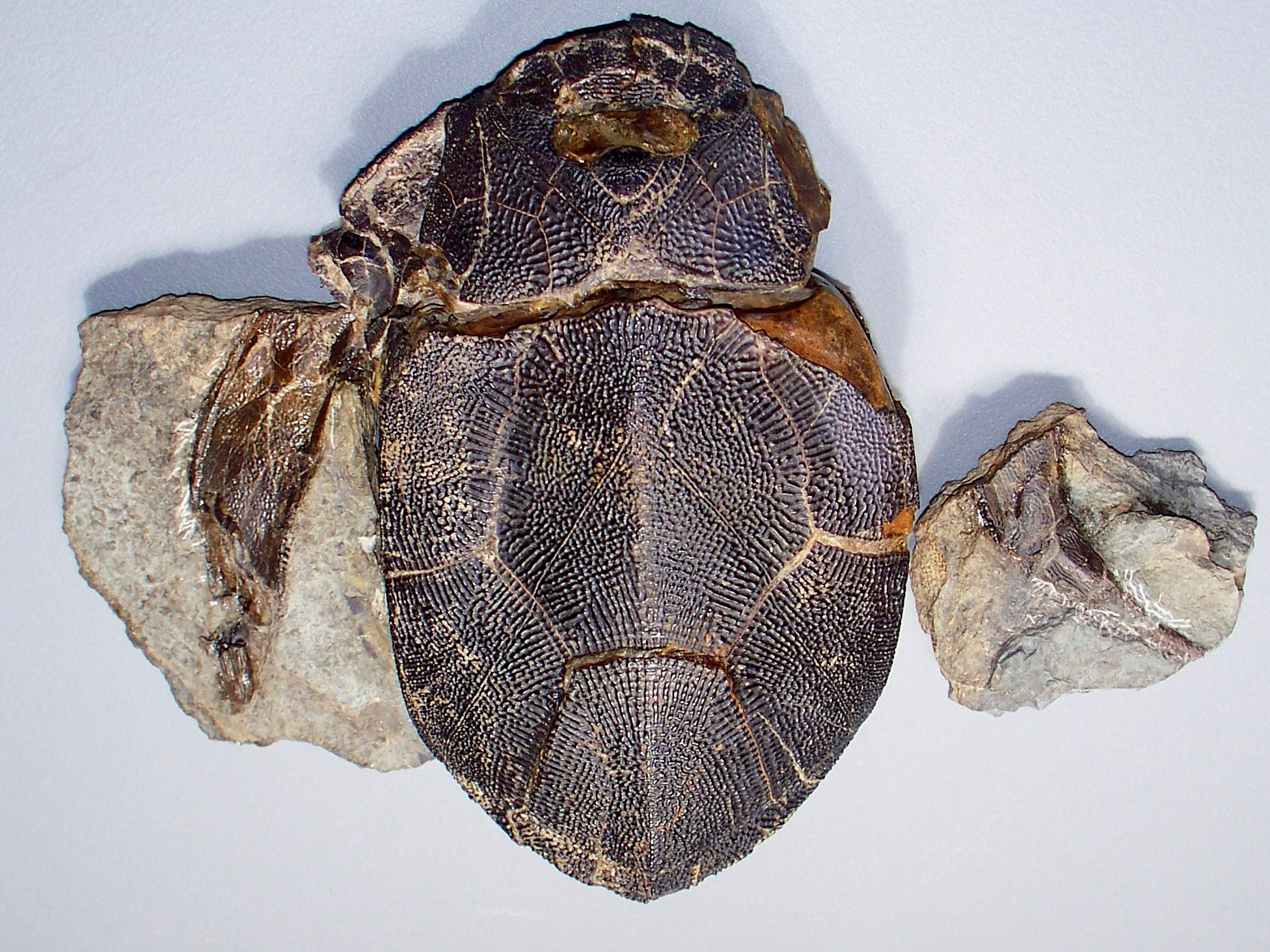
Bothriolepis, a fossil antiarch placoderm found at this site.

The park's museum features exhibits about the fossils and paleontology of the park. The museum's collection includes over 9,000 specimens of fossil fish and plants.

== Geology ==
The coastal cliffs are Upper Devonian strata of grey sedimentary rock belonging to the Escuminac Formation. They are composed of alternating layers of sandstone and shale, which are 350–375 million years old. The area today supports mainly birch, aspen, and fir forests.

== Palaeontological significance ==
Some of the fish, fauna, and spore fossils found at Miguasha are rare and ancient species. For example, Spermasporites is thought to be one of the oldest seed plant genera on Earth.

== See also ==
- List of fossil sites (with link directory)
