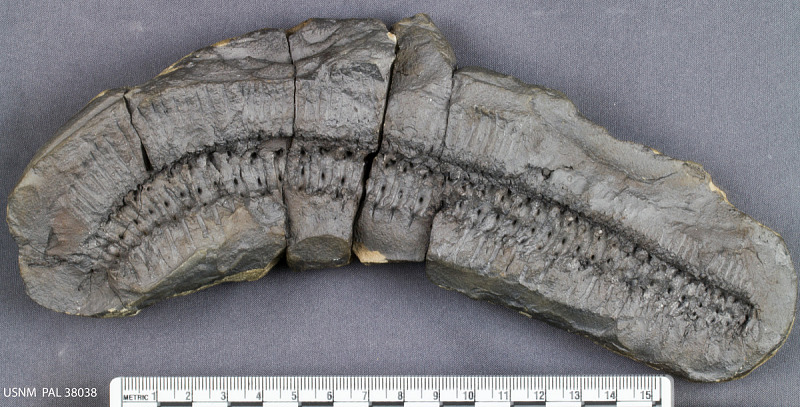
- Fossil of Acantherpestes major

Scientific classification
- Kingdom: Animalia
- Phylum: Arthropoda
- Subphylum: Myriapoda
- Class: Diplopoda
- Order: †Euphoberiida
- Family: †Euphoberiidae
- Genus: †Acantherpestes; Meek and Worthen, 1868

Type species
- Euphoberia major (Meek and Worthen, 1868)

Other species
- A. horridus (Scudder, 1882)

= Acantherpestes =

Acantherpestes Temporal range: Moscovian

Extinct genus of millipedes

Acantherpestes is an extinct genus of euphoberiid millipedes from the Pennsylvanian subperiod of the Carboniferous period. It is distinguished from other euphoberiids by its stout, laterally-directed spikes, which are curved backwards and bear an anterior ridge. It is known from the Mazon Creek fossil beds in Illinois.

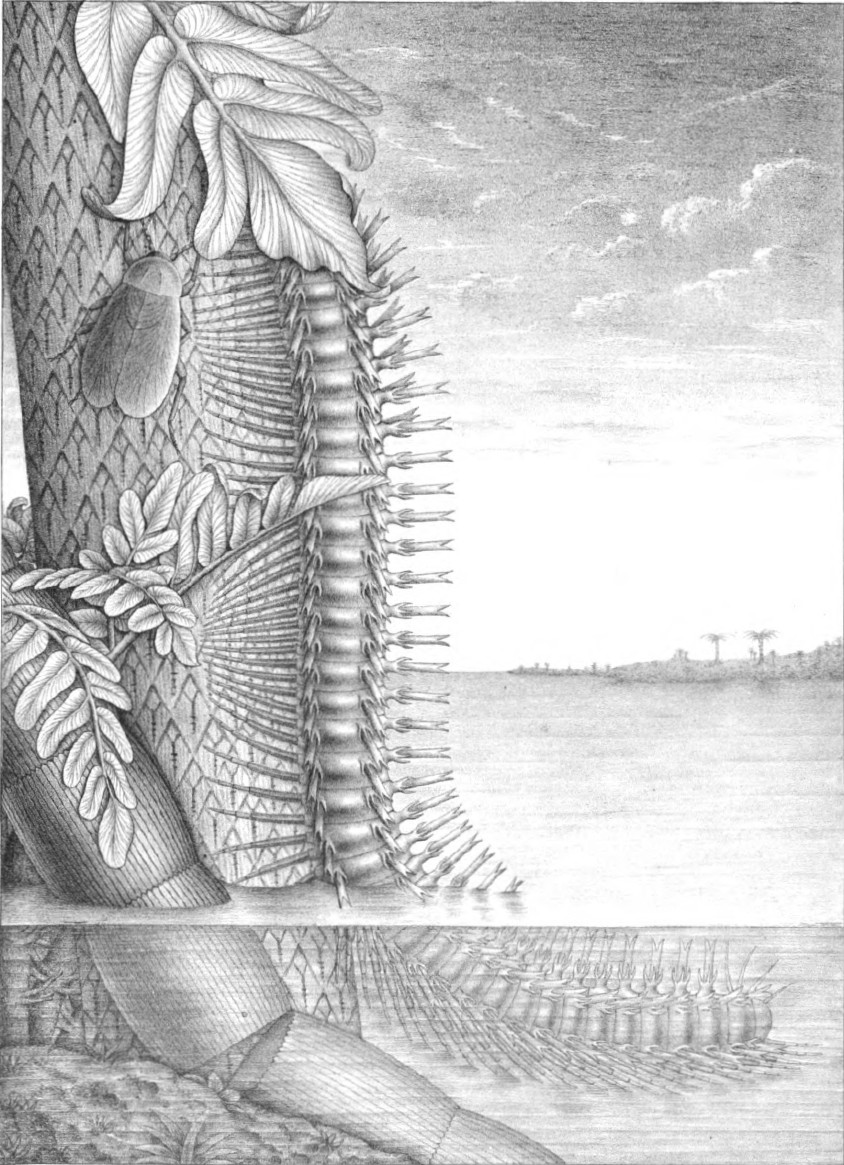
Life restoration of Acantherpestes major

Acantherpestes was a relatively large millipede, about 12 inches (30 cm) to 15 inches (38 cm) long. Paleoentomologist J.J. Burke speculated that Acantherpestes could have lived in open habitats adjacent to coal swamp forests, and that it was possibly carnivorous, but later authors have rejected the latter proposal.
