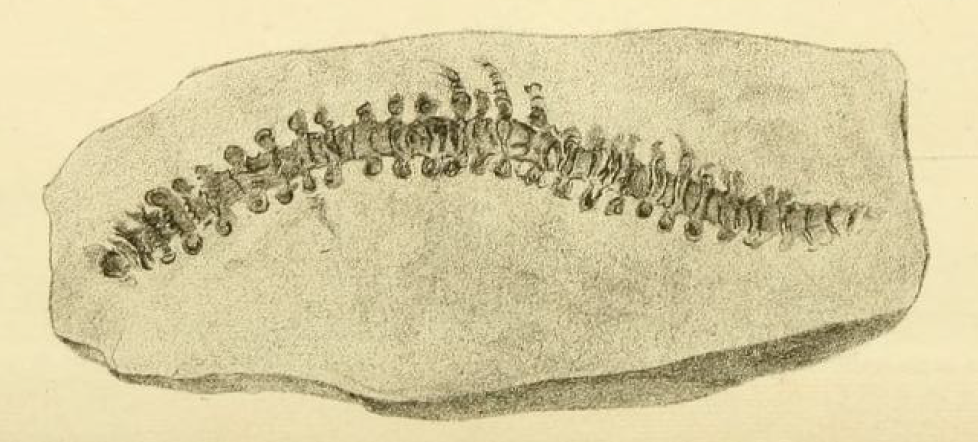
- Archidesmus macnicoli fossil illustration, anterior end is towards the left.

Scientific classification
- Kingdom: Animalia
- Phylum: Arthropoda
- Subphylum: Myriapoda
- Class: Diplopoda
- Order: †Archidesmida
- Family: †Archidesmidae; Scudder, 1885
- Genus: †Archidesmus; Peach, 1882

Type species
- Archidesmus macnicoli

Species
- A. macnicoli; A. loganensis (debated)

= Archidesmus =

Archidesmus Temporal range: Lower Devonian

Extinct genus of millipedes

Archidesmus is an extinct millipede genus from the Lower Devonian Old Red Sandstone of the United Kingdom. It is the only member of the taxonomic family Archidesmidae. Individuals were up to 5 cm (2.0 in) long, and had 60 to 80 body segments decorated with tubercles (bumps) on the upper surface, and most segments possessed wing-like keels (paranota) extending to the side. The type species Archidesmus macnicoli was described by British paleontologist Benjamin Peach in 1882. A second species, A. loganensis was also described by Peach but its status as a valid species- or even a myriapod- is debated.

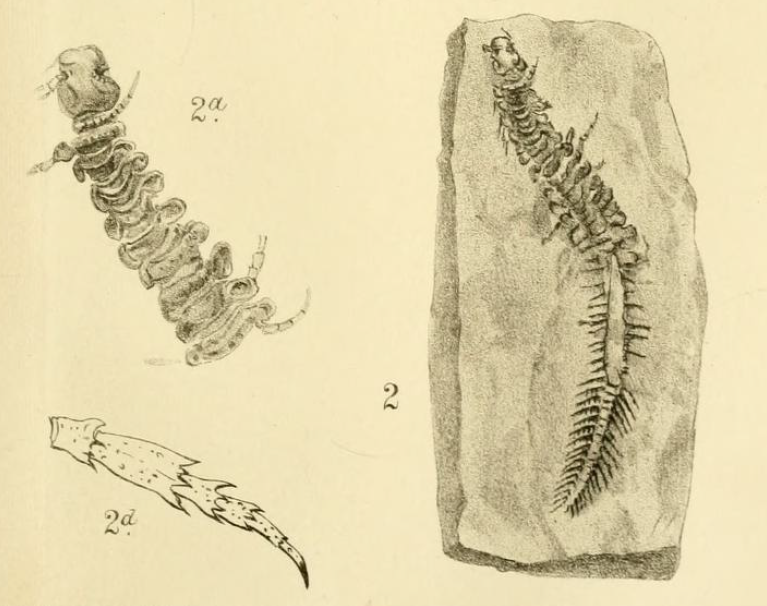
A. macnicoli illustrations
