= List of thelodont genera =

Thelodonti is a class of extinct Palaeozoic jawless fishes with distinctive scales instead of large plates of armor. Thelodonts are united in possession of "thelodont scales". This defining character is not necessarily a result of shared ancestry, as it may have been evolved independently by different groups. Thus, the thelodonts are generally thought to represent a polyphyletic group, although there is no firm agreement on this point. On the basis that they are monophyletic, they are reconstructed as being ancestrally marine and invading freshwater on multiple occasions.

== Accepted genera ==
Subclass Thelodonti – Jaekel, 1911 – 55 genera
| Name | Species | Range |
|---|---|---|
| Amaltheolepis Ørvig, 1969 | Type species: A. winseni Ørvig, 1969 Five other species: A. austfjordi Žigaitė et al., 2013; A.? baltica Karatajūtė-Talimaa, 1978; A. bystrovi Karatajūtė-Talimaa, 1978; A. montiwatsoni Žigaitė et al., 2013; A. terranovi Blom et al., 2022 | Pragian–Eifelian; Europe |
| Angaralepis Karatajūtė-Talimaa, 1997 | Type species: A. moskalenkoae (Karatajūtė-Talimaa, 1978) | Llandovery; Siberia |
| Apalolepis Karatajūtė-Talimaa, 1968 | Type species: {{{type-species}}} {{{type-authority}}}, {{{type-authority-year}}} | Latest Silurian(?)–Lochkovian (Note: The range is affected by uncertainties in the position of the Roberts Mountains Formation's Silurian–Devonian boundary.); United States |
| Archipelepis Märss, 2001 | Type species: A. turbinata Soehn, Märss, Caldwell & Wilson, 2001 One other species: A. bifurcata Märss, Wilson & Thorsteinsson, 2002 | Late Llandovery–Early Wenlock; Canada |
| Arianalepis Hairapetian, Roelofs & Trinajstic, 2016 | Type species: A. megacostata Hairapetian, Roelofs & Trinajstic, 2016 | Late Devonian; Australia, Iran |
| Australolepis Turner & Dring, 1981 | Type species: A. seddoni Turner & Dring, 1981 | Givetian–Late Devonian; Australia, Iran, Poland |
| Barlowodus Märs, Wilson & Thorsteinsson, 2002 | Type species: B. excelsus Märss, Wilson & Thorsteinsson, 2002 Two other species: B. floralis Märss, Wilson & Thorsteinsson, 2002; B. tridens Märss, Wilson & Thorsteinsson, 2002 | Lochkovian; Canada |
| Boothialepis Märss, 1999 | Type species: B. thorsteinssoni Märss, 1999 | Early Devonian; Canada |
| Boreania Karatajūtė-Talimaa, 1985 | Type species: B. minima Karatajūtė-Talimaa, 1985 | Pridoli–Lochkovian; United States, Europe |
| Canonia, | Type species: {{{type-species}}} {{{type-authority}}}, {{{type-authority-year}}} | |
| Chattertonodus Märs, Wilson & Thorsteinsson, 2002 | Type species: C. cometoides Märss, Wilson & Thorsteinsson, 2002 | Pridoli; Canada |
| Cometicercus Wilson & Caldwell, 1998 | Type species: C. cometoides Wilson & Caldwell, 1998 | Lochkovian; Canada |
| Drepanolepis Wilson & Caldwell, 1998 | Type species: D. maerssae Wilson & Caldwell, 1998 | Lochkovian; Canada |
| Eestilepis Märs, Wilson & Thorsteinsson, 2002 | Type species: E. prominens Märss, Wilson & Thorsteinsson, 2002 | Wenlock; Canada |
| Erepsilepis Märs, Wilson & Thorsteinsson, 2002 | Type species: E. margaritifera Märss, Wilson & Thorsteinsson, 2002 | Wenlock; Canada |
| Furcacauda Wilson & Caldwell, 1998 | Type species: F. heintzae (Dineley & Loeffler, 1976) One other species: F. fredholmae Wilson & Caldwell, 1998 | Lochkovian; Canada |
| Gampsolepis, | Type species: {{{type-species}}} {{{type-authority}}}, {{{type-authority-year}}} | |
| Glacialepis Märs, Wilson & Thorsteinsson, 2002 | Type species: G. corpulenta Märss, Wilson & Thorsteinsson, 2002 | Lochkovian; Canada |
| Goniporus, | Type species: {{{type-species}}} {{{type-authority}}}, {{{type-authority-year}}} | |
| Helenolepis, | Type species: {{{type-species}}} {{{type-authority}}}, {{{type-authority-year}}} | |
| Illoganellia Märs, Wilson & Thorsteinsson, 2002 | Type species: I. colossea Märss, Wilson & Thorsteinsson, 2002 | Wenlock; Canada |
| Jesslepis, | Type species: {{{type-species}}} {{{type-authority}}}, {{{type-authority-year}}} | |
| Lanarkia, | Type species: {{{type-species}}} {{{type-authority}}}, {{{type-authority-year}}} | |
| Larolepis, | Type species: {{{type-species}}} {{{type-authority}}}, {{{type-authority-year}}} | |
| Loganellia, | Type species: {{{type-species}}} {{{type-authority}}}, {{{type-authority-year}}} | |
| Longodus, | Type species: {{{type-species}}} {{{type-authority}}}, {{{type-authority-year}}} | |
| Nethertonodus, | Type species: {{{type-species}}} {{{type-authority}}}, {{{type-authority-year}}} | |
| Nikolivia, | Type species: {{{type-species}}} {{{type-authority}}}, {{{type-authority-year}}} | |
| Niurolepis, | Type species: {{{type-species}}} {{{type-authority}}}, {{{type-authority-year}}} | |
| Noturinia, | Type species: {{{type-species}}} {{{type-authority}}}, {{{type-authority-year}}} | |
| Nunavutia Märs, Wilson & Thorsteinsson, 2002 | Type species: N. fasciata Märss, Wilson & Thorsteinsson, 2002 | Ludlow; Canada |
| Oeselia, | Type species: {{{type-species}}} {{{type-authority}}}, {{{type-authority-year}}} | |
| Overia, | Type species: {{{type-species}}} {{{type-authority}}}, {{{type-authority-year}}} | |
| Paralogania, | Type species: {{{type-species}}} {{{type-authority}}}, {{{type-authority-year}}} | |
| Parathelodus, | Type species: {{{type-species}}} {{{type-authority}}}, {{{type-authority-year}}} | |
| Pezopallichthys Wilson & Caldwell, 1998 | Type species: P. ritchiei Wilson & Caldwell, 1998 | Wenlock; Canada |
| Phillipsilepis Märs, Wilson & Thorsteinsson, 2002 | Type species: P. crassa Märss, Wilson & Thorsteinsson, 2002 Two other species: P. cornuta Märss, Wilson & Thorsteinsson, 2002; P. pusilla Märss, Wilson & Thorsteinsson, 2002 | Wenlock; Canada |
| Phlebolepis, | Type species: {{{type-species}}} {{{type-authority}}}, {{{type-authority-year}}} | |
| Praetrilogania, | Type species: {{{type-species}}} {{{type-authority}}}, {{{type-authority-year}}} | |
| Sandivia, | Type species: {{{type-species}}} {{{type-authority}}}, {{{type-authority-year}}} | |
| Shielia, | Type species: {{{type-species}}} {{{type-authority}}}, {{{type-authority-year}}} | |
| Skamolepis, | Type species: {{{type-species}}} {{{type-authority}}}, {{{type-authority-year}}} | |
| Sophialepis Märs, Wilson & Thorsteinsson, 2002 | Type species: S. ancorata Märss, Wilson & Thorsteinsson, 2002 | Lochkovian; Canada |
| Sphenonectris Wilson & Caldwell, 1998 | Type species: S. turnerae Wilson & Caldwell, 1998 | Lochkovian; Canada |
| Stroinolepis, | Type species: {{{type-species}}} {{{type-authority}}}, {{{type-authority-year}}} | |
| Talimaalepis Žigaitė, 2004 | Type species: T. rimae Žigaitė, 2004 One other species: T. kadvoiensis (Karatajūtė-Talimaa, 1978) | Llandovery–Pridoli; Mongolia, Siberia |
| Talivalia Märs, Wilson & Thorsteinsson, 2002 | Type species: T. elongata (Karatajūtė-Talimaa, 1978) One other species: T. svalbardia Žigaitė et al., 2013 | Pridoli–Lower Devonian; North America, Europe |
| Thelodus, | Type species: {{{type-species}}} {{{type-authority}}}, {{{type-authority-year}}} | |
| Thulolepis, | Type species: {{{type-species}}} {{{type-authority}}}, {{{type-authority-year}}} | |
| Trimerolepis, | Type species: {{{type-species}}} {{{type-authority}}}, {{{type-authority-year}}} | |
| Turinia, | Type species: {{{type-species}}} {{{type-authority}}}, {{{type-authority-year}}} | |
| Valiukia, | Type species: {{{type-species}}} {{{type-authority}}}, {{{type-authority-year}}} | |
| Valyalepis, | Type species: {{{type-species}}} {{{type-authority}}}, {{{type-authority-year}}} | |
| Woodfjordia Žigaitė et al., 2013 | Type species: W. collisa Žigaitė et al., 2013 | Emsian; Svalbard |
| Zueguelepis, | Type species: {{{type-species}}} {{{type-authority}}}, {{{type-authority-year}}} | |

== Other genera ==
Genera from Märss et al., 2007, not present in the list above.

| Genus | Status |
|---|---|
| Bystrowia | |
| Cephalopterus | |
| Coelolepides | |
| Coelolepis | |
| Goniophorus | |
| Gonioporus | |
| Katoporodus | |
| Katoporus | |
| Loganella | Preoccupied, synonym of Loganiella |
| Logania | Preoccupied, synonym of Loganiella |
| Pachylepis | Synonym of Thelodus |
| Paraturinia | |
| Sigurdia | |
| Thelolepis | |
| Thelolepsis | |
| Turinea | |
| Zuegelepis | |
