= Andreolepis =

Andreolepis Temporal range: Pridoli ~418.7–416 Ma

Scientific classification
- Kingdom: Animalia
- Phylum: Chordata
- Clade: Osteichthyes
- Family: †Andreolepididae; Märss, 2001
- Genus: †Andreolepis; Gross, 1968

Type species
- Andreolepis hedei Gross, 1968

Species
- A. hedei Gross, 1968; A. petri Märss, 2001

Extinct genus of bony fishes

Andreolepis is an extinct genus of prehistoric fish, which lived around 420 million years ago. It was described by Walter Gross in 1968 based on scales found in the Hemse Formation in Gotland, Sweden. It is placed in the monogeneric family Andreolepididae and is generally regarded as a primitive member of the class Actinopterygii based on its ganoid scale structure; however some new research regards it as a stem group of osteichthyans.

Researchers have used microremains of an Andreolepsis to determine its origins and found that it dated back to the late Silurian.

Andreolepis was capable of shedding its teeth by basal resorption, which is considered a rather primitive mode of tooth replacement. This makes it informative about the evolution of teeth.

Fossil remains are mostly limited to scales, platelets and fragmented bones. At first only the species A. hedei was described. Scales, platelets and a spine from the Central Urals in Russia have thereafter been assigned to a new species, A. petri, due to differences in fossil morphology. Remains have been found in Russia, and A. hedei fossils have also been uncovered in the Hemse Formation of Sweden, the Himmiste Beds Formation of Estonia, Latvia, and the West Khatanzeya Formation of Nova Zemlya, Russia. Other fossils were found in Great Britain, the former of which it was originally described from. Andreolepis fossils have also recently been recovered from Western Australia and were identified as Andreolepis sp. aff. A. petri due to the resemblance to A. petri scales.

== Environment ==
Fossils of Andreolepis have been found in marine sediment, indicating that this fish lived in a marine environment, in both shallow and deeper waters. Remains of acanthodians, anaspids, heterostracans, osteostracans, thelodonts and bivalves have also been found in the same sediment layers. Examples of encountered vertebrate genera are Gomphonchus, Nostolepis, Archegonaspis, Thyestes, Paralogania, Phlebolepis and Thelodus.

== Phylogeny ==
The exact position in the phylogenetic tree is debated. Andreolepis has been considered a primitive actinopterygian, partly based on scale characteristics and the presence of ganoine, a homologue to true enamel, which was thought to be limited to actinopterygians whereas true enamel is limited to sarcopterygians. It has also been suggested to be a basal osteichthyan. For example, the teeth lack enamel and have a broad tooth field, well-developed dental organization is absent and tooth production is extraosseous, which are indications that Andreolepis is located at the base of the osteichthyes.

Gross has formerly placed Andreolepis in the family Lophosteidae, but considering the distinct differences between the genera Lophosteus and Andreolepis, the latter was placed in the new family Andreolepididae. These two genera form the oldest and most basal osteichthyans that are known thus far.

- Phylogeny of Gnathostomes
  - - Placoderms
    - - Placoderms
      - - Entelognathus
        - - - Acanthodians
            - Crown Chondrichthyes
          - - Lophosteus
            - - Andreolepis
              - Crown Osteichthyes
  Simplified Phylogeny based on Chen, D., Blom, H., Sanchez, S. et al. The stem osteichthyan Andreolepis and the origin of tooth replacement. Nature 539, 237–241 (2016).

== Evolutionary significance ==
=== Squamation and scale characteristics ===
The scales of Andreolepis have a rhombic shape and contain a thin monolayer of ganoine. The squamation pattern has been divided into ten morphotypes, each presumably covering a distinct section of the body. However, some variation in scale morphology might be due to different developmental stages and different species, as no distinction was made between A. hedei and A. petri when reconstructing the squamation. Peg-and-socket articulation of the scales is already present in this basal fish genus and its scales are reminiscent of those of actinopterygian scales in early developmental stages, which indicates that developmental heterochrony might have been a mechanism by which differences in scale morphology evolved.

=== Tooth replacement and evolution of enamel ===
Previously it was thought that the dentary of Andreolepis did not contain true teeth, but instead harbored denticles. The lack of teeth and the recognition of initial denticle organisation suggested a basal phylogenetic position within the osteichthyes. It was even argued that the presumed dentary fossil of A. hedei is uninformative of dental evolution, as the fossil did not represent dental development, but rather development of the dermal skeleton. This would mean the tooth-like structures of Andreolepis neither match with teeth of chondrichthyans nor with those of osteichthyans and are more similar to the development of structures in dermal scales. Recently it was shown that A. hedei did have functional teeth that were shed by basal-resorption, something that was overlooked during previous research efforts due to methodological limitations.

The location of the resorption cups, places where resorption of the tooth base took place, and newly formed teeth are not perfectly aligned, which suggests a flexible form of tooth replacement. Nonetheless, some form of patterning can be recognised in the teeth. Multiple layers of resorption cups have been found, which means shedding by resorption could take place multiple times. The presence of a primitive form of tooth development in the most basal osteichthyans sheds light on the manner by which this has evolved.

Fossils including those of Andreolepis together with genetic inferences also helped to elucidate the evolution of enamel. The scales of Andreolepis contain the enamel homologue ganoine, but the dermal bones and teeth don't. Moving up in the phylogenetic tree, more derived extinct and extant species show a shift of enamel-containing structures from the scales, to the dermal plate and eventually the teeth, with enamel lost in dermal teeth-like structures and in some cases even in the teeth of the most derived groups of tetrapods and teleosts. This might indicate that enamel first evolved on dermal tissues like scales and only later in teeth.
