= Erepsilepis =

Erepsilepis Temporal range: Early Silurian

Scientific classification
- Kingdom: Animalia
- Phylum: Chordata
- Infraphylum: Agnatha
- Class: †Thelodonti
- Order: †Phlebolepidiformes
- Family: †Phlebolepididae
- Genus: †Erepsilepis

Species
- †Erepsilepis margaritifera Märss et al., 2002

Extinct genus of jawless fishes

Erepsilepis is an extinct thelodont agnathan genus in the family Phlebolepididae.

Scales of Erepsilepis are robust and abrasion-resistant, at least on one side of the body. Sharks which live among rough substrates such as rocky caves or reefs have abrasion-resistant scales across their entire body, while those which forage on soft sandy or muddy substrates tend to concentrate these kinds of scales on their belly.

== See also ==
- List of prehistoric jawless fish genera
- List of thelodont genera
