= Palaeodus =

Scientific classification
- Kingdom: Animalia
- Phylum: Chordata
- Infraphylum: Agnatha
- Class: †Thelodonti
- Order: †Thelodontiformes
- Family: †Palaeodontidae
- Genus: †Palaeodus; Rohon, 1890

Type species
- Palaeodus brevis

Extinct genus of jawless fishes

Palaeodus is an extinct genus of thelodont agnathan that lived during the Lower Ordovician period near present-day Saint Petersburg, Russia.
