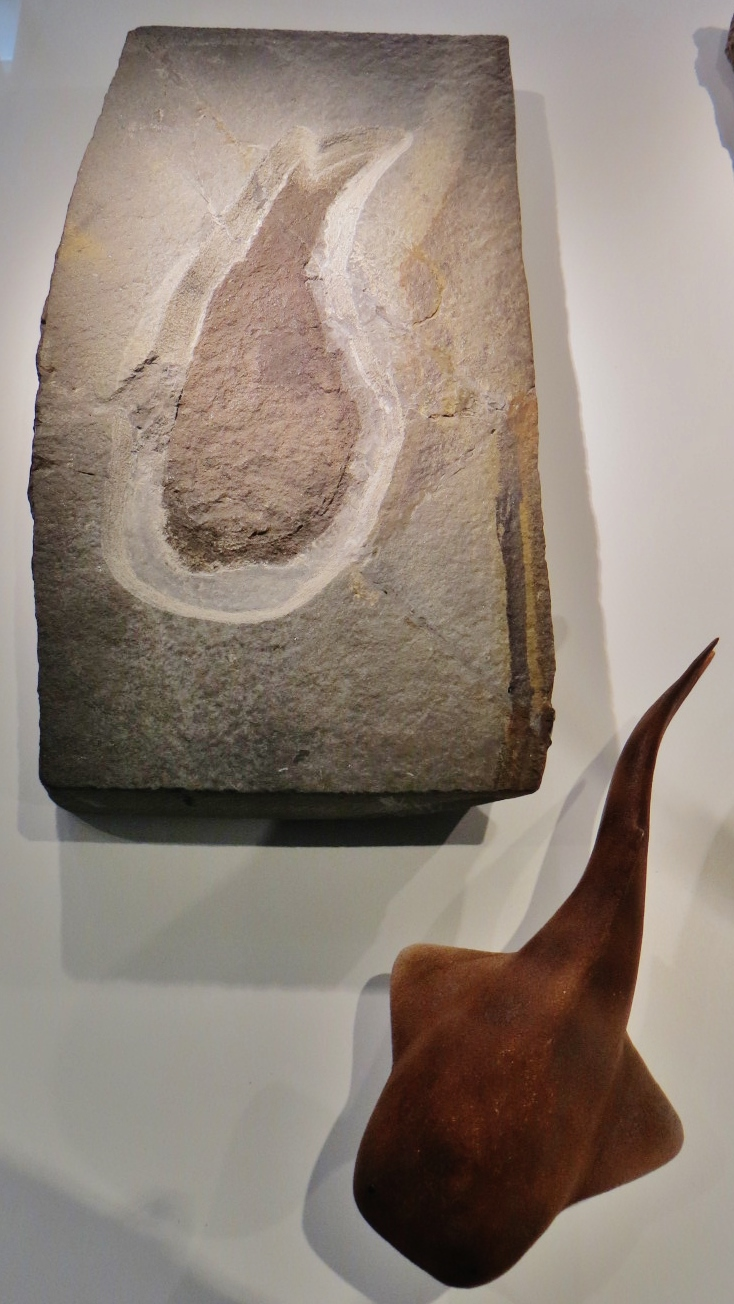
- Loganellia scotica (Fossil and model, Museum am Löwentor, Stuttgart)

Scientific classification
- Kingdom: Animalia
- Phylum: Chordata
- Infraphylum: Agnatha
- Class: †Thelodonti
- Order: †Thelodontiformes
- Family: †Loganelliidae; Karatajūtė-Talimaa 1997

Synonyms
- Loganiidae Karatajūtė-Talimaa 1978

= Loganelliidae =

Loganelliids

Family of jawless vertebrates

Loganelliidae is an extinct family of thelodonts in the order Thelodontiformes. They are distinguished by the star or cross shaped ridges located on their head scales.

== Morphology ==
The head scales possess cross shaped or star shaped ridges, transitional scales are rhomboidal, and trunk scales are horizontally elongated. The crown is notably posteriorly pointed, with the apex extending beyond the base. The main crown surface is flat and smooth, and can be inclined in either horizontal direction. The base of the crown possesses a short spine which points downwards and anteriorly.

== Classification ==
The family contains the following genera:

- †Angaralepis
- †Illoganellia
- †Larolepis
- †Loganellia
- †Nunavutia
- †Sandivia
- †Stroinolepis
- †Talimaalepis
- †Valyalepis
