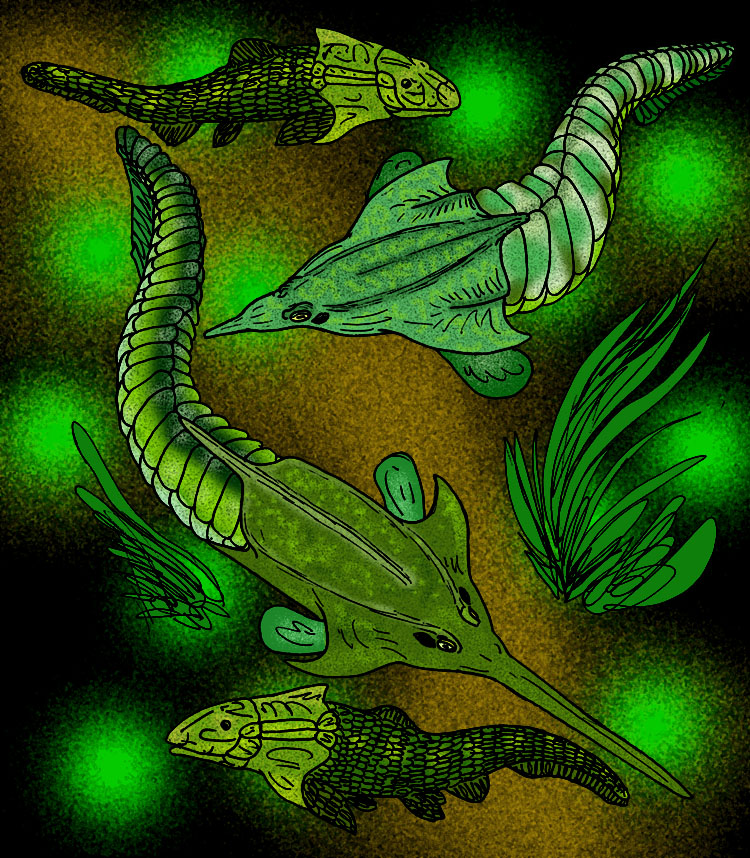
- Reconstruction of Neeyambaspis enigmatica and Pituriaspis doylei.

Scientific classification
- Kingdom: Animalia
- Phylum: Chordata
- Infraphylum: Agnatha
- Class: †Pituriaspida; Young 1991
- Order: †Pituriaspidiformes
- Family: †Pituriaspididae

Genera
- †Pituriaspis; †Neeyambaspis

Synonyms
- Neeyambaspididae Davis 1994

= Pituriaspida =

Pituriaspida Temporal range: 393.3–382.7 Ma Middle Devonian

Extinct family of jawless fishes

The Pituriaspida ('Pituri-shield' or 'hallucinogen-shield') are a small group of extinct armored jawless fishes with tremendous nose-like rostrums, which lived in the marine, deltaic environments of Middle Devonian Australia (about 393.3—382.7 Ma). They are known only by two species, Pituriaspis doylei and Neeyambaspis enigmatica found in a single sandstone location of the Georgina Basin, in Western Queensland, Australia.

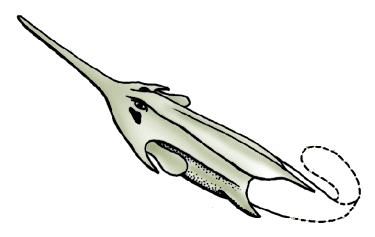
The mouth, gill openings and presumably the nasal aperture were all situated on the ventral side of the head. Well-developed paired fins attached on either sides of the headshield. The only diagnostic feature of pituriaspids is an enigmatic pit adjacent to the eyes. – Philippe Janvier

"Pituriaspida" is often translated as 'hallucinogenic shield.' Pituri is a hallucinogenic drug, made from the leaves of the Corkwood Tree and Acacia ash, and used by local Aborigine shamans for vision quests. The pituriaspids' discoverer, Dr Gavin Young, named Pituriaspis after the drug because, upon examining the first specimens, he suspected he was hallucinating (Long, p 59). The better studied species - Pituriaspis doylei, which had a superficial resemblance to the Osteostraci, had an elongate headshield, that, coupled with its spear-like rostrum, gave it a throwing-dart-like appearance. Neeyambaspis enigmatica had a much smaller and shorter rostrum, and a more triangular headshield, making it look as though it were a guitar pick with a tail.

Phylogeny of jawless fish after Reeves and colleagues, 2023:

- Vertebrata total group
  - †Haikouella
  - - †Metaspriggina
    - †Myllokunmingiida
    - Vertebrata crown group
      - Cyclostomi total group
        - †Anaspida
          - †Birkeniida
          - - †Lasanius
            - - †Jamoytius
              - †Euphanerops
        - - †Euconodonta
          - Cyclostomi crown group
            - Myxinoidea
            - Petromyzontida
      - Gnathostomata total group
        - †Pteraspidomorphi
          - †Astraspis
          - - †Arandaspida
            - †Heterostraci
        - - †Thelodonti
            - †Furcacaudiformes
            - †Thelodontiformes
          - - †Pituriaspida
            - - †Galeaspida
              - - †Osteostraci
                - Gnathostomata (traditional usage)
                  - †Antiarchi
                  - - †Arthrodira
                    - Gnathostomata crown group
                      - Osteichthyes
                      - Chondrichthyes
