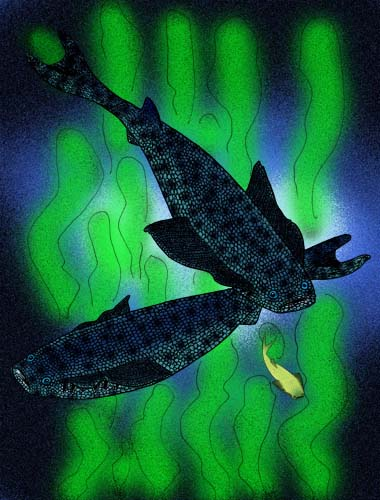
- Comparison of Thelodus (large dark thelodonts) and Loganellia (small yellow thelodont)

Scientific classification
- Kingdom: Animalia
- Phylum: Chordata
- Infraphylum: Agnatha
- Class: †Thelodonti
- Order: †Thelodontiformes
- Family: †Coelolepidae; Pander, 1856

Type genus
- †Coelolepis

Genera
- †Parathelodus; †Thelodus

= Coelolepidae =

Extinct family of jawless fishes

Coelolepidae is an extinct family of thelodont vertebrate agnathans that lived during the Silurian. Some authors prefer to call this family Thelodontidae.
