= Tiiu Märss =

Estonian geologist and palaeoichthyologist

Tiiu Märss (until 1970, Tiiu Noppel, born October October 1943, in Elva) is an Estonian geologist and palaeoichthyologist.

== Education and scientific career ==
Märss attended Uderna Primary School in 1951–1953 and Tallinn 16th Secondary School in 1953–1963. She studied geology at Tartu State University in 1965–1970 (passing practical courses in Estonia, Crimea and East Pamir) and obtained the qualification of geological engineer in the field of geological mapping and prospecting for mineral resources. Her diploma work was titled ‘Vertebrate distribution in the Silurian of Estonia’. In 1973–1976, she was a postgraduate student of palaeontology and stratigraphy in the Institute of Geology of the Academy of Sciences of the ESSR (since 1989 Estonian Academy of Sciences). In 1983, she defended the Candidate of Sciences thesis ‘The Silurian vertebrates of Estonia and West Latvia’ and was awarded the degree of the Candidate of Geological-Mineralogical Sciences, equivalent to a PhD, in 1984.

The work of Märss has mainly been tied with the Institute of Geology of the Estonian Academy of Sciences, where she held the following positions: 1963–1965 technician and senior technician; 1970–1973, engineer; 1976–1985, junior scientist; 1985–2006, 2009–2013, senior scientist; 2006–2007 leading scientist; 2008, extraordinary senior scientist; 2014–2015, palaeontology specialist working on palaeontological collections. During 1980–1986, she lectured on micropalaeontology at the Department of Geology of the University of Tartu and in 1993–1995, she gave a special course on Silurian and Devonian vertebrate palaeontology at the same university. In 2011–2013, T. Märss worked as a project manager at the Estonian Maritime Institute of the University of Tartu and in 2015–2016 as an ichthyologist. She has studied fish at the National Museum of Scotland in Edinburgh, Natural History Museum in London, the Department of Biological Sciences at the University of Alberta, Canada, as well in the Australian Museum in Sydney and the Chinese Geological Museum in Beijing.

In 2017–2024, she continued her research on Palaeozoic and modern fishes at the Institute of Geology of Tallinn University of Technology as a freelancer.

== Membership ==
Märss has been or is a member of the following organizations and institutions: 1975–1990, member of the All-Union Palaeontological Society (VPO); 1990–present, corresponding member of the Subcommission on Silurian Stratigraphy of the International Union of Geological Sciences (IUGS); 1999–2008, member of the Scientific Council of the Institute of Geology, Tallinn University of Technology; 2007–2015, member of the Scientific Board of the International Geoscience Programme (IGCP); 2008–2010, member of the Baltic Stratigraphical Association.

== Managerial and administrative work ==
Märss has been a grant holder of several research projects of the Estonian Science Foundation (ESF): 1995–1996, ESF grant 1666: Biozonal schemes of Silurian vertebrates; 1997–1999, ESF grant 2854: Evolutionary lineages of Silurian conodonts and early vertebrates, and high resolution stratigraphy; 2000–2002, ESF grant 4160: Early vertebrates (conodonts, agnathans, fishes) of Paadla age in the Palaeobaltic; 2004–2007, ESF grant 5726: Vertebrates of the Palaeobaltic Sea: taxonomy, phylogeny and distribution in the Silurian and Devonian 2008–2010, ESF grant 7334: Ultrasculpture on the exoskeleton of recent fishes, and its value in the taxonomy and systematics of fishes.

She has been active in the following international projects on early vertebrates: 1990–1995, leader of the Silurian Working Group of the International Geoscience Programme (IGCP) Project 328 ‘Palaeozoic microvertebrates’; 1996–2000, co-leader of the IGCP Project 406 ‘Circum-Arctic Lower-Middle Palaeozoic vertebrate palaeontology and biostratigraphy’; 2003–2007, Estonian representative and leader of the Working Group on thelodont study of the IGCP Project 491 ‘Middle Palaeozoic vertebrate biogeography, palaeogeography and climate’.

She has co-supervised licentiate and doctoral dissertations on the Silurian fishes.

== Research work ==
Märss has studied Silurian and Lower Devonian early vertebrates, agnathans and gnathostomes. Her interest in fossil vertebrates arose and deepened through the geology projects of undergraduate students (1967, 1969), graduation (diploma) work (1970) at Tartu State University and in studies for the Candidate of Sciences thesis (PhD) in the Institute of Geology (1983). Her research has enriched knowledge on early vertebrate morphology and histology, taxonomy, phylogeny and spatio-temporal distribution and significantly improved the picture on the diversity of Silurian marine biota on Earth.

For the time, experts of other faunal groups and lithologists were involved in studies of various aspects of vertebrates (see the list of publications). Nearly 200 scientific papers have been published, including three monographs and four monographic papers.

== Collection of research material outside Estonia ==
As an expert on Silurian fishes and for the purpose of collecting fossils, Märss has participated in geological expeditions in the Baltic countries, western Ukraine, the Central Ural (Russia), Great Britain (England, Wales and Scotland), NW Territories of Canada (Mackenzie Mountains) and Arctic islands (Baillie-Hamilton and Cornwallis). Fish material from the Severnaya and Novaya Zemlya archipelagos was provided in her studies was provided by Estonian, Lithuanian and Russian colleagues.

Märss has taken part in the Middle Devonian fish excavations in Essi and Karksi outcrops, Estonia, and Upper Devonian Lode quarry, Latvia.

She has also obtained Silurian and Lower Devonian rock samples and vertebrate material during her shorter trips, mainly to the international geological meetings in Komi in Russia, Gotland Island and Skåne region of Sweden, Ringerike area of Norway, Holy Cross Mountains of Poland, Bohemia in Czechia, Thuringia in Germany, Austrian Alps, SW of Spain and Portugal, Eastern Canada, in several USA states and Parana River Basin in Brazil.

A total of about 3800 samples for palaeoihthyological study have been collected and processed by Märss from Estonia and elsewhere, partly together with her colleagues.

== Morphology, taxonomy and systematics of early vertebrates ==
As a result of her individual or co-authored studies, Märss has established 167 new vertebrate and 4 invertebrate taxa with a focus on the Silurian agnathan thelodonts, osteostracans, heterostracans, and on the gnathostome acanthodians, chondrichthyans and osteichthyans. On the basis of the morphological and histological features, as well as the sculpture of the exoskeletal elements (shields, plates, tesserae, scales, etc.), two new Silurian vertebrate faunas have been identified, one in the Canadian Arctic islands and the other in the Russian Arctic. One new thelodont family, genus and species (Eestilepididae, Eestilepis prominens) from Cornwallis Island, Arctic Canada, is named after Estonia.

Märss was the first to map the squamation of the articulated thelodont Phlebolepis elegans from Himmiste-Kuigu quarry, Saaremaa, Estonia. Later on, similar work was conducted on thelodonts from Scotland and Cornwallis and Baillie-Hamilton islands, Arctic Canada.

She reconstructed the sensory-line canal system of Phlebolepis elegans and showed its similarity with the sensory-line system of another agnathan group, cyathaspidid heterostracans, attesting their close relationships.

The branchial openings of Phlebolepis elegans and denticles covering the buccal, pharyngeal and branchial areas, also found in modern cartilaginous fish, were described for the first time by Märss and her co-author.

She also discovered a second pair of paired fins in the thelodont Shielia taiti, which was an important finding in elucidating the formation and phylogeny of fins of early vertebrates.

== Taphonomy and biostratigraphy ==
Relying on the sedimentary rock material from outcrops and numerous drill cores, Märss has proved that most of the known Silurian agnathans and fish dwelled in marine environments, refuting the widespread opinion of their freshwater habitats. In order to study the unique burial and preservation conditions of articulated squamations of Phlebolepis elegans in the Palaeobaltic Sea, she used the material from Himmiste-Kuigu quarry collected by A. Luha in 1929. Together with lithologists, she found out that a shoal of thelodonts died in a shallow depression on the bottom of the lagoon behind the reef belt towards the land; the depression acted as a trap during low tide. Unfavourable conditions, primarily the lack of oxygen in warm and shallow water, caused the perishing of the Phlebolepis shoal. Very low wave activity prevented postmortem disintegration of the squamations, and rapid conservation in mud saved the exoskeletons from scattering.

Märss has devoted great attention to the use of agnathans and fish scales in the subdivision and correlation of sedimentary rocks of the Silurian sea basins. As the author of the Regional Vertebrate Biozonal Scheme, she initiated the creation of the Global Silurian Vertebrate Biozonal Scheme, which has since been widely used in the biostratigraphic works of many authors. She proved that new vertebrate taxa appeared during the transgressive phases of the development of the Palaeobaltic Sea and identified the levels of bioevents in the distribution of Silurian vertebrates.

Following the research methodology employed in Estonia, Märss was the first among the international geologists investigating the Canadian Arctic islands (Baillie-Hamilton and Cornwallis) to simultaneously use the distribution data of several faunal groups (fishes, conodonts, ostracodes, brachiopods) and the results of isotope studies to solve the stratigraphical issues. In addition to fossil distribution in the Silurian and Lower Devonian, the carbon isotope curves of geological sections of these islands were compared with those of the Baltic and the Central Ural ones, similar curve patterns were found, and these distant sections were correlated.

== Microichthyological research of modern fishes ==
Märss and her working team at the Estonian Marine Institute of the University of Tartu and Alberta University have studied modern fishes from the Baltic Sea with initial interest in comparing their small ossicles with skeletal elements of fossil fish. They started in 2008 with examining the morphology and sculpture of scales and their modifications in Baltic scorpaeniforms, gasterosteiforms and pleuronectiforms. Later, however, they focused on a comparative study of fish teeth and gill-rakers, which have very different morphologies in different taxa and are valuable in characterizing species but could also be used in establishing new ones. Märss has started similar research also on clupeiforms. With such work she laid the foundation of microichthyological studies in Estonia.

== Popular-scientific work ==
Märss has presented her research findings to a wider readership in the Estonian journals Eesti Loodus, Loodusesõber and some special publications. She has provided entries on Saaremaa cliffs for Estonian Encyclopaedia and booklets in the Estonian, Finnish and English languages, as well as photos for local magazines Horisont and Eesti Loodus. She has shown Silurian fishes at exhibitions and compiled texts for posters on Saaremaa cliffs. Märss has guided numerous excursions to famous palaeontological sites in Silurian outcrops on Saaremaa Island.

== Nature preservation ==
In 1991, Märss provided the characterization of the cliffs situated in The West Estonian Archipelago Biosphere Reserve Area with the proposition of establishing the Silurian Reef Belt Protection Area on the northern coast of the western Estonian islands. She was of the opinion that the extensive and unique reef zone of the Early Silurian Jaagarahu Age described by E. Klaamann and R. Einasto deserved to be protected under the nature conservation laws of Estonia. This proposal was not realized but the descriptions of objects were used in the Estonian Primeval Nature Book. She compiled identification cards for more than 40 Saaremaa cliffs and outcrops important for the Silurian palaeontology and stratigraphy, representing type sections of certain stratigraphic units and sites of special fossils. The descriptions of the bedrock objects (cliffs, outcrops) of the Primeval Nature Book have been entered in the Estonian Nature Information System (EELIS).

== Recognition ==
- 2002 - PalSIRP Sepkoski Grant of the US Paleontological Society for her research Ultrasculpture on the exoskeleton of early agnathans and fishes (Priscum, The Newsletter of the Paleontological Society, 2002, Vol. 11, No. 2).
- 2005 - The Estonian National Science Award in geological and biological sciences for the research cycle Evolution and distribution of Mid Palaeozoic vertebrates in the seas of the Northern Hemisphere and their practical value in geology.
- 2022 - The 16th International Symposium on Early and Lower Vertebrates in Valencia, Spain (20–28 June 2022) was devoted to Tiiu Märss and Philippe Janvier.

A thelodont (Drepanolepis maerssae Wilson & Caldwell, 1998), an acanthodian (Poracanthodes marssae Valiukevičius, 2004) and an ostracode (Beyrichia (Beyrichia) marssae Miller, Williams & Siveter, 2010) have been named after Märss.

== Personalia ==
Tiiu Märss. Eesti Geoloogia. Biograafiline Teatmik [Estonian Geology. Biographic Directory] (compiler A. Aaloe)]. Eesti Geoloogia Selts, Tallinn, 1995, p. 74, 141.

Märss (Noppel), Tiiu. Eesti geoloogiateadlasi. Maa Universumis. Möödanik, tänapäev, and Tulevik [Scientists of Estonian Geology]. Earth is in the Universe. [The past, present, and future.] (compilers: H. Nestor, A. Raukas, R. Veskimäe). Tallinn, 2004, p. 317.

Eesti Vabariigi Teaduspreemiad 2005. [The Science Awards of the Republic of Estonia]. Tallinn, 2005, pp. 86–97.

Kukk, T. 2005. Eestit tuntakse Siluri kalade ja nende uurija järgi [Estonia is known after Silurian fish and their researcher: interview with Tiiu Märss]. Eesti Loodus, 4, pp. 34–38. ISSN 0131-5862.

Tiiu Märss. Eesti Geoloogia. Biograafiline Teatmik [Estonian Geology. Biographic Directory] (compiler A. Aaloe)]. Eesti Geoloogia Selts, Tallinn, 2016, p. 141, 277.

Martínez-Pérez, C., Ferrón, H. & Botella, H. 2023. Tribute to Tiiu Märss and Philippe Janvier (16th International Symposium on Early and Lower Vertebrates). Spanish Journal of Palaeontology 38, 1, p. 1–2. doi:10.7203/sjp.26864

== Personal life ==
Märss was influenced by the high spirituality of Uderna Primary School, and, in her home village of Hellenurme, by stories about nature studies and expeditions to Siberia and the Arctic Ocean conducted by famous explorer and scientist Alexander von Middendorff, the former owner of Hellenurme manor.

The granduncle of Märss, Juhan (Johannes) Kartau was a member of the Constituent Assembly (1919–1920) and the first Minister of Education of the Republic of Estonia in Otto Strandman’s first government (1919)

Her husband, Jaan Märss, the metal conservator at the Tallinn City Museum, was awarded a medal for his restoration and heritage protection works (2008); the Museum-Rat Prize (2014) and the award for his lifetime achievements (2021)

Märss has two children.

== Selected publications ==
=== Monographs and monographic papers ===
- Märss, T. 1986. Silurian vertebrates of Estonia and West Latvia. Tallinn, Valgus, 104 pp. [In Russian with English summary]. https://files.geocollections.info/b7b6e2a0-6f6b-4a80-8fb8-2a5be139b891.pdf
- Märss, T., & Ritchie, A. 1998 (for 1997). Articulated thelodonts (Agnatha) of Scotland. Transactions of the Royal Society of Edinburgh: Earth Sciences, 88, 143–195. doi:10.1017/S026359330000691X
- Blom, H., Märss, T., & Miller, G. C. 2002 (for 2001). Silurian and earliest Devonian birkeniid anaspids from the Northern Hemisphere. Transactions of the Royal Society of Edinburgh: Earth Science, 92, 263–323. doi:10.1017/S0263593300000250
- Märss, T., Wilson, M. V. H. & Thorsteinsson, R. 2006. Silurian and Lower Devonian thelodonts and putative chondrichthyans from the Canadian Arctic Archipelago. Special Papers in Palaeontology, 75, 144 pp. doi:10.1017/S0016756807003615
- Märss, T., Turner, S., & Karatajtė-Talimaa, V. 2007. “Agnatha” II. Thelodonti. In: H.-P. Schultze (ed.). Handbook of Paleoichthyology. Vol. 1B. Verlag Dr. Friedrich Pfeil, München, 143 pp. ISBN 978-3-89937-081-2
- Märss, T., Afanassieva, O., & Blom, H. (2014). Biodiversity of the Silurian osteostracans of the East Baltic. Earth and Environmental Science Transactions of the Royal Society of Edinburgh, 105, 73–148. doi:10.1017/S1755691014000218
- Märss, T. 2019. Silurian cyathaspidid heterostracans of Northern Eurasia. Estonian Journal of Earth Sciences, 68, 113–146. doi:10.3176/earth.2019.11

=== Scientific articles ===
- Mark-Kurik, E. & Noppel, T. 1970. Additional notes on the distribution of vertebrates in the Silurian of Estonia. ENSV Teaduste Akadeemia Toimetised. Keemia. Geoloogia, 19, 2, 171–173. doi:10.3176/chem.geol.1970.2.13
- Märss, T., & Einasto, R. (1978). Distribution of vertebrates in deposits of various facies in the North Baltic Silurian. ENSV TA Toimetised. Keemia. Geoloogia, 27, 1, 16–22. [In Russian with English summary]. doi:10.3176/geol.1978.1.03
- Märss, T. (1979). Lateral line sensory system of the Ludlovian thelodont Phlebolepis elegans Pander. ENSV TA Toimetised. Geoloogia, 28, 3, 108–111. [In Russian with English summary]. doi:10.3176/geol.1979.3.05
- Märss, T. 1982a. Vertebrate zones in the East Baltic Silurian. In: Kaljo, D. & Klaamann, E. (eds). Ecostratigraphy of the East Baltic Silurian. Tallinn, Valgus, 97–106. https://paleoarchive.com/literature/Marss1982-VertebrateZonesBalticSilurian.pdf
- Märss, T. 1982b. Biozones of vertebrates (Silurian of the North Baltic). In: Kaljo, D., & Klaamann, E. (eds). Communities and Biozones in the Baltic Silurian. Tallinn, Valgus, 97–116. [In Russian].
- Märss, T. 1986. Squamation of the thelodont agnathan Phlebolepis. Journal of Vertebrate Paleontology, 6, 1–11. doi:10.1080/02724634.1986.10011593
- Märss, T. 1989. Vertebrates. In: Holland, C. H., & Bassett, M. G. (eds). A Global Standard for the Silurian System. National Museum of Wales, Geological Series No. 9, Cardiff, 284–289. doi:10.1017/S001675680001387X
- Märss, T. 1992. Vertebrate history in the Late Silurian. Proceedings of the Estonian Academy of Sciences. Geology, 41, 205–214. doi:10.3176/geol.1992.4.05
- Märss, T., Fredholm, D., Talimaa, V., Turner, S., Jeppsson, L., & Nowlan, G. 1995. Silurian Vertebrate Biozonal Scheme. In: Lelièvre, H., Wenz, S., Blieck, A., & Cloutier, R. (eds). Premiers Vertébrés et Vertébrés Inferieurs. Geobios, M. S., 369–372. doi:10.1016/S0016-6995(95)80140-5
- Märss, T. 1997. Vertebrates of the Přidoli and Silurian-Devonian boundary beds in Europe. Modern Geology, 21, 17–41.
- Märss, T., Caldwell, M., Gagnier, P.-Y., Goujet, D., Martma, T., Männik, P., & Wilson, M. 1998. Distribution of Silurian and Lower Devonian vertebrate microremains and conodonts in the Baillie-Hamilton and Cornwallis Island sections, Arctic Canada. Proceedings of the Estonian Academy of Sciences. Geology, 47, 51–76. doi:10.3176/geol.1998.2.01
- Märss, T. 2001. Andreolepis (Actinopterygii) in the Upper Silurian of northern Eurasia. Proceedings of the Estonian Academy of Sciences. Geology, 50, 174–189. doi:10.3176/geol.2001.3.03
- Märss, T., & Gagnier, P.-Y. 2001. A new chondrichthyan from the Wenlock, Lower Silurian, of Baillie-Hamilton Island, the Canadian Arctic. Journal of Vertebrate Paleontology, 21, 693–701. doi:10.1671/0272-4634(2001)021[0693:ANCFTW]2.0.CO;2
- Märss, T. 2002. Thelodonts and eustatic sea-level changes. In: Yushkin, N. P., Tsyganko, V. S., & Männik, P. (eds). Geology of the Devonian System. Proceedings of the International Symposium, Syktyvkar, Komi Republic, 9–12 July 2002. Geoprint, Syktyvkar, 100–102.
- Märss, T. & Karatajūtė-Talimaa, V. 2002. Ordovician and Lower Silurian thelodonts from Severnaya Zemlya Archipelago (Russia). Geodiversitas, 24, 2, 381–404. http://sciencepress.mnhn.fr/sites/defult/files/articles/pdf/g2002n2a6.pdf
- Karatajūtė-Talimaa, V. & Märss, T. 2002. Upper Silurian thelodonts from Severnaya Zemlya Archipelago (Russia). Geodiversitas, 24, 2, 405–443. https://sciencepress.mnhn.fr/sites/default/files/articles/pdf/g2002n2a6.pdf
- Märss, T., Wilson, M. V. H., & Thorsteinsson, R. 2002. New thelodont (Agnatha) and possible chondrichthyan (Gnathostomata) taxa established in the Silurian and Lower Devonian of Arctic Canada. Proceedings of the Estonian Academy of Sciences. Geology, 51, 88–120. doi:10.3176/geol.2002.2.02
- Märss, T., Perens, H., & Klaos, T. 2003. Sedimentation of the Himmiste-Kuigu fish bed (Ludlow of Estonia) and taphonomy of the Phlebolepis elegans Pander (Thelodonti) shoal. Proceedings of the Estonian Academy of Sciences, Geology, 52, 239–265. doi:10.3176/geol.2003.4.04
- Märss, T., & Miller, C. G. (2004). Thelodonts and distribution of associated conodonts from the Llandovery-lowermost Lochkovian of the Welsh Borderland. Palaeontology, 47, 1211–1265. doi:10.1111/j.0031-0239.2004.00409.x
- Märss, T., Kleesment, A., & Niit, M. (2008). Karksilepis parva gen. et sp. nov. (Chondrichthyes) from the Burtnieki Regional Stage, Middle Devonian of Estonia. Estonian Journal of Earth Sciences, 57, 219–230. doi:10.3176/earth.2008.4.02
- Märss, T., & Wilson, M. V. H. (2008). Buccopharyngo-branchial denticles of Phlebolepis elegans Pander (Thelodonti, Agnatha). Journal of Vertebrate Paleontology, 28, 601–612. doi:10.1671/0272-4634(2008)28[601:BDOPEP]2.0.CO;2
- Märss, T., & Männik, P. (2013). Revision of Silurian vertebrate biozones and their correlation with the conodont succession. Estonian Journal of Earth Sciences, 62, 181–204. doi:10.3176/earth.2013.15
- Märss, T., Wilson, M., Lees, J., Saat, T., & Špilev, H. 2015. A comparative SEM study of ossicles in the Pleuronectiformes (Teleostei) of the Baltic Sea. Proceedings of the Estonian Academy of Sciences, 64, 495–517. doi:10.3176/proc.2015.4.05
- Märss, T., Wilson, J., Saat, T., & Špilev, H. 2017. Gill rakers and teeth of three pleuronectiform species (Teleostei) of the Baltic Sea: a microichthyological approach. Estonian Journal of Earth Sciences, 66, 21–46. doi:10.3176/earth.2017.01
- Wilson, M. V. H., Hanke, G. F., & Märss, T. 2007. Paired fins of jawless vertebrates and their homologies across the "agnathan"-gnathostome transition, pp. 122–149 in Anderson, J. S., & Sues, H.-D. (eds.). Major Transitions in Vertebrate Evolution, 432 p. Indiana University Press.

=== Popular-scientific articles ===
- Märss, T. 1982. Vanimate selgroogsete leiud Saaremaal [The oldest vertebrate findings in Saaremaa]. Eesti Loodus, 10, 646–654. ISSN 0131-5862.
- Märss, T. 1995. Luatute kivistised [Agnathans, a group of primitive vertebrates]. Eesti Loodus, 7, 192–194.
- Märss, T. 2011. Ühe väljasurnud kala lugu Saaremaalt [The story of an extinct fish from Saaremaa]. Loodusesõber, 3, 20–23. ISSN 1736-4531.
- Märss, T. 2011. Siluri selgroogsed: ühe rühma arengulugu [Silurian vertebrates: the history of a group]. Parmasto, E., Laisk, A., & Kaljo, D. (eds). Teadusmõte Eestis (VI). Elu-ja maateadused. Eesti Teaduste Akadeemia, Tallinn, 117–124. ISBN 978-9949-21-823-3

=== Other works ===
- Klaamann, E. & Einasto, R. 1982. Coral reefs of the Baltic Silurian (structure, facies relations). In: Kaljo, D., & Klaamann, E. (eds). Ecostratigraphy of the East Baltic Silurian. Tallinn, Valgus, 35–41.
- Kaljo, D., Kiipli, T., & Martma, T. 1997. Carbon isotope event markers through the Wenlock-Přidoli sequence at Ohesaare (Estonia) and Priekule (Latvia). Palaeogeography, Palaeoclimatology, Palaeoecology, 132, 1–4, 211–223.
- Kaljo, D., Kiipli, T., & Martma, T. 1998. Correlation of carbon isotope events and environmental cyclicity in the East Baltic Silurian. Silurian cycles. Linkages of dynamic stratigraphy with atmospheric, oceanic, and tectonic changes. New York State Museum Bulletin, 491, 297–312.
- Pirrus, E.-A., Kink, H., Märss, T., Karukäpp, R., & Lust, L. 1995. Eesti Ürglooduse Raamat IX osa. Saare maakond. [Estonian Primeval Nature Book, part IX, Saare County] (Täht-Kok, K., ed.). 756 p. KKM Info- ja tehnokeskus [Information and Technology Center, Ministry of Environment].

== General references ==
- Tiiu Märss. Eesti Entsüklopeedia. Eesti elulood [Tiiu Märss. In: Estonian Encyclopaedia. Estonian biographies]. Estonian Encyclopaedia Publishers, 2000, 14, p. 314.
- Tiiu Märss. Eesti Teaduse Biograafiline Leksikon (K. Siilivask, ed.). Eesti Entsüklopeediakirjastus [Tiiu Märss. In: Biographical Lexikon of the Estonian Science. Estonian Encyclopaedia Publishers], 2005, 2. Tallinn, p. 691, 744.
