= Palaeodontidae =

Scientific classification
- Kingdom: Animalia
- Phylum: Chordata
- Infraphylum: Agnatha
- Class: †Thelodonti
- Order: †Thelodontiformes
- Family: †Palaeodontidae; Obruchev, 1964

Genera
- †Palaeodus; †Archodus

Extinct family of jawless fishes

Palaeodontidae is an extinct family of thelodont vertebrate agnathans that lived during the Lower Ordovician. The dermal denticles of these thelodonts lack a neck or base and form simple orthodentine cones.
