= Valyalepis =

Valyalepis Temporal range: earliest Silurian (Rhuddanian)

Scientific classification
- Kingdom: Animalia
- Phylum: Chordata
- Infraphylum: Agnatha
- Class: †Thelodonti
- Order: †Thelodontiformes
- Family: †Loganelliidae
- Genus: †Valyalepis; Turner & Nowlan, 1995

Extinct genus of jawless fishes

Valyalepis is an extinct genus of thelodonts in the family Loganelliidae. It lived in the Severnaya Zemlya archipelago during the earliest part of the Silurian period.

Isolated scales of Valyalepis are robust and abrasion-resistant, similar to modern sharks which live among rough substrates such as rocky caves or reefs.
