= Turiniida =

Scientific classification
- Kingdom: Animalia
- Phylum: Chordata
- Class: †Thelodonti
- Order: †Turiniida

Families
- †Turiniidae

Synonyms
- †Cephalopteridae Powrie, 1870

Extinct order of jawless fishes

Turiniida is an extinct order of jawless fish from the Lower Devonian of Europe.

Dermal denticles and larger body fossils are known from this order and are thought to be generally similar to the Thelodontidans. Members of Turiniida have eight branchial pouches which resemble those found in the members of Osteostraci and they lack a nasohypophysial aperture on the dorsal surface of their head.
