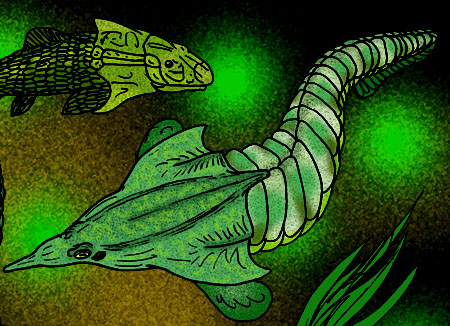

Scientific classification
- Kingdom: Animalia
- Phylum: Chordata
- Infraphylum: Agnatha
- Class: †Pituriaspida
- Order: †Pituriaspidiformes
- Family: †Pituriaspididae
- Genus: †Neeyambaspis; Young, 1991
- Species: †N. enigmatica

Binomial name
- †Neeyambaspis enigmatica Young, 1991

= Neeyambaspis =

Neeyambaspis enigmatica Temporal range: Mid Devonian

Genus of jawless fishes

Neeyambaspis enigmatica ("Enigmatic shield of Neeyamba Hill") is the lesser known of the two species of pituriaspid agnathans. The species lived in estuaries during the Middle Devonian, in what is now the Georgina Basin of Western Queensland, Australia.

N. enigmatica differed from its relative, Pituriaspis doylei, in that the headshield was triangular, rather than elongated, that the rostrum was much smaller and shorter, and that there was no cavity at the base of the rostrum that suggested the presence of nasal openings.
