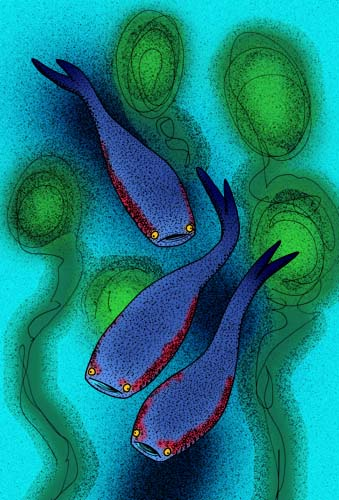
- Archipelepis turbinata

Scientific classification
- Kingdom: Animalia
- Phylum: Chordata
- Infraphylum: Agnatha
- Class: †Thelodonti
- Order: †Archipelepidiformes; Wilson & Märss, 2009

Families
- †Archipelepididae; †Boothialepididae

= Archipelepidiformes =

Archipelepidiformes Temporal range: Late Telychian-Sheinwoodian

Extinct order of jawless fishes

Archipelepidiformes is an order of extinct jawless fishes in the class Thelodonti.

Archipelepidiforms are regarded as the basalmost thelodonts primarily because the histology and morphology of archipelepidiforms have many similarities with the histology and morphology of pteraspidomorphs, hinting that the two groups share a common ancestor, and hinting that archipelepidiforms retain many primitive features from this common ancestor.

Currently, only whole body fossils of Archipelepis are known: these fossils show that archipelepids were tadpole-like animals with no fins aside from a forked caudal fin.
