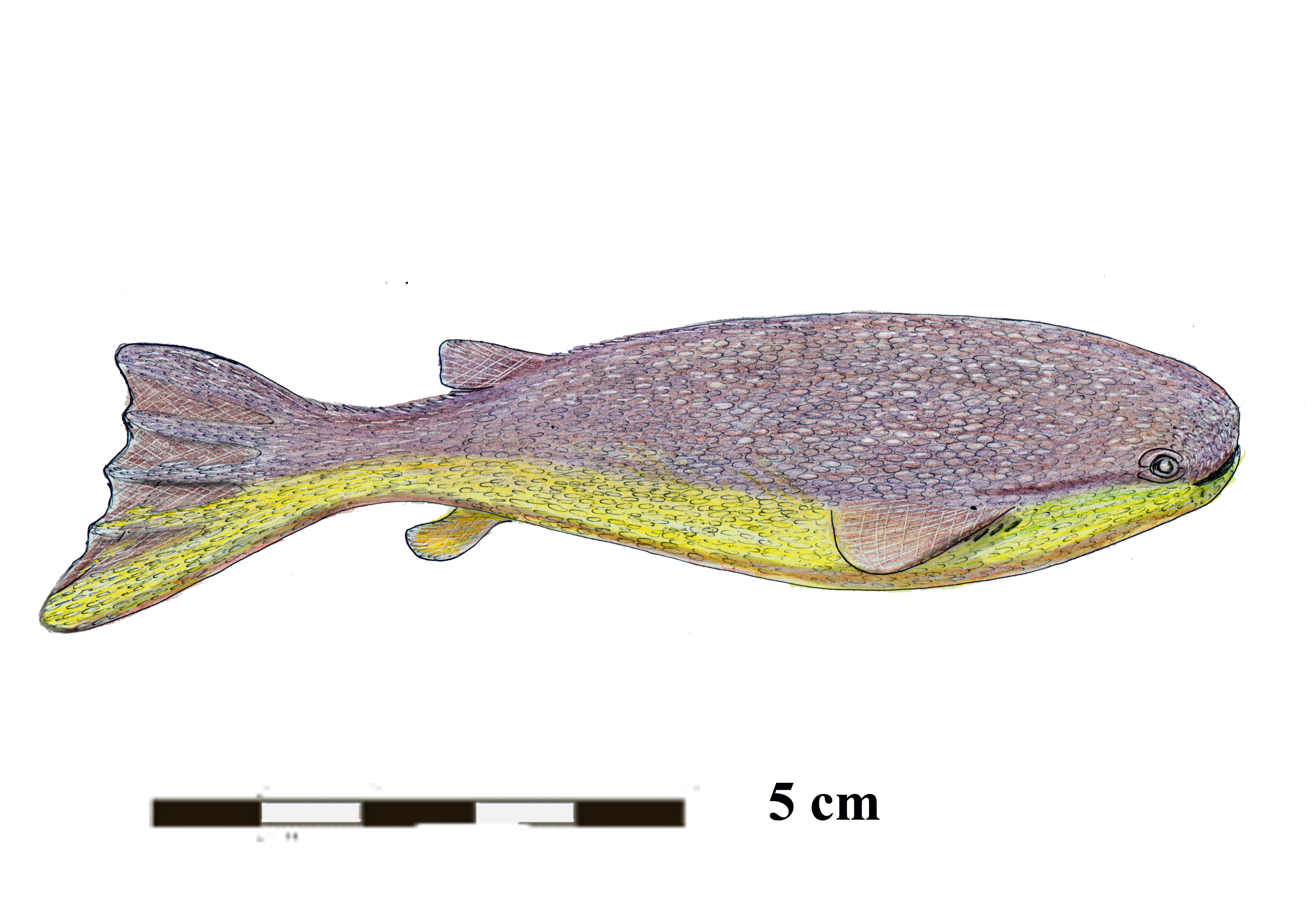
- Phlebolepis

Scientific classification
- Domain: Eukaryota
- Kingdom: Animalia
- Phylum: Chordata
- Infraphylum: Agnatha
- Class: †Thelodonti
- Order: †Phlebolepidiformes
- Family: †Phlebolepididae; Berg, 1940

Type genus
- Phlebolepis

Genera
- †Erepsilepis; †Phlebolepis

= Phlebolepididae =

Extinct family of jawless fishes

Phlebolepididae is an extinct thelodont agnathan family in the order Phlebolepidiformes.
