= Oeselia =

Scientific classification
- Kingdom: Animalia
- Phylum: Chordata
- Infraphylum: Agnatha
- Class: †Thelodonti
- Order: †Thelodontiformes
- Family: †Oeseliidae; Märss, 2005
- Genus: †Oeselia; Märss, 2005
- Species: †O. mosaica

Binomial name
- †Oeselia mosaica Märss, 2005

Species of fish (fossil)

Oeselia mosaica is a fossil jawless fish and is the only species in its genus and in the family Oeseliidae (Oesel being the old name for Saaremaa Island in Estonia). It is a member of an extinct family of thelodonts. The family and genus were established along with the description of the species by Tiuu Märss in 2005.

== Morphology ==
Oeseliidae are distinct in the nature of their scales, as are most of the thelodonts, as scales tend to preserve in higher quality and quantity. Their scales are very fine, with a network-like pattern. The shapes of the scales are extremely variable, though are typically curved, and are all separated by fine grooves. Scales in general are very small, ranging from 0.2 mm to 0.45 mm long, and are flat, facing anteriorly. Oeseliidae, as with most thelodonts, can have their scales classified into head varieties, transitional varieties, and trunk varieties. The head scales possess a crenulated crown, while the transitional scales have notches anteriorly or antero-laterally of the crown. Trunk scales possess a quadrangular crown surface, where the posterior section tapers off or lowers to the anterior. Scales appear flat and smooth under a microscope, but possess a very fine pattern.

Isolated scales of Oeselia are robust and abrasion-resistant, similar to modern sharks which live among rough substrates such as rocky caves or reefs.
