= Stroinolepis =

Stroinolepis Temporal range: Dapingian–Hirnantian

Scientific classification
- Kingdom: Animalia
- Phylum: Chordata
- Infraphylum: Agnatha
- Class: †Thelodonti
- Order: †Thelodontiformes
- Family: †Loganelliidae
- Genus: †Stroinolepis; Märss & Karatajūtē-Talimaa, 2002

Species
- S. maenniki Märss & Karatajūtē-Talimaa, 2002 (type)

Genus of jawless fishes

Stroinolepis is an extinct genus of thelodontid that lived during the Middle and Late Ordovician period in what is now October Revolution Island, Severnaya Zemlya archipelago of Russia. It is known by scales of 0.2 to 1 mm in length.

Generic name refers to the Strojnaya River where the holotype was found, while the specific epithet is given after Dr. P. Männik, who found and gave the specimen for study.

Isolated scales of Stroinolepis are robust and abrasion-resistant, similar to modern sharks which live among rough substrates such as rocky caves or reefs.
