= Eestilepis =

Eestilepis Temporal range: Sheinwoodian

Scientific classification
- Kingdom: Animalia
- Phylum: Chordata
- Infraphylum: Agnatha
- Class: †Thelodonti
- Order: †Thelodontiformes
- Family: †Eestilepididae; Märss, Wilson and Thorsteinsson, 2002
- Genus: †Eestilepis; Märss, Wilson and Thorsteinsson, 2002
- Species: †E. prominens

Binomial name
- †Eestilepis prominens Märss, Wilson and Thorsteinsson, 2002

Genus of thelodont fish

Eestilepis prominens is a species of thelodont, a clade of ancient jawless fish. It is the only species in the genus Eestilepis and the family Eestilepididae, though some sources lump it into the family Shieliidae. The species is known from the Cape Phillips Formation of the Canadian Arctic Archipelago, and dates back to the Sheinwoodian age of the Silurian.

== Etymology ==
Eestilepis is named after Eesti, the endonym of Estonia, from which originates co-discoverer Tiiu Märss, and Ancient Greek λεπίς (lepis) meaning "scale". The specific epithet prominens comes from Latin meaning "to stand out", after the height of the median area of the scale crowns.

== Material ==
The holotype, GSC 117198, preserves the anterior half of the specimen as well as a collection of scales. The preserved fragment is 12.4 centimetres (4.9 in) long and 8.2 centimetres (3.2 in) wide.

The scales of Eestilepis are robust and abrasion-resistant, similar to modern sharks which live among rough substrates such as rocky caves or reefs.
