= Zuegelepis =

Scientific classification
- Kingdom: Animalia
- Phylum: Chordata
- Infraphylum: Agnatha
- Class: †Thelodonti
- Order: †Phlebolepidiformes
- Family: †Katoporodidae
- Genus: †Zuegelepis; Turner, 1999
- Species: †Z. potanus

Binomial name
- †Zuegelepis potanus Turner, 1999

Extinct species of fish

Zuegelepis is a species of prehistoric jawless fish from the Hendricks Formation of Michigan's Upper Peninsula. It was a thelodont which lived in the early Silurian, specifically the Aeronian stage of the Llandovery Epoch. The scales of Zuegelepis may have served in a role to defend against Parasitism, similar to the denticles of modern sharks which form large groups and cruise at slow to medium speeds.
