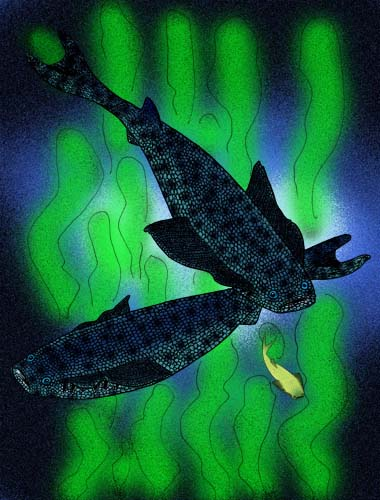
- Life restorations of T. parvidens (large dark thelodonts) and Loganellia (small yellow thelodont)

Scientific classification
- Kingdom: Animalia
- Phylum: Chordata
- Infraphylum: Agnatha
- Class: †Thelodonti
- Order: †Thelodontiformes
- Family: †Coelolepidae
- Genus: †Thelodus; Agassiz, 1839

Type species
- Thelodus parvidens

Synonyms
- ?Coelolepis; Thelolepis; Pachylepis

= Thelodus =

Thelodus Temporal range: Silurian (Wenlock to Pridoli epochs)

Extinct genus of jawless fishes

Thelodus (from Greek: θηλή thēlḗ, 'nipple' and Greek: ὀδούς odoús, 'tooth') is an extinct genus of thelodont agnathan that lived during the Silurian period. Fossils have been found in Europe, Asia and North America.

== Description ==
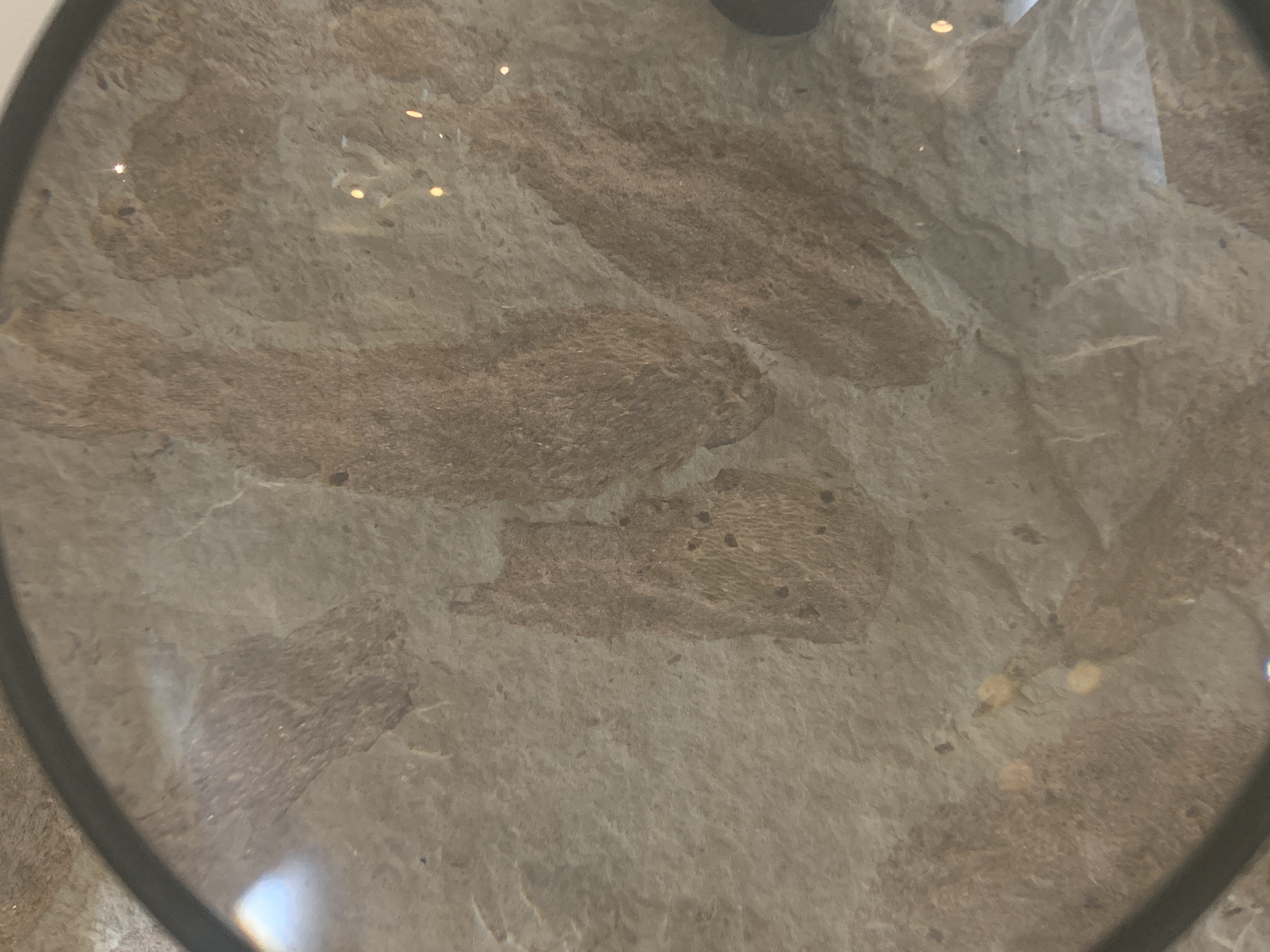
Thelodus sp. from Oesel, Estonia.

Unlike many thelodonts, species of Thelodus are known not only from scales, but from impressions in rocks. Some species, such as the Canadian T. inauditus, are thought to be comparable in size to other thelodonts, i.e., from 5 to 15 centimeters in length. The scales of the type species, T. parvidens (syn. T. macintoshi) of Silurian Great Britain, however, reach the size of coins, and, if proportioned like other thelodonts, such as Loganellia, the living animal would have been about one meter in length.

=== Scale-based ecology ===
Many Thelodus species have been named, and they may have had different habitat preferences based on their scale structures. The scales of T. parvidens, T. sculptilis, T. traquairi, and T. calvus are robust and abrasion-resistant, similar to modern sharks which live among rough substrates such as rocky caves or reefs. T. visvaldi has streamlined scales to minimize drag, similar to modern sharks capable of strong swimming in open waters. A few species (T. macintoshi, T. inauditus) are too fragmentary to draw any firm conclusions.

Some species (T. carinatus, T. marginatus, T. matukhini) are known from two types of isolated scales: abrasion-resistant scales and generalized scales which offer a compromise between streamlining, armor, and anti-parasite protection. Modern sharks which forage on a sandy or muddy seabed tend to have abrasion-resistant scales on the belly and generalized scales on the back. T. laevis has a unique mosaic of generalized and abrasion-resistant scales across the entire body.
