= Longodus =

Longodus Temporal range: Ludlow epoch
- Artist's reconstruction

Scientific classification
- Kingdom: Animalia
- Phylum: Chordata
- Infraphylum: Agnatha
- Class: †Thelodonti
- Order: †Thelodontiformes
- Family: †Longodidae; Märss, 2006
- Genus: †Longodus; Märss, 2006
- Species: †L. acicularis

Binomial name
- †Longodus acicularis Märss, 2006

Extinct genus of jawless fishes

Longodus (Long meaning long and odus meaning tooth) is an extinct genus of thelodont, placed in its own family – Longodidae – which existed in what is now Estonia during the Ludlow epoch of the upper Silurian period. The type and only species is Longodus acicularis. They are most noted for their long, needle-like scales, which run vertically along their trunk.

== Description ==
Longodus acicularis possessed narrow but elongated scales, approximately 0.5 mm to 1.0 mm in length, with a width to length ratio of up to 1:11. Their heads were almond shaped, connected to a medium trunk and short, distinctly forked tail. Scales contained ridges along the margins, creating a ripple like visual effect. They also possess lateral spines posterior to the crown. The scales on the crown are dentine based, covered by enameloid, while the scales of the base are acellular aspidin based.
