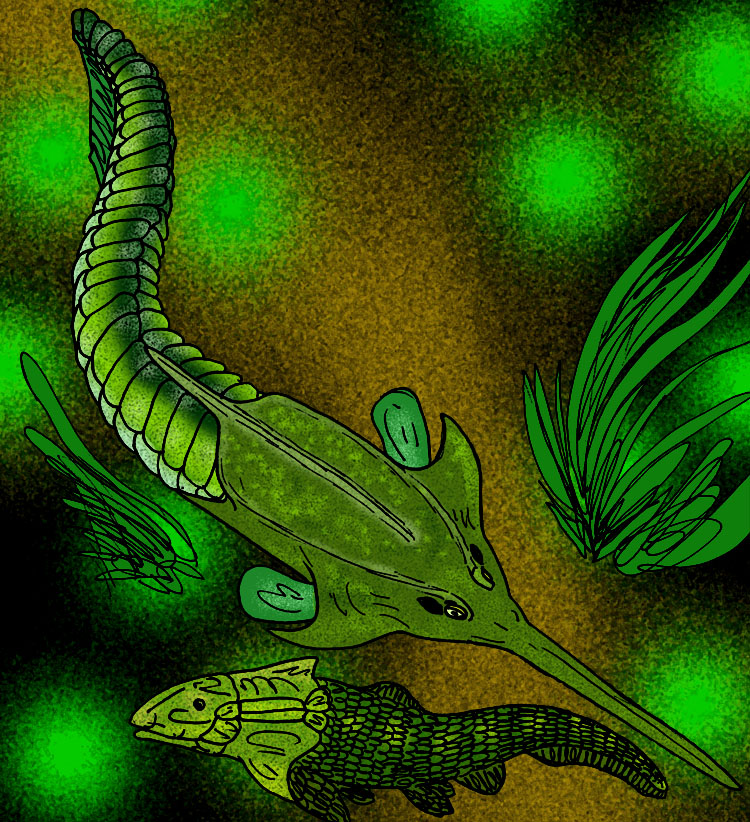
- An artist's reconstruction of Pituriaspis doylei

Scientific classification
- Kingdom: Animalia
- Phylum: Chordata
- Infraphylum: Agnatha
- Class: †Pituriaspida
- Order: †Pituriaspidiformes
- Family: †Pituriaspididae
- Genus: †Pituriaspis; Young, 1991
- Species: †P. doylei

Binomial name
- †Pituriaspis doylei Young, 1991

= Pituriaspis =

Pituriaspis doylei Temporal range: Givetian

Genus of jawless fishes

Pituriaspis doylei is one of two known species of jawless fish belonging to the class Pituriaspida, and is the better known of the two. The species lived in estuaries during the Givetian epoch of the Middle Devonian, 390 million years ago in what is now the Georgina Basin of Western Queensland, Australia.

The paleontologist Gavin Young named the fossil agnathan Pituriaspis doylei after the nicotine-containing drug pituri, as he thought he might be hallucinating upon viewing the fossil fish's bizarre form. The first specimens of P. doylei were empty sandstone casts of the head shields, with none of the original bone remaining.

P. doylei vaguely resembled the Osteostraci, though neither are considered to be close relatives. The headshield extends posteriorly to form a long abdominal division which probably reached the anal region. The dorsal portion of its head armor differs from osteostracans in that the orbits of the eyes are set apart from each other, and that the shield has no pineal foramen (the "hole" between the eyes of Cephalaspis and its relatives), and that an opening at the base of the rostrum gives very little hints about the nature of the nasal openings. The exoskeleton is ornamented with tiny rounded tubercles. A unique characteristic of the Pituriaspida is a peculiar pit, which may have held some sort of sensory organ in life, located ventrally to the orbits, known as the adorbital depression. Almost nothing is known of the rest of the body, save that it had a pair of well-developed pectoral fins, similar to osteostracans and gnathostome fish.

== Bibliography ==
- Janvier, Philippe. Early Vertebrates. Oxford, New York: Oxford University Press, 1998. ISBN 0-19-854047-7
- Long, John A. The Rise of Fishes: 500 Million Years of Evolution. Baltimore: The Johns Hopkins University Press, 1996. ISBN 0-8018-5438-5
