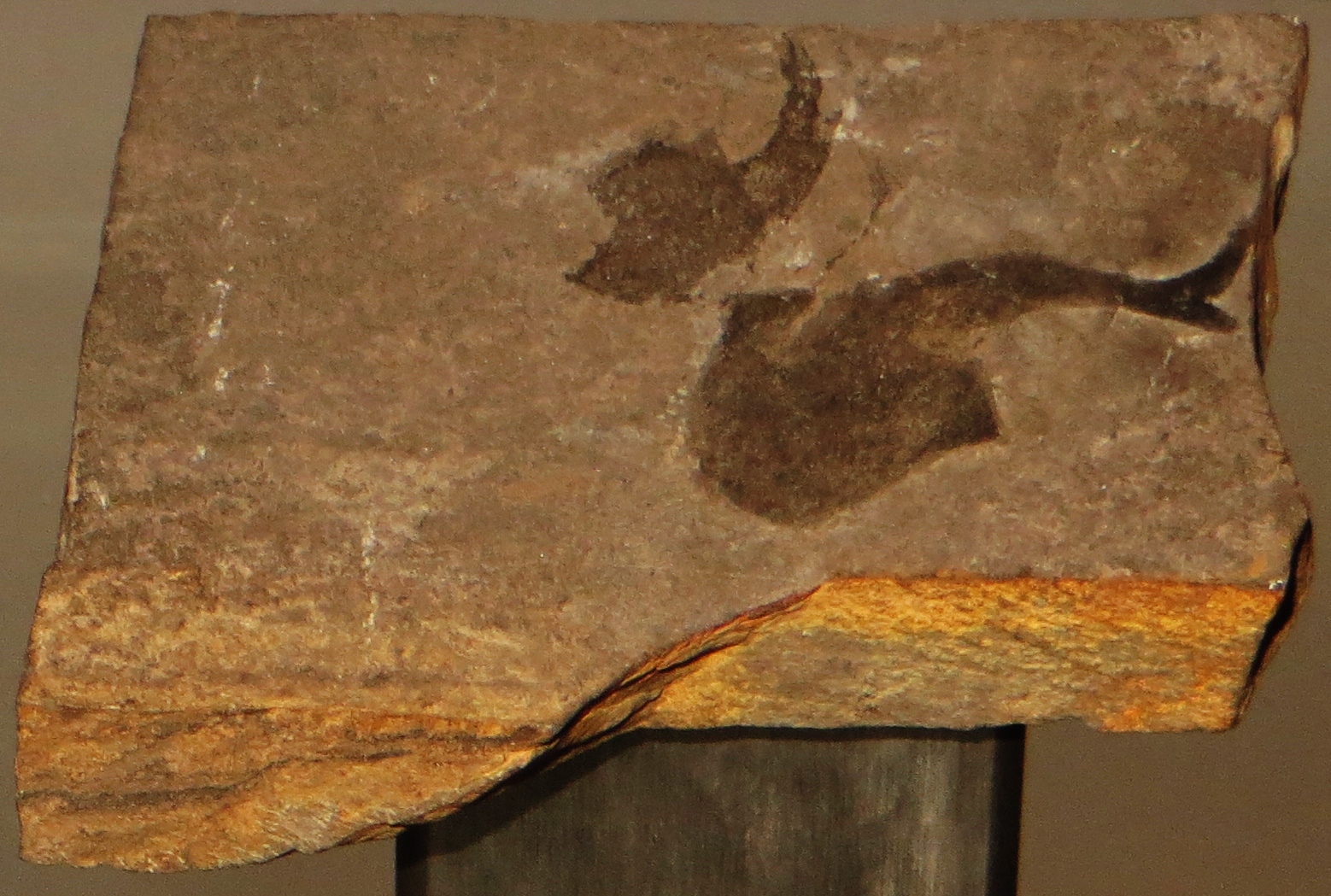
- Fossil specimens

Scientific classification
- Kingdom: Animalia
- Phylum: Chordata
- Infraphylum: Agnatha
- Class: †Thelodonti
- Order: †Furcacaudiformes
- Family: †Lanarkiidae
- Genus: †Lanarkia; Traquair, 1898

Type species
- Lanarkia horrida Traquair, 1898

Other species
- Lanarkia lanceolata Marss & Ritchie, 1998; Lanarkia spinulosa Traquair, 1898

Synonyms
- Lanarkia spinosa Traquair, 1898

= Lanarkia =

Lanarkia Temporal range: Upper Silurian

Extinct genus of jawless fishes that lived in modern-day Scotland and Canada

Lanarkia is a genus of extinct thelodont agnathan which existed in what is now Scotland and Canada during the upper Silurian period.

== Description ==
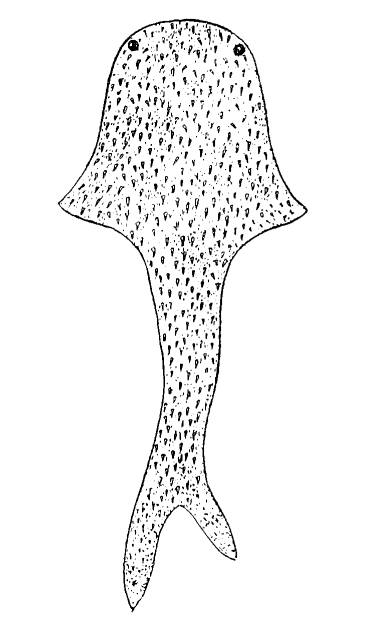
Life restoration

Lanarkia were very small fish around 30-45 cm in length that would have been possible prey to eurypterids.

The scales of Lanarkia spinulosa likely served an anti-parasite role, similar to modern sharks which form large groups and cruise at slow to medium speeds. Lanarkia lanceolata preserves scales with a generalized form, similar to modern sharks which swim slowly in open deep-water environments. Lanarkia horrida has an unusual combination of small and larger pointed scales. They could have served a generalist or anti-predator role, though juvenile small-spotted catsharks (Scyliorhinus canicula) use similar scales on their tail to rasp at food.
