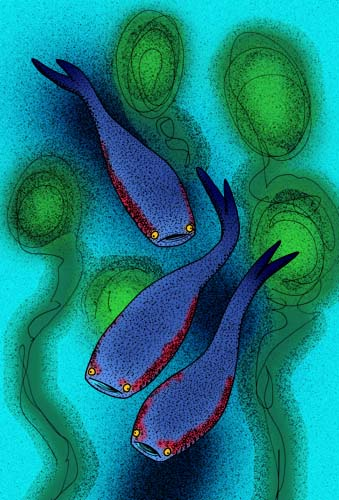
- Archipelepis turbinata

Scientific classification
- Kingdom: Animalia
- Phylum: Chordata
- Infraphylum: Agnatha
- Class: †Thelodonti
- Order: †Archipelepidiformes
- Family: †Archipelepididae; Märss in Soehn et al., 2001
- Genus: †Archipelepis; Märss in Soehn et al., 2001

Type species
- †Archipelepis turbinata Märss in Soehn et al., 2001

Species
- †Archipelepis bifurcata; †Archipelepis turbinata

= Archipelepis =

Archipelepis Temporal range: Late Telychian-Sheinwoodian

Extinct genus of jawless fishes

Archipelepis is a genus of extinct thelodont agnathans, and are the most primitive recognized thelodonts of which whole body fossils are known. Fossils of bodies and scales are currently known from Late Telychian to Wenlock-aged marine strata of northern Canada.

== Description ==
Both species have similar body morphology, in that both resembled tadpoles with forked tails. Scale morphology differs in that A. bifurcata has forked scales with two prong-like spires, and that A. turbinata has bulbous, pointed scales that resemble upside-down spinning tops.

The scales of Archipelepis are robust and abrasion-resistant, similar to modern sharks which live among rough substrates such as rocky caves or reefs.
