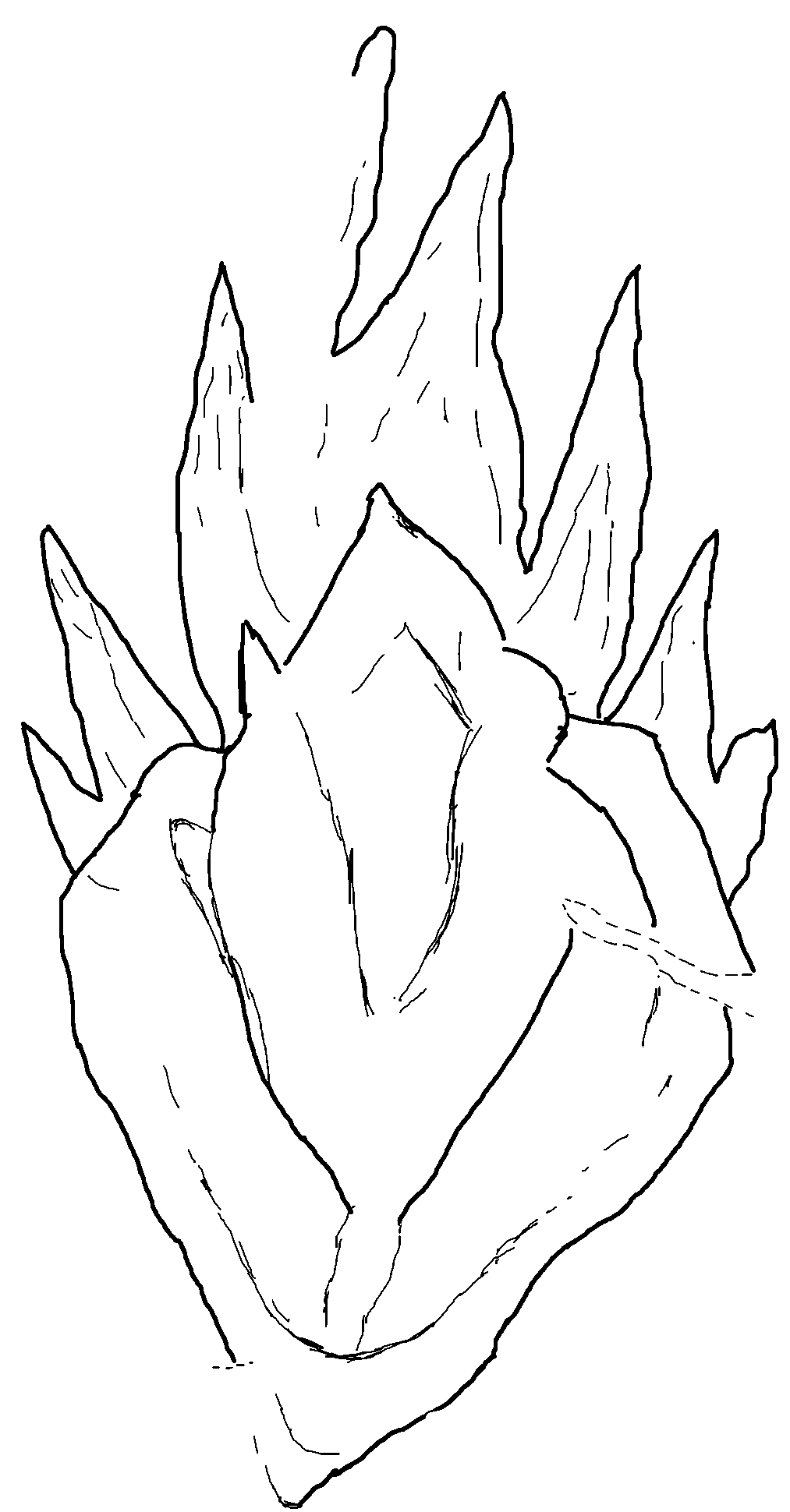
- Representative denticle of Paralogania.

Scientific classification
- Kingdom: Animalia
- Phylum: Chordata
- Infraphylum: Agnatha
- Order: †Loganelliformes
- Family: †Loganiidae
- Genus: †Paralogania

= Paralogania =

Paralogania Temporal range: Upper Silurian

Extinct genus of jawless fishes

Paralogania is an extinct genus of thelodont fish that is known from the Upper Silurian geological period (Wenlock / Ludlow); the best fossil deposits are from the Baltic Sea region, but it is widespread in the Northern Hemisphere.

Many Paralogania species have been named, and they may have had different habitat preferences based on their scale structures. Some species (P. borealis, P. foliala, P. kachanovi, P. kummerowi, P. tarranti, P. wilsoni) are known from scales which are robust and abrasion-resistant, similar to modern sharks which live among rough substrates such as rocky caves or reefs. Others (P. consimilis, P. kaarmisensis, P. klubovi, P. ludlowiensis, P. menneri, P. perensae, P. readbayensis) are known from spiny scales which likely served an anti-parasite role, similar to modern sharks which form large groups and cruise at slow to medium speeds.
