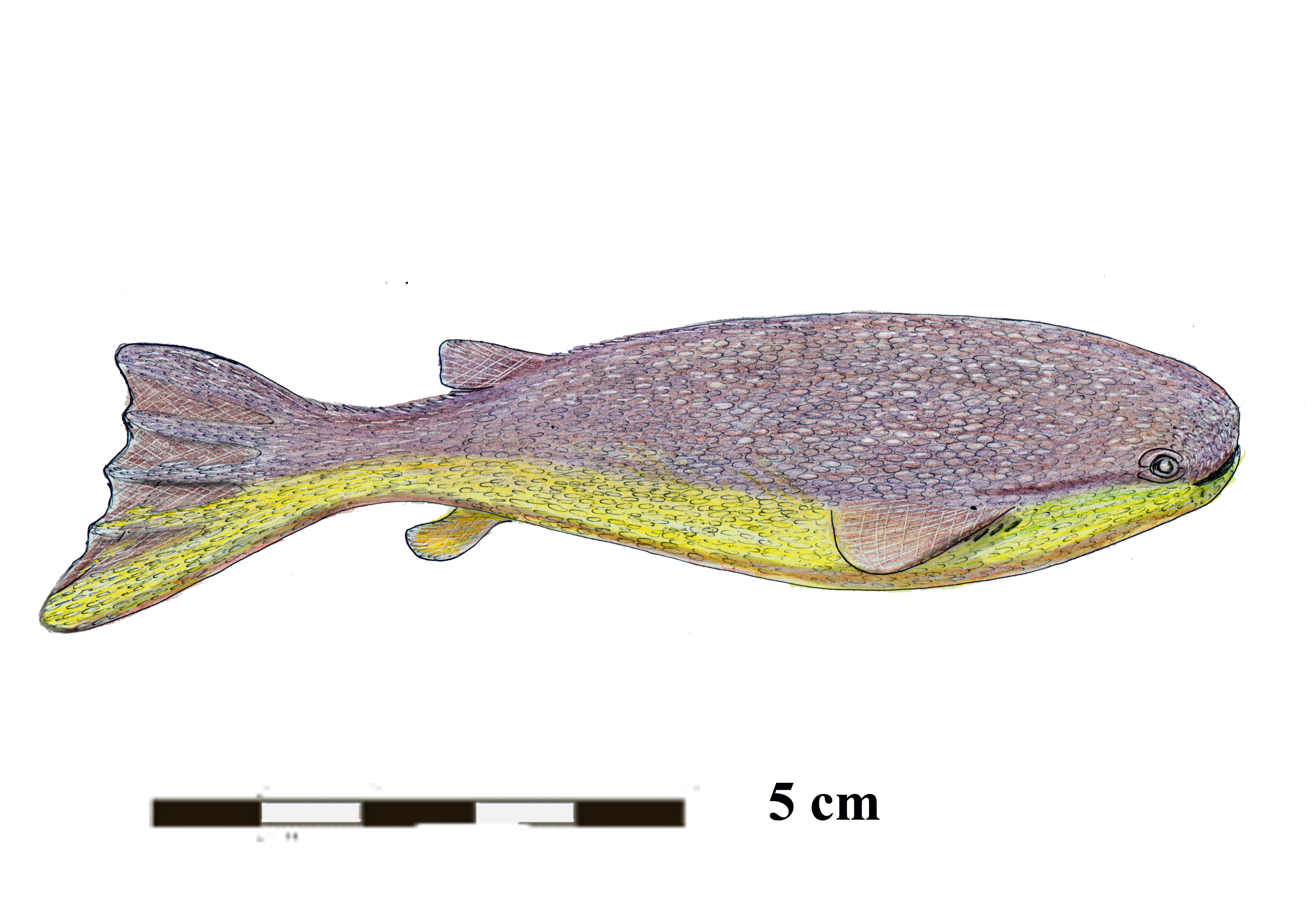
- Phlebolepis elegans, thelodont from Late Silurian of Baltic states, Russia and England

Scientific classification
- Kingdom: Animalia
- Phylum: Chordata
- Infraphylum: Agnatha
- Class: †Thelodonti
- Order: †Phlebolepidiformes
- Family: †Phlebolepididae
- Genus: †Phlebolepis; Pander, 1856

Species
- †P. elegans Pander, 1856; †P. ornata Märss 1986

= Phlebolepis =

Phlebolepis Temporal range: late Silurian

Extinct genus of jawless fishes

Phlebolepis is an extinct thelodont agnathan genus belonging to the family Phlebolepididae. Whole fossils are found in Late Silurian (Ludlow epoch) aged strata from Saaremaa, Estonia. Phlebolepis elegans was average-sized for a thelodont, 7 cm long.

The scales of Phlebolepis are robust and abrasion-resistant, similar to modern sharks which live among rough substrates such as rocky caves or reefs.

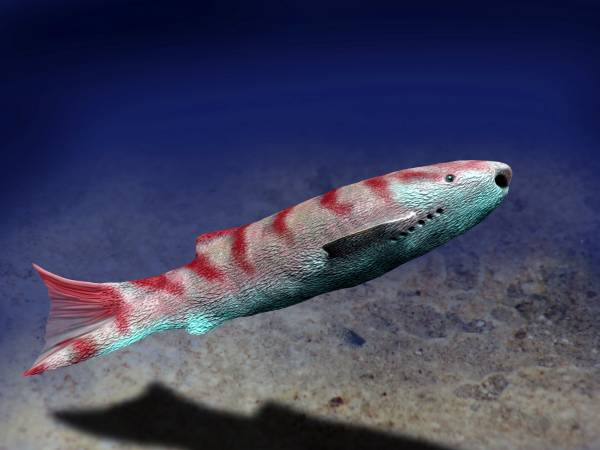
Life reconstruction of Phlebolepis elegans
