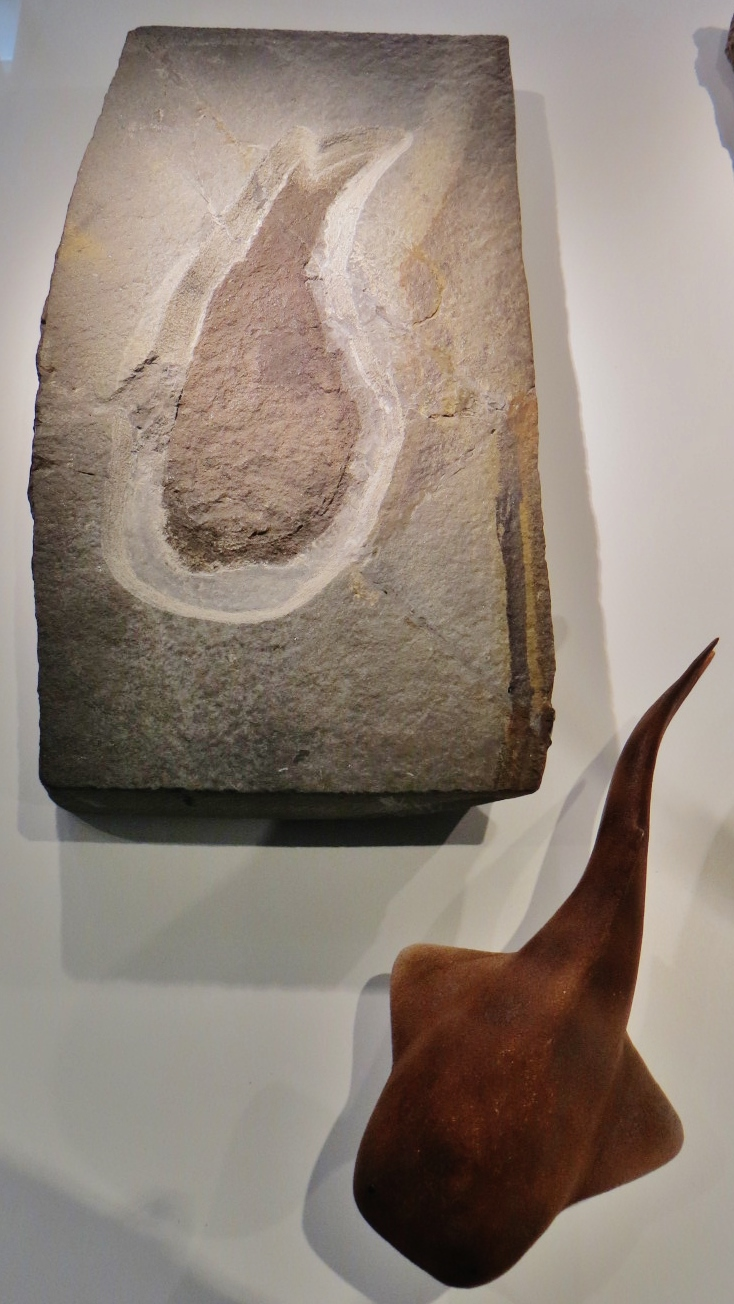
- Loganellia scotica (Fossil and model, Museum am Löwentor, Stuttgart)

Scientific classification
- Kingdom: Animalia
- Phylum: Chordata
- Infraphylum: Agnatha
- Class: †Thelodonti
- Order: †Thelodontiformes
- Family: †Loganelliidae
- Genus: †Loganellia; Fredholm, 1990

Type species
- †Loganellia scotica (Traquair, 1898)

Species
- †Loganellia aldridgei; †Loganellia cuneata; †Loganellia grossi; †Loganellia matura; †Loganellia prolata; †Loganellia scotica; †Loganellia sulcata; †Loganellia unispinata

= Loganellia =

Loganellia Temporal range: Silurian (Rhuddanian) to Early Devonian (Lochkovian)

Extinct genus of jawless fishes

Loganellia is a genus of jawless fish which lived between 430 and 370 million years ago, during the Silurian and Devonian periods of the Paleozoic. Loganellia belonged to the Thelodonti class and like other thelodonts possessed scales instead of plate armor.

== Denticle structures ==
Loganellia are thought to be more closely related to the crown group of gnathostomes than conodonts. They are noted for their denticle whorls - oropharyngeal denticles that lined their branchial bars - which are thought to be homologous with other, later gnathostome teeth. In this sense, Loganellia may possess the earliest known dental structures related to modern teeth, and would have evolved in the throat, rather than through dermal denticles or jaws.

=== Scale-based ecology ===
Many different Loganellia species have been named, and they may have had different habitat preferences based on their scale forms. Many species (L. almgreeni, L. asiatica, L. avonia, L. grossi, L. incompta, L. matura, L. sibirica, L. tuvaensis) only preserve robust and abrasion-resistant scales, similar to modern sharks which live among rough substrates such as rocky caves or reefs. Others (L. aldridgei, L. einari, L. prolata, L. sulcata) preserve generalized scales which offer a compromise between streamlining, armor, and anti-parasite protection, similar to deep-sea sharks which cruise slowly in open water. A few (L. cuneata, L. exilis, L. unispinata) preserve abrasion-resistant scales on the belly and generalized scales on the back, similar to sharks which forage on sandy or muddy substrates. L. scotica is unique in its high concentration of abrasion-resistant scales on the head and generalized scales on the rest of its body. Such a combination could indicate head-first foraging in substrate though a diet such as detritivory.

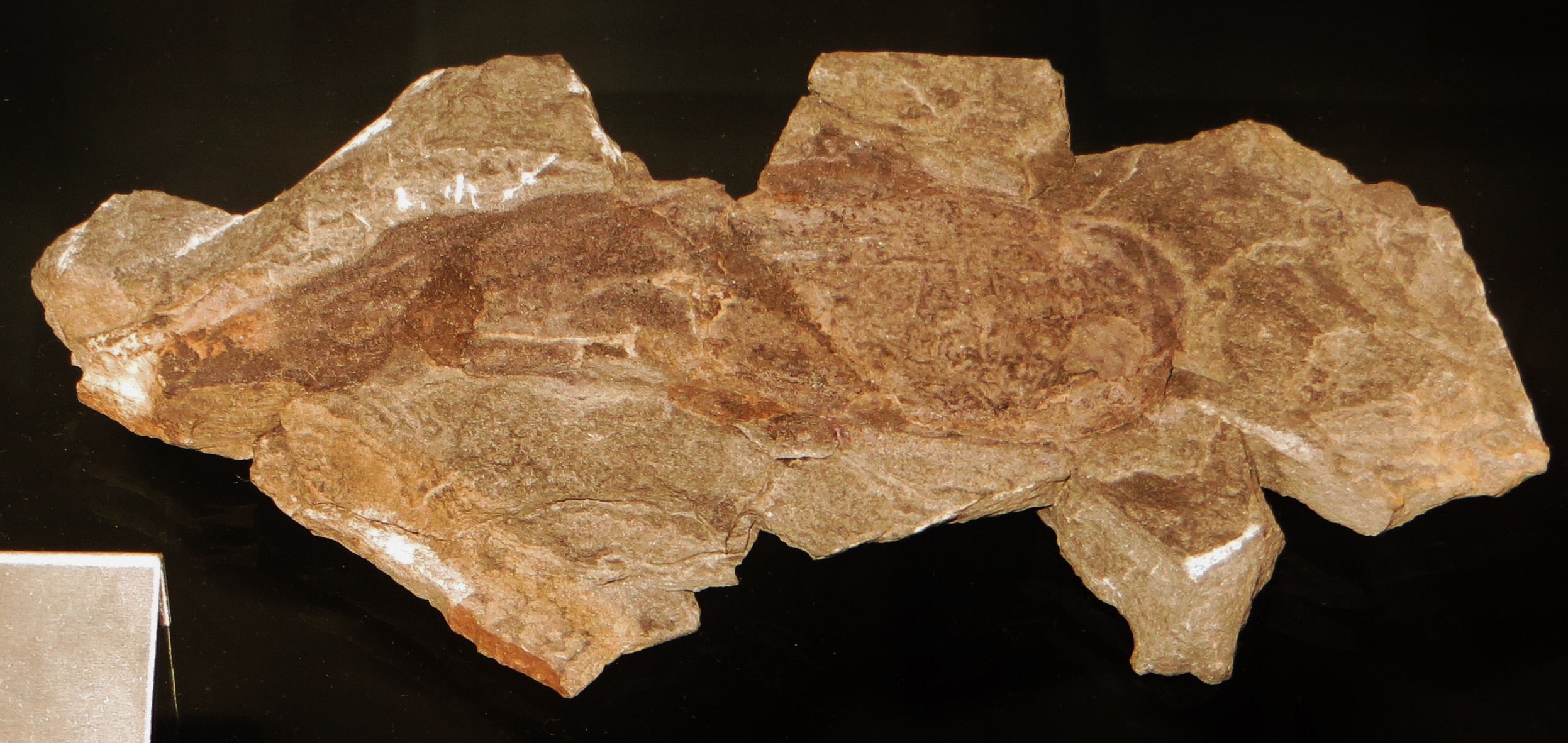
Fossil

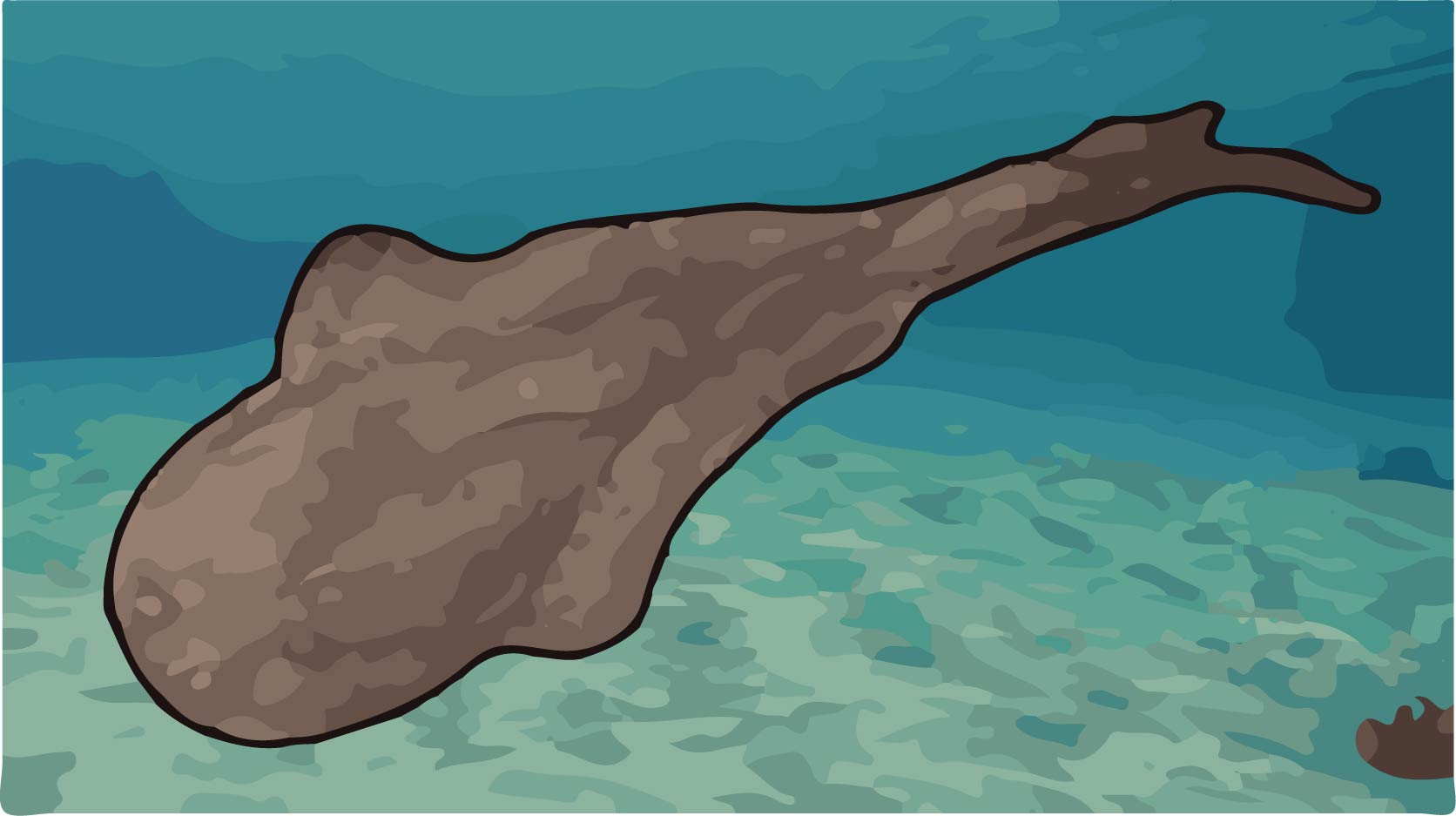
Loganellia, swimming in a shallow sea 400 million years ago.

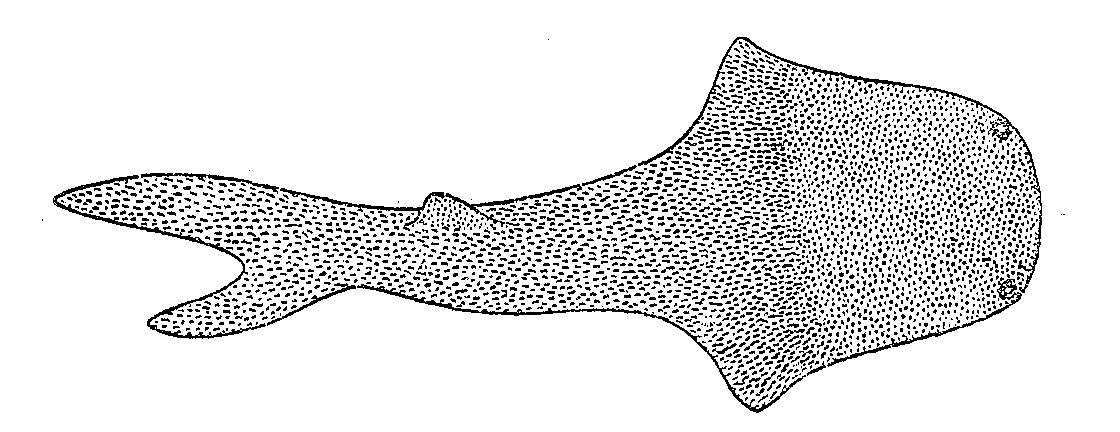
Loganellia scotica (Traquair, 1898), drawn by Traquair
