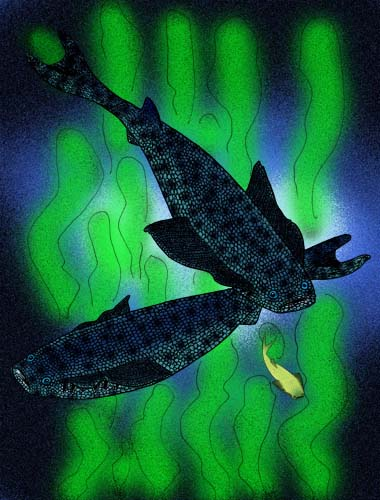
- Comparison of Thelodus and Loganellia

Scientific classification
- Kingdom: Animalia
- Phylum: Chordata
- Infraphylum: Agnatha
- Class: †Thelodonti
- Order: †Thelodontiformes; Kiaer, 1932

Families
- †Coelolepidae; †Eestilepididae; †Helenolepididae; †Longodidae; †Palaeodontidae; †Phlebolepididae; †Shieliidae; †Talivaliidae; †Turiniidae; Genera without placement in any family: †Katoporodus – †Kawalepsis

Synonyms
- †Coelolepidiformes Berg, 1937

= Thelodontiformes =

Extinct order of jawless fishes

Thelodontiformes is an extinct order of jawless fish of the Silurian.

Because the paucity of intact fossils, especially since some families are known entirely from scale fossils, taxonomy of thelodonts is based primarily on scale morphology. A recent assessment of thelodont taxonomy by Wilson and Märss in 2009 merges the orders Loganelliiformes, Katoporiida and Shieliiformes into Thelodontiformes, places families Lanarkiidae and Nikoliviidae into Furcacaudiformes (because of scale morphology) and establishes Archipelepidiformes as the basal-most order.

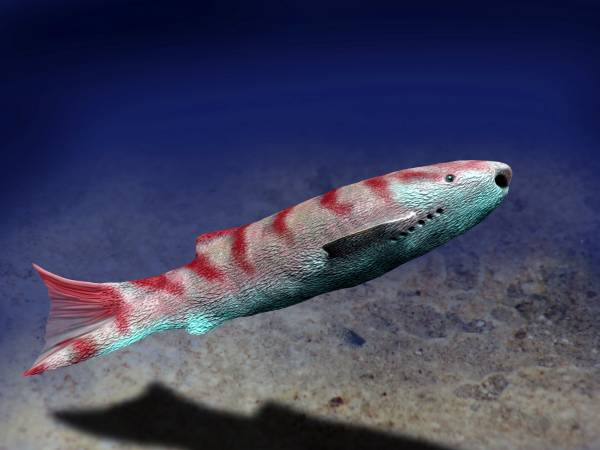
Life reconstruction of Phlebolepis elegans
