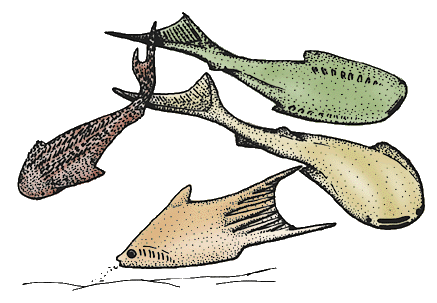
- Among the flat-bodied forms are Lanarkia (top left), provided with long, spine-shaped scales, and Loganellia (top right and middle). Other thelodonts, such as Furcacauda from the Devonian of Canada (bottom) are deep-bodied, with lateral gill openings and a very large, forked tail.

Scientific classification
- Kingdom: Animalia
- Phylum: Chordata
- Clade: Olfactores
- Subphylum: Vertebrata
- Infraphylum: Agnatha
- Class: †Thelodonti; Jaekel, 1911

Orders
- †Thelodontiformes; †Archipelepidiformes; †Furcacaudiformes

= Thelodonti =

Thelodonti Temporal range: Sandbian–Late Devonian, 458–359 Ma

Extinct class of jawless fishes

Thelodonti (from Greek: "nipple teeth") is a class of extinct Palaeozoic jawless fishes with distinctive scales instead of large plates of armor. These fish lived in both freshwater and marine environments, first appearing during the Late Ordovician, and perishing shortly after the Frasnian–Famennian extinction event in the Late Devonian.

There is much debate over whether the group represents a monophyletic grouping, or disparate stem groups to the major lines of jawless and jawed fish.

Thelodonts are united in possession of "thelodont scales". This defining character is not necessarily a result of shared ancestry, as it may have been evolved independently by different groups. Thus the thelodonts are sometimes thought to represent a polyphyletic group, although there is no firm agreement on this point. On the basis that they are monophyletic, they are reconstructed as being ancestrally marine and invading freshwater on multiple occasions.

"Thelodonts" were morphologically very similar, and probably closely related, to fish of the classes Heterostraci and Anaspida, differing mainly in their covering of distinctive, small, spiny scales. These scales were easily dispersed after death; their small size and resilience makes them the most common vertebrate fossil of their time.

Traditionally thelodonts were considered predominantly deposit-feeding bottom dwellers, but more recent studies have shown they occupied various ecological roles in various parts of the water column, much like modern bony fishes and sharks. In particular, a large variety of species preferred reef ecosystems, and it has been suggested that this preference was the reason for the development of their unique scales, protecting against abrasion and allowing for the development of more flexible bodies than other jawless fish, which had inflexible armors and were restricted to open habitats.

== Description ==
Very few complete thelodont specimens are known; fewer still are preserved in three dimensions. This is due in part to the lack of an internal ossified (i.e. bony) skeleton; it does not help that the scales are poorly, if at all, attached to one another, and that they readily detach from their owners upon death.

The exoskeleton is composed of many tooth-like scales, usually around 0.5–1.5mm in size. These scales did not overlap, and were aligned to point backwards along the fish, in the most streamlined direction, but beyond that, often appear haphazard in their orientation. The scales themselves approximate the form of a teardrop mounted on a small, bulky base, with the base often containing a small rootlet with which the scale was attached to the fish. The "teardrop" often contains lines, ridges, furrows and spikes running down its length in an array of sometimes complex patterns. Scales found around the gill region were generally smaller than the larger, bulkier scales found on the dorsal/ventral sides of the fish; some genera display rows of longer spikes.

The scaly covering contrasts them with most other jawless fishes, which were armor-plated with large, flat scales.

Aside from scattered scales, some specimens do appear to display imprints, giving an indication of the structure of the whole animal – which appeared to reach 15–30 cm in length. Tentative studies appear to suggest that the fish possessed a more developed braincase than the lampreys, with an almost shark-like outline. Internal scales have also been recovered, some fused into plates resembling gnathostome tooth-whorls to such a degree that some researchers favour a close link between the families.

Despite the rarity of complete fossils, these very rare intact specimens do allow us to gain an insight into the internal organ arrangement of the Thelodonts. Some specimens described in 1993 were the first to be found with a significant degree of three-dimensionality, ending speculations that the Thelodonts were flattened fish. Further, these fossils allowed the gut morphology to be interpreted, which generated much excitement: their guts were unlike those of any other agnathans, and a stomach was clearly visible: this was unexpected, as it was previously thought that stomachs evolved after jaws. Distinctive fork-shaped tails – usually characteristic of the jawed fish (gnathostomes) – were also found, linking the two groups to an unexpected degree.

The fins of the thelodonts are useful in reconstructing their mode of life. Their paired pectoral fins were combined with a single, usually well-developed, dorsal and anal fins; these and the hypercercal and much larger hypocercal lobes forming a heterocercal tail resemble features of modern fish that are associated with their deftness at predation and evasion.

=== Scales ===
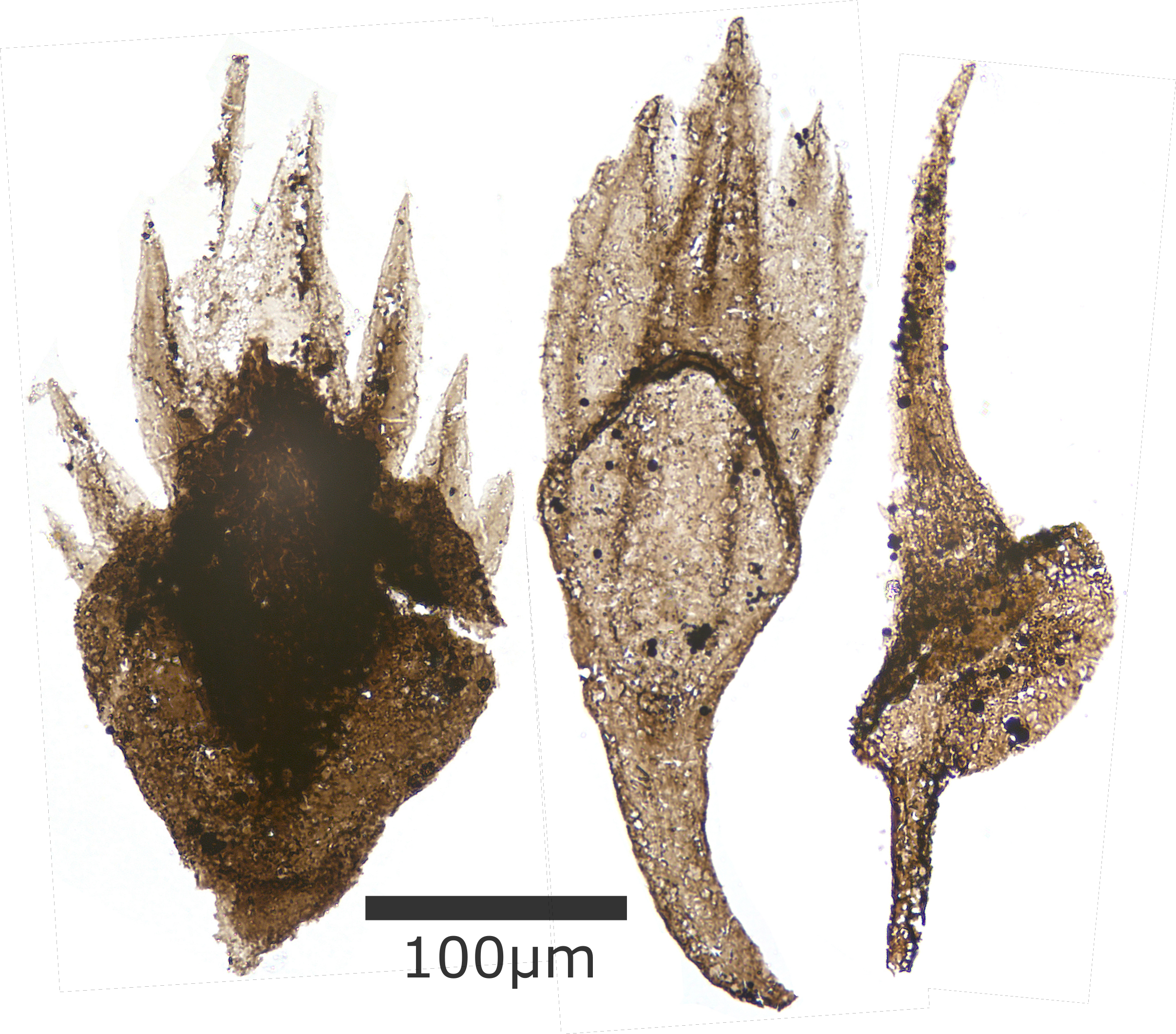
Left to right: denticles of Paralogania (?), Shielia taiti, Lanarkia horrida

The bony scales of the thelodont group, as the most abundant form of fossil, are also the best understood – and thus most useful. The scales were formed and shed throughout the organisms' lifetimes, and quickly separated after their death.

Bone – being one of the most resistant materials to the process of fossilisation – often preserves internal detail, which allows the histology and growth of the scales to be studied in detail. The scales consist of a non-growing "crown" composed of dentine, with a sometimes-ornamented enameloid upper surface and an aspidine (acellular bony tissue) base. Its growing base is made of cell-free bone, which sometimes developed anchorage structures to fix it in the side of the fish. Beyond that, there appear to be five types of bone-growth, which may represent five natural groupings within the thelodonts – or a spectrum ranging between the end members, meta- (or ortho-) dentine and mesodentine tissues. Each of the five scale morphs appears to resemble the scales of more derived groupings of fish, suggesting that thelodont groups may have been stem groups to succeeding clades of fish.

Scale morphology, alone, has limited value for distinguishing thelodont species. Within each organism, scale shape varies greatly according to body area, with intermediate scale forms appearing between different areas; furthermore, scale morphology may not even be constant within a given body area. To confuse things further, scale morphologies are not unique to specific taxa, and may be indistinguishable on the same area of two different species.

The morphology and histology of the thelodonts provides the main tool for quantifying their diversity and distinguishing between species – although ultimately using such convergent traits is prone to errors. Nonetheless, a framework of three groups has been proposed, based upon scale morphology and histology.

== Taxonomy ==
Due to the small number of intact fossils, the taxonomy of thelodonts is based primarily on scale morphology. In fact, some thelodont families are only recognised based on their scale fossils.

A recent assessment of thelodont taxonomy by Wilson and Märss in 2009 merges the orders Loganelliiformes, Katoporiida and Shieliiformes into Thelodontiformes, places families Lanarkiidae and Nikoliviidae into Furcacaudiformes on the basis of scale morphology, and establishes Archipelepidiformes as the basal-most order.

A newer taxonomy based on the work of Nelson, Grande and Wilson 2016 and van der Laan 2016.

- Superclass †Thelodontomorphi Jaekel 1911
  - Class †Thelodonti Kiaer 1932
    - Family †Oeseliidae Märss 2005
    - Order †Archipelepidiformes Wilson & Märss 2009
      - Family †Boothialepididae Märss 1999
      - Family †Archipelepididae Märss ex Soehn et al. 2001
    - Order †Furcacaudiformes Wilson & Caldwell 1998 (Fork-tailed thelodonts)
      - Family †Nikoliviidae Karatajūtė-Talimaa 1978
      - Family †Lanarkiidae Obručhev 1949
      - Family †Pezopallichthyidae Wilson & Caldwell 1998
      - Family †Drepanolepididae Wilson & Marss 2009
      - Family †Barlowodidae Märss, Wilson & Thorsteinsson 2002
      - Family †Apalolepididae Turner 1976
      - Family †Furcacaudidae Wilson & Caldwell 1998
    - Clade Thelodontida Stensiö 1958 non Kiaer 1932 s.l.
      - Family †Talivaliidae Marss, Wilson & Thorsteinsson 2002
      - Family †Longodidae Märss 2006b
      - Family †Helenolepididae Wilson & Märss 2009
      - Order †Sandiviiformes Karatajūtė-Talimaa & Märss 2004
        - Family †Angaralepididae Karatajūtė-Talimaa & Märss 2004
        - Family †Stroinolepididae Karatajūtė-Talimaa & Märss 2002
        - Family †Sandiviidae Karatajūtė-Talimaa & Märss 2004
      - Order †Turiniida Stensiö 1958
        - Family †Turiniidae Obručhev 1964
      - Order †Thelodontiformes
        - Family †Thelodontidae Jordan 1905
      - Order †Loganelliiformes Turner 1991
        - Family †Nunavutiidae Marss, Wilson & Thorsteinsson 2002
        - Family †Loganelliidae Märss, Wilson & Thorsteinsson 2002
      - Order †Phlebolepidiformes Berg 1937 s.s.
        - Family †Phlebolepididae Berg 1937 corrig.
        - Family †Shieliidae Märss, Wilson & Thorsteinsson 2002
        - Family †Katoporodidae Soehn et al. 2001 ex Märss, Wilson & Thorsteinsson 2002

The following cladogram, simplified from Ferrón et al. (2018), reflects the analysis of Wilson & Märss (2009):

- Thelodonti
  - Archipelepidiformes
  - - Furcacaudiformes
      - Nikoliviidae
      - - Lanarkiidae
        - - Pezopallichthyidae
          - - Drepanolepididae
            - - Barlowodidae
              - - Apalolepididae
                - Furcacaudidae
    - Thelodontiformes
      - Talivaliidae?
      - - Turiniidae
        - - Coelolepidae
          - - Loganelliidae
            - - Longodidae
              - - Helenolepididae
                - - Phlebolepididae
                  - Shieliidae

Phylogeny of jawless fish after Reeves and colleagues 2023:

- Vertebrata total group
  - †Haikouella
  - - †Metaspriggina
    - †Myllokunmingiida
    - Vertebrata crown group
      - Cyclostomi total group
        - †Anaspida
          - †Birkeniida
          - - †Lasanius
            - - †Jamoytius
              - †Euphanerops
        - - †Euconodonta
          - Cyclostomi crown group
            - Myxinoidea
            - Petromyzontida
      - Gnathostomata total group
        - †Pteraspidomorphi
          - †Astraspis
          - - †Arandaspida
            - †Heterostraci
        - - †Thelodonti
            - †Furcacaudiformes
            - †Thelodontiformes
          - - †Pituriaspida
            - - †Galeaspida
              - - †Osteostraci
                - Gnathostomata (traditional usage)
                  - †Antiarchi
                  - - †Arthrodira
                    - Gnathostomata crown group
                      - Osteichthyes
                      - Chondrichthyes

== Ecology ==
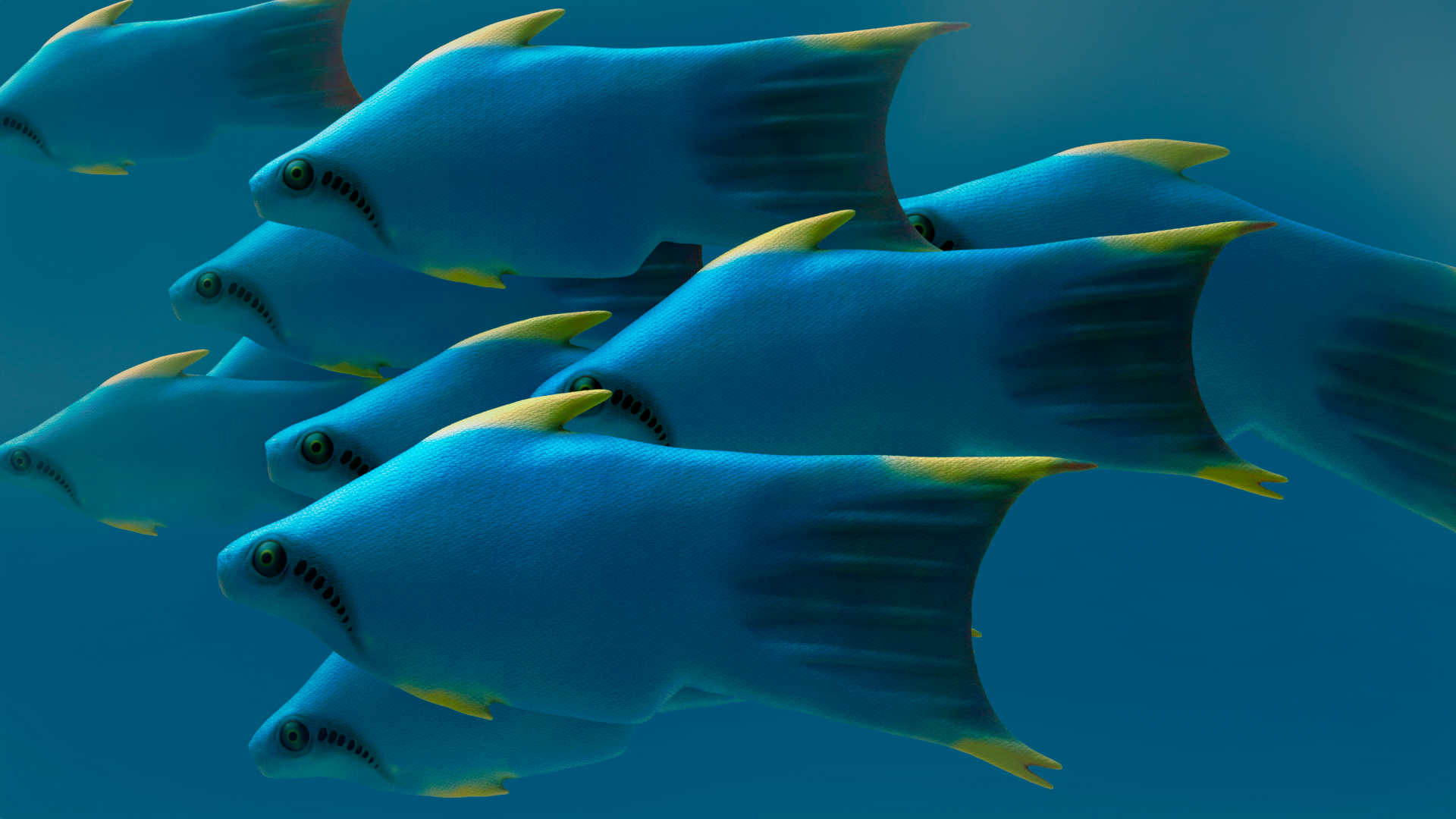
Furcacauda fredholmae

Thelodonts displayed similar squamation patterns as modern sharks, so functionally they served a similar role. This allows for a clearer observation of their ecological niches. In particular, protection against abrasion seems to have been the original role for these scales.

Most thelodonts were considered deposit feeders, but more recent studies have shown that several species were active swimmers and thus more pelagic. A large variety of species in particular preferred reef ecosystems. They are mainly known from open shelf environments, but are also found nearer the shore and in some freshwater settings. The appearance of the same species in fresh- and salt-water settings has led to suggestions that some thelodonts migrated into fresh water, perhaps to spawn. However, the transition from fresh- to salt- water should be observable, as the scales' composition would change to reflect the different environment. This compositional change has not yet been found.

== Utility as biostratigraphic markers ==
Thelodont scales are globally widespread during the Silurian and Early Devonian times, becoming restricted in range to Gondwana, until their extinction in the Late Devonian (Frasnian). The morphology of some species diversified rapidly enough for the scales to rival the conodonts in utility as biostratigraphic markers, allowing precise correlation of widely spaced sediments.

== Evolutionary patterns ==
The first major pattern or group of jawless fish with exoskeletons or plated armour, was the Laurentian group, which existed during the Cambrian-Ordovician time. However, the thelodonts (as well as the conodonts, placoderms, acanthodians, and chondrichthyans) are the second major group which are believed to have emerged in the middle Ordovician and lasted near the Late Devonian period. Due to their similar characteristics and chronological time frame of existence, many believe the thelodonts have Laurentian origins.

The oldest named thelodonts are from the Sandbian stage of the Late Ordovician: Larolepis (from St. Joseph Island, Canada) and Stroinolepis (from Severnaya Zemlya, Russia). Both belong to the family Loganelliidae. This family is not the earliest-diverging group of thelodonts, suggesting that their origin goes back further. The two earliest-diverging thelodont groups, the archipelepidiforms and furcacaudiforms, are mainly distributed in Laurentia (the ancient tropical continent roughly equivalent to North America), with only the latter dispersing to nearby continents a few times. Thelodontiforms, on the other hand, may have originated from Baltica (equivalent to much of Eastern Europe). Thelodontiforms attained a much wider distribution than the other two orders, despite not appearing to be adapted for active swimming as adults. Their ability to reach new regions relate to new dispersal adaptations in their larvae. Thelodonts reached their maximum diversity in the Early Devonian only to decline sharply afterwards. The last named thelodont is Arianalepis, a turiniid which managed to survive until the Famennian (the last stage of the Devonian) in Iran and Australia.

== See also ==
- List of thelodont genera
- Morphometrics
