= Taxonomy of fish =

Fishes are a paraphyletic group and for this reason, the class Pisces seen in older reference works is no longer used in formal taxonomy. Traditional classification divides fish into three extant classes (Agnatha, Chondrichthyes, and Osteichthyes), and with extinct forms sometimes classified within those groups, sometimes as their own classes:

Fish account for more than half of vertebrate species. As of 2016, there are over 32,000 described species of bony fish, over 1,100 species of cartilaginous fish, and over 100 hagfish and lampreys. A third of these fall within the nine largest families; from largest to smallest, these are Cyprinidae, Gobiidae, Cichlidae, Characidae, Loricariidae, Balitoridae, Serranidae, Labridae, and Scorpaenidae. About 64 families are monotypic, containing only one species.

- Class "Agnatha" (jawless fish, paraphyletic)
  - Subclass Cyclostomata (hagfish and lampreys)
  - Subclass †"Ostracodermi" (armoured jawless fish, paraphyletic)
- Class Chondrichthyes (cartilaginous fish)
  - Subclass Elasmobranchii (sharks and rays)
  - Subclass Holocephali (chimaeras and extinct relatives)
- Class †"Placodermi" (armoured fish, paraphyletic)
- Class †"Acanthodii" ("spiny sharks", sometimes classified under Actinopterygii and paraphyletic)
- Superclass Osteichthyes (bony fish)
  - Class Actinopterygii (ray-finned fish)
  - Clade Sarcopterygii (lobe-finned fish and tetrapods)

The above scheme is the one most commonly encountered in non-specialist and general works. Many of the above groups are paraphyletic, in that they have given rise to successive groups: Agnatha are ancestral to Placodermi, who again have given rise to Osteichthyes, as well as to Acanthodii, the ancestors of Chondrichthyes. With the arrival of phylogenetic nomenclature, the fishes has been split up into a more detailed scheme, with the following major groups:

- Class Myxini (hagfish)
- Class †Pteraspidomorphi (early jawless fish)
- Class †Thelodonti
- Class †Anaspida
- Class Petromyzontida or Hyperoartia
  - Family Petromyzontidae (lampreys)
- Class †Conodonta (conodonts)
- Class †Cephalaspidomorphi (early jawless fish)
  - Clade †Galeaspida
  - Clade †Pituriaspida
  - Clade †Osteostraci
- Infraphylum Gnathostomata (jawed vertebrates)
  - Class †"Placodermi" (armoured fish, paraphyletic)
  - Class Chondrichthyes (cartilaginous fish)
  - Class †"Acanthodii" (spiny sharks, paraphyletic)
  - Superclass Osteichthyes (bony fish)
    - Class Actinopterygii (ray-finned fish)
      - Subclass Chondrostei
        - Order Acipenseriformes (sturgeons and paddlefishes)
        - Order Polypteriformes (reedfishes and bichirs).
      - Subclass Neopterygii
        - Infraclass Holostei (gars and bowfins)
        - Infraclass Teleostei (many orders of common fish)
    - Class Sarcopterygii (lobe-finned fish and tetrapods)
      - Subclass Actinistia (coelacanths)
      - Subclass Dipnoi (lungfish, sister group to the tetrapods)

† – indicates extinct taxon
Some palaeontologists contend that because Conodonta are chordates, they are primitive fish. For a fuller treatment of this taxonomy, see the vertebrate article.

The position of hagfish in the phylum Chordata is not settled. Phylogenetic research in 1998 and 1999 supported the idea that the hagfish and the lampreys form a natural group, the Cyclostomata, that is a sister group of the Gnathostomata.
