= Ramsaasalepis =

Ramsaasalepis Temporal range: Upper Silurian

Scientific classification
- Kingdom: Animalia
- Phylum: Chordata
- Infraphylum: Agnatha
- Superclass: †Anaspidomorphi
- Class: †Anaspida
- Order: †Birkeniiformes
- Family: †Ramsaasalepididae; Blom, Märss & Miller, 2002
- Genus: †Ramsaasalepis; Blom, Märss & Miller, 2002

Species
- †Ramsaasalepis porosa Blom et al., 2002 (type)

Genus of Anaspida

Ramsaasalepis is an extinct genus of jawless fish that lived during the Silurian period, approximately 427-419 million years ago. It is the type and the only known genus of the family Ramsaasalepididae, one of many families of prehistoric jawless fish, and contains the single species Ramsaasalepis porosa.

It was described based on a number of fossilized, disarticulated thelodont scales that may have had a ridged texture. The species had a well-developed vascular canal system. However, unlike most other Agnathans, Ramsaasalepis porosa possessed neither bony armor nor dermal development typical of the Infraphylum. Based on these characteristics and its stratigraphical range, it is speculated to be most closely related to the genera Septentrionia and Tahulalepis.

Ramsaasalepis would likely have been found in nutrient-rich, shallow oceanic waters. It has been speculated to have ranged around 10 to 15 cm (4 to 6 in) in length. Competition with recently evolved jawed fish, and changing sea levels have been suggested as reasons for the extinction of this and many other jawless fish species. It was probably a filter feeder or a scavenger.

== Discovery ==
Ramsaasalepis was discovered in Skåne, Sweden, by paleontologists Henning Blom, Tiiu Märss, and Carl Miller in 2003. The species' name derives from porosus, the Latin word for 'porous', and Ramsåsa, the municipality in which it was discovered.
