= Cristozoa =

Scientific classification
- Kingdom: Animalia
- Phylum: Chordata
- Clade: Cristozoa

Included groups
- Yunnanozoon(=Haikouella); Vertebrate; Cyclostomata; Myxini; Petromyzontiformes; Ostracodermi(paraphyletic); Gnathostomata

Proposed clade of chordates

Cristozoa (also known as crest animals) is a grouping of animals possessing a neural crest and derivatives.

It includes all the Craniata, as well as their immediate precraniate precursors. The precraniate crest animals, such as Yunnanozoon, are all extinct and found only in Early Cambrian strata of Yunnan (southwestern China).This group is now considered to be paraphyletic as new studies indicate that Yunnanozoon occupies more basal position in the phylum Chordata than previously thought.
