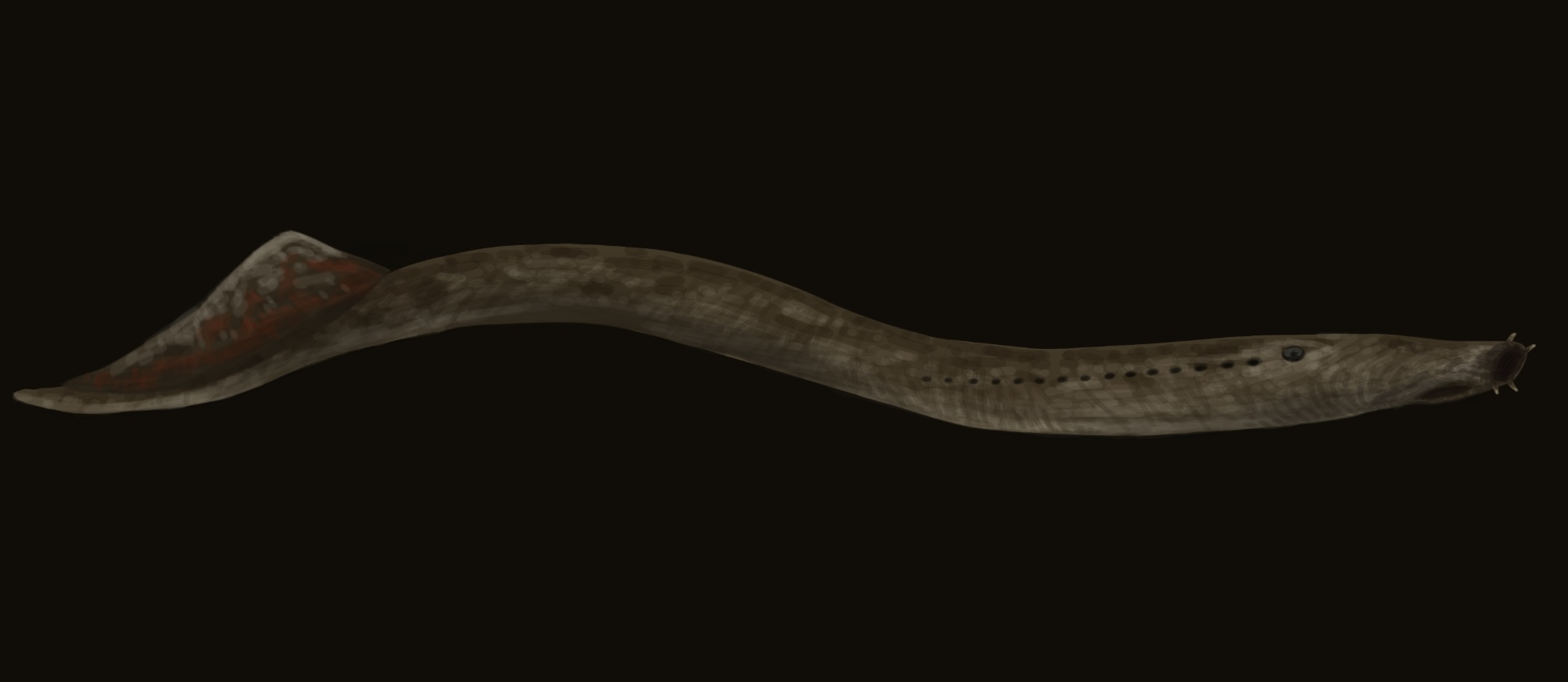
- Life restoration

Scientific classification
- Kingdom: Animalia
- Phylum: Chordata
- Infraphylum: Agnatha
- Superclass: †Anaspidomorphi
- Order: †Jamoytiiformes (?)
- Family: †Achanarellidae
- Genus: †Achanarella
- Species: †A. trewini

Binomial name
- †Achanarella trewini Newman, 2002

= Achanarella =

Achanarella Temporal range: Middle Devonian

Extinct species of jawless fish

Achanarella is a genus of extinct jawless fish from the Achanarras Quarry in Scotland, of which the name is derived, dating to the Middle Devonian. The only known species in the genus is Achanarella trewini.

== History of research ==
Achanarella was first referenced in 1978 by Jack Saxon, but was only briefly described. The name was used again in a paper from 1986, but it was in reference to poorly preserved specimens that could not be used for formal diagnosis. Achanarella trewini was finally described as a new genus and species in 2002 by Michael J. Newman based on new and better preserved fossils.

It was proposed in 1996 that the known Achanarella specimens may actually be heavily decayed acanthodians. This idea was later argued against on the basis that Achanarella fossils do not follow decay patterns that acanthodians, like the contemporary Mesacanthus, displayed in their fossils. This was further supported due to the fact that its branchial openings were small and uniform in size compared to the larger, more irregular holes found in decayed fish.

== Description ==
Achanarella was a small, slender jawless fish. It ranged from 20–90mm long. Overall, its form was similar to a lamprey. It had a caudal fin, anal fin, and possibly a small dorsal fin. Its eyes were large and it had a rimmed, circular mouth on the end of its head. It had a branchial basket, though it is hard to define exactly in the fossil. Thirteen branchial openings, and possibly associated branchial arches, are discernible, but there may be over twenty.

== Taxonomy ==
Achanarella is able to be placed under Chordata with reasonable confidence due to its apparent bilateral symmetry and paired gill openings. Though a notochord is not present, epichordal fin supports are, which are also seen in vertebrates Endeiolepis and Cornovicthys. The overall morphology of Achnarella is also comparable to other early vertebrates like Jamoytius, so it is justified to assume that Achanarella was also a vertebrate.

The presence of an unidentifiable tube, leading from the branchial openings to the head, may suggest a piston cartilage as in Mayomyzon. This would suggest Achanarella is a close relative of lampreys, though the true function of the tube structure is not for certain. Instead, Euphaneropidae most closely resembles Achanarella, though the body proportions are different between them. Achanarella was placed within its own family Achanarellidae, which is under Jamoytiiformes.
