= Septentrion =

Septentrion may refer to:

- Septentrional, a Latinate word once used in English and French to refer to northern regions
- Septentrionalist, referring to the Viking revival of the 18th and 19th centuries
- Operation Septentrion, a 2009 ISAF military operation in Afghanistan
- Septentrional-Oriente fault zone, a geological fault in the Caribbean

== Arts and entertainment ==
- Septentrion (album), by Anodajay, 2006
- Septentrión, an album by Anima Mundi, 2002
- Septentrion (video game), or SOS, a 1993 video game
- Septentrion, a 2009 book by Jean Raspail
- Septentriones, fictional creatures in the video game Shin Megami Tensei: Devil Survivor 2

== See also ==
- Septentrioniidae, an extinct family of jawless fish
  - Septentrionia, a genus in the family Septentrioniidae
