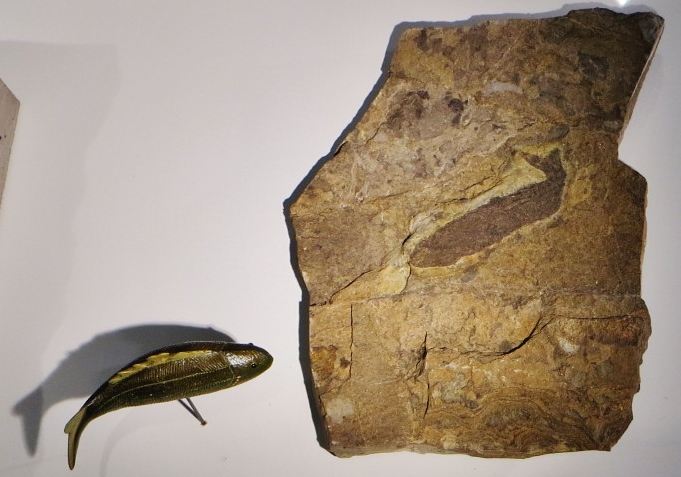
- Fossil and model of Birkenia elegans

Scientific classification
- Kingdom: Animalia
- Phylum: Chordata
- Infraphylum: Agnatha
- Superclass: †Anaspidomorphi
- Class: †Anaspida
- Order: †Birkeniiformes
- Family: †Birkeniidae; Traquair, 1899

Genera
- †Birkenia; †Ctenopleuron; †Saarolepis; †Vilkitskilepis

Synonyms
- Anaspididae non Thompson 1893; Procephalaspididae Stensiö 1958

= Birkeniidae =

Extinct family of jawless fishes

Birkeniidae is an extinct family of jawless fish belonging to the order Birkeniiformes. They were defined in 1899 by Ramsay H. Traquair, and were a successful family among the many jawless fish in the Silurian seas.

== Morphology ==
Birkeniidae had large oval bodies and strong mobile tails. Their eyes were positioned on either side of the head. Their mouth was large for the jawless fish, but contained no teeth. Birkeniidae are distinguished by the crown shaped projection on their back, and the other smaller projections which run down its tail. They also possessed fins which faced downwards, an uncommon trait among the jawless fish. They had typical scaly skin.
