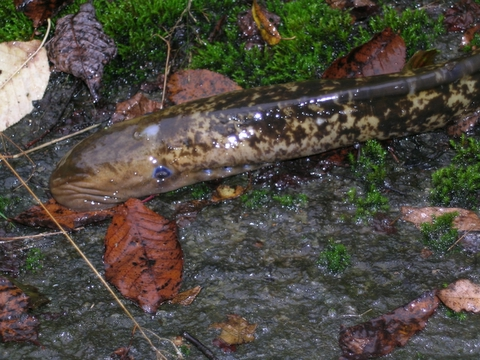
- Sea lamprey from Sweden

Scientific classification
- Kingdom: Animalia
- Phylum: Chordata
- Infraphylum: Agnatha
- Superclass: Cyclostomi; Duméril, 1806

Classes
- Myxini (hagfishes); Petromyzontida (lampreys)

= Cyclostomi =

Cyclostomes Temporal range: Lochkovian - Recent 419.2–0 Ma

Superclass of jawless fishes

Cyclostomi, often referred to as Cyclostomata (/sɪkloʊˈstɒmətə/, from Ancient Greek κύκλος (kúklos), meaning "circle", and στόμα (stóma), meaning "mouth", and thus, "circular mouth") is a superclass of vertebrates that comprises the living jawless fish classes: the lampreys and hagfishes. Both groups have jawless mouths with horny epidermal structures that function as teeth called ceratodontes, and branchial arches that are internally positioned instead of external as in the related jawed fishes.

== Possible external relationships ==
This taxon is often included in the paraphyletic infraphylum Agnatha, which also includes several groups of extinct armored fishes called ostracoderms. Most fossil agnathans, such as galeaspids, thelodonts, and osteostracans, are more closely related to vertebrates with jaws (called gnathostomes) than to cyclostomes.

Biologists historically disagreed on whether cyclostomes are a clade. The "vertebrate hypothesis" held that lampreys are more closely related to gnathostomes than they are to the hagfish. The "cyclostome hypothesis", on the other hand, holds that lampreys and hagfishes are more closely related, making Cyclostomi monophyletic.

Most studies based on anatomy have supported the vertebrate hypothesis, while most molecular phylogenies have supported the cyclostome hypothesis.

There are exceptions in both cases, however. Similarities in the cartilage and muscles of the tongue apparatus also provide evidence of sister-group relationship between lampreys and hagfishes. At least one molecular phylogeny has supported the vertebrate hypothesis. The embryonic development of hagfishes was once held to be drastically different from that of lampreys and gnathostomes, but recent evidence suggests that it is more similar than previously thought, which may remove an obstacle to the cyclostome hypothesis.

Several groups of Palaeozoic jawless fish have been suggested to be more closely related to cyclostomes than to jawed fish, including conodonts and anaspids. The presence of mineralised elements in these jawless fish, like the oral conodont elements and the armoured body covering of anaspids and scutes on other species like Lasanius suggests that mineralised tissues were present in the last common ancestor of all vertebrates, but were secondarily lost in hagfish and lampreys.

== Internal differences and similarities ==
Both hagfishes and lampreys have a single gonad, but for different reasons. In hagfishes the left gonad degenerates during their ontogeny and only the right gonad develops, whereas in lampreys the left and right gonads fuse into one. There are no gonoducts present.

Hagfishes have direct development, but lamprey go through a larval stage followed by metamorphosis into a juvenile form (or adult form in the non-parasitic species). Lamprey larvae live in freshwater and are called ammocoetes, and are the only vertebrates with an endostyle, an organ used for filter feeding that is otherwise found only in tunicates and lancelets. During metamorphosis, the lamprey endostyle develops into the thyroid gland.

The Cyclostomi evolved oxygen transport hemoglobins independently from the jawed vertebrates.

Hagfishes and lampreys lack a thymus, spleen, myelin and sympathetic chain ganglia. Neither species has internal eye muscles and hagfishes also lack external eye muscles. Both groups have only a single olfactory organ with a single nostril. The nasal duct ends blindly in a pouch in lampreys but opens into the pharynx in hagfishes. The branchial basket (reduced in hagfishes) is attached to the cranium.

The common ancestor of both cyclostomes and gnathostomes went through a genome duplication before their split, and while a second genome duplication occurred in the stem-gnathostomes, the stem-cyclostomes experienced an independent genome triplication.

The mouth apparatus in hagfishes and adult lampreys has some similarities, but differ from one another. Lampreys have tooth plates on the top of a tongue-like piston cartilage, and the hagfish have a fixed cartilaginous plate on the floor of its mouth with groves that allows tooth plates to slide backwards and forwards over it like a conveyor belt, and are everted as they move over the edge of the plate. Hagfishes also have a keratinous palatine tooth hanging from the roof of the mouth.

Unlike jawed vertebrates, which have three semicircular canals in each inner ear, lampreys have only two and hagfishes just one. The semicircular canal of hagfishes contains both stereocilia and a second class of hair cells, apparently a derived trait, whereas lampreys and other vertebrates have stereocilia only. Because the inner ear of hagfishes has two forms of sensory ampullae, their single semicircular canal is assumed to be a result of two semicircular canals that have merged into just one.

The hagfish blood is isotonic with seawater, while lampreys appears to use the same gill-based mechanisms of osmoregulation as marine teleosts. Yet the same mechanisms are apparent in the mitochondria-rich cells in the gill epithelia of hagfishes, but never develops the ability to regulate the blood's salinity, even if they are capable of regulating the ionic concentration of Ca and Mg ions. It has been suggested that the hagfish ancestors evolved from an anadromous or freshwater species that has since adapted to saltwater over a very long time, resulting in higher electrolyte levels in its blood.

The lamprey intestine has a typhlosole that increases the inner surface like the spiral valve does in some jawed vertebrates. The spiral valve in the latter develops by twisting the whole gut, while the lamprey typhlosole is confined to the mucous membrane of the intestines. The mucous membranes of hagfishes have a primitive typhlosole in the form of permanent zigzag ridges. This trait could be a primitive one, since it is also found in some sea squirts such as Ciona. The intestinal epithelia of lampreys also have ciliated cells, which have not been detected in hagfishes. Because ciliated intestines are also found in Chondrostei, lungfishes and the early stages of some teleosts, it is considered a primitive condition that has been lost in hagfishes.

== Phylogeny ==
After Miyashita et al. 2019.

- - †Haikouella
  - - - †Haikouichthys
      - †Myllokunmingia
    - - †Metaspriggina
      - Vertebrata (crown group)
        - Gnathostomata (jawed vertebrates)
        - - †Anaspida
            - †Cornovichthys
            - - - †Achanarella
                - †Ciderius
              - - †Birkeniida
                - - †Lasanius
                  - - †Euphanerops
                    - †Jamoytius
          - - †Pipiscius
            - - †Conodonta (conodonts)
              - Cyclostomi (crown group)
                - - †Myxinikela
                  - Myxini (crown group)
                    - - †Tethymyxine tapirostrum
                      - - Rubicundus eos
                        - Rubicundus lopheliae
                    - - - Myxine glutinosa
                        - Neomyxine biniplicata
                      - - Eptatretus stoutii
                        - - Eptatretus burgeri
                          - "Paramyxine" spp.
                - - †Gilpichthys
                  - - - †Hardistiella
                      - †Mayomyzon
                    - - †Myxineidus
                      - - †Priscomyzon
                        - - †Mesomyzon
                          - Petromyzontida (crown group)
                            - - Geotria australis
                              - Mordacia mordax
                            - - Petromyzon marinus
                              - - Lampetra fluviatilis
                                - Lethenteron camtschaticum

Cladogram after Reeves and colleagues, 2023:

- Vertebrata total group
  - †Haikouella
  - - †Metaspriggina
    - †Myllokunmingiida
    - Vertebrata crown group
      - Cyclostomi total group
        - †Anaspida
          - †Birkeniida
          - - †Lasanius
            - - †Jamoytius
              - †Euphanerops
        - - †Euconodonta
          - Cyclostomi crown group
            - Myxinoidea
            - Petromyzontida
      - Gnathostomata total group
        - †Pteraspidomorphi
          - †Astraspis
          - - †Arandaspida
            - †Heterostraci
        - - †Thelodonti
            - †Furcacaudiformes
            - †Thelodontiformes
          - - †Pituriaspida
            - - †Galeaspida
              - - †Osteostraci
                - Gnathostomata (traditional usage)
                  - †Antiarchi
                  - - †Arthrodira
                    - Gnathostomata crown group
                      - Osteichthyes
                      - Chondrichthyes
