= Ctenopleuron =

Ctenopleuron Temporal range: Silurian

Scientific classification
- Kingdom: Animalia
- Phylum: Chordata
- Infraphylum: Agnatha
- Superclass: †Anaspidomorphi
- Class: †Anaspida
- Order: †Birkeniiformes
- Family: †Birkeniidae
- Genus: †Ctenopleuron; Matthew, 1907
- Species: †C. nerepisense

Binomial name
- †Ctenopleuron nerepisense Matthew, 1907

Extinct genus of jawless fishes

Ctenopleuron is an extinct genus of jawless fish in the class Anaspida. It is considered to have existed in the Paleozoic epoch between 423 and 419 Ma.
