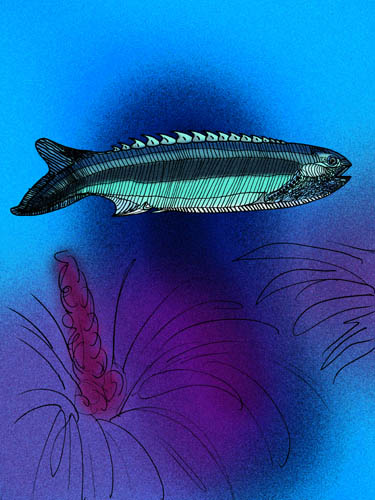
- Reconstruction of the anaspid agnathan Pterygolepis nitida, of Late Silurian Europe

Scientific classification
- Kingdom: Animalia
- Phylum: Chordata
- Infraphylum: Agnatha
- Superclass: †Anaspidomorphi
- Class: †Anaspida
- Order: †Birkeniiformes
- Family: †Pterygolepididae; Obručhev 1964 corrig.
- Genus: †Pterygolepis; Cossmann, 1920
- Species: †P. nitidus

Binomial name
- †Pterygolepis nitidus (Kiær 1911)

Synonyms
- †Pterolepis Kiaer, 1911 non Rambur 1838; †Pterolepidops Fowler 1947; †Pterolepis nitida Kiær 1911; †Pterolepidops nitida (Kiær1911) Fowler 1947

= Pterygolepis =

Extinct genus of jawless fishes

Pterygolepis is an extinct genus of jawless fish belonging to the order Birkeniiformes.

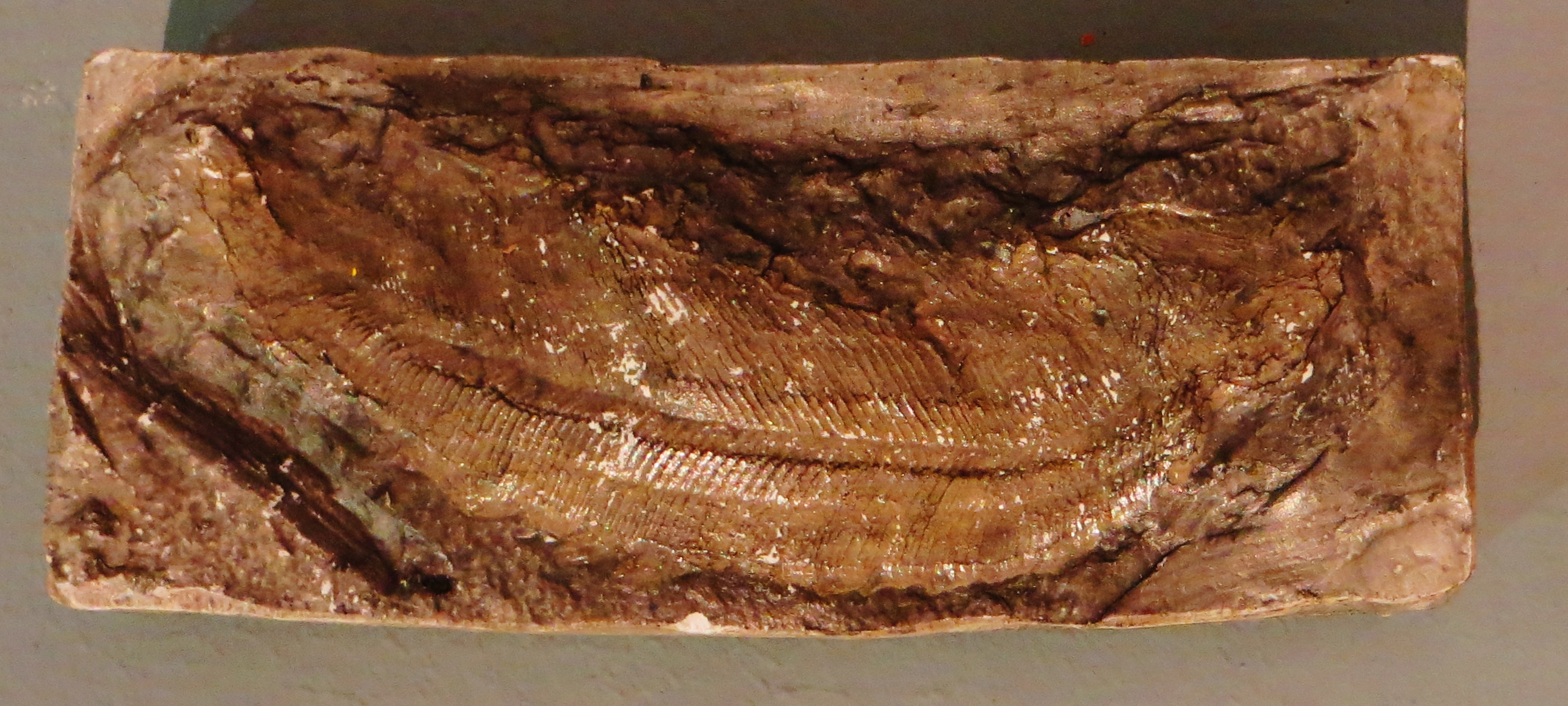
Fossil of Pterygolepis nitidus, an extinct fish. Took the picture at Museum of Paleontology, Tübingen

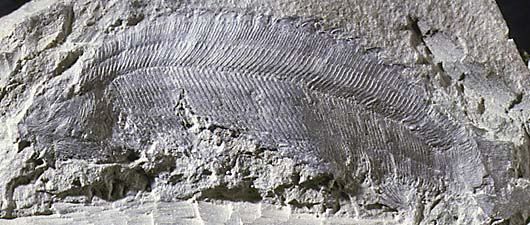
Pterygolepis nitidus from Lower Silurian of Norway
