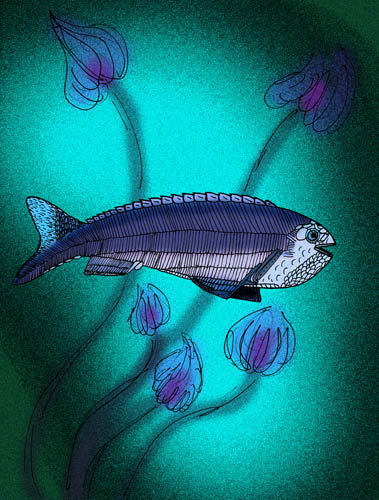
- Cowielepis

Scientific classification
- Kingdom: Animalia
- Phylum: Chordata
- Infraphylum: Agnatha
- Superclass: †Anaspidomorphi
- Class: †Anaspida; Traquair, 1899

Type species
- †Birkenia elegans Traquair 1898

Orders
- Endeiolepidiformes; Birkeniiformes

Synonyms
- Anaspidi; Birkeniae

= Anaspida =

Anaspida Temporal range: 444–358.9 Ma early Silurian - Late Devonian

Group of extinct jawless vertebrates

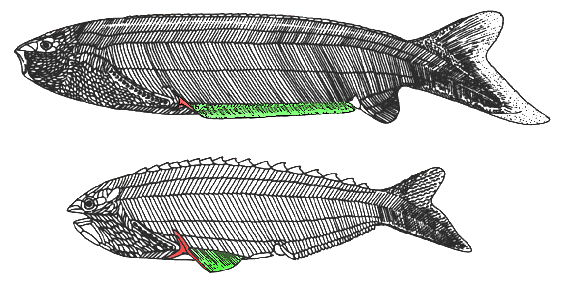
Anaspids are characterized by a large, tri-radiate spine (red) posteriorly to the series of branchial openings. It is assumed that the most primitive anaspids, such as Pharyngolepis (top), possessed a long, ribbon-shaped, ventrolateral fin-fold (green). More advanced forms, such as Rhyncholepis (bottom), possessed a shorter paired fin-fold (green) and enlarged, spine-shaped, median dorsal scutes. – Philippe Janvier

Anaspida ("shieldless ones") is an extinct group of jawless fish that existed from the early Silurian period to the late Devonian period. They were classically regarded as the ancestors of lampreys, but this is denied in recent phylogenetic analyses, although some analyses show these groups would be at least related. Anaspids were small marine fish that lacked a heavy bony shield and paired fins, but were distinctively hypocercal.

== Anatomy ==
Compared to many other ostracoderms, such as the Heterostraci and Osteostraci, anaspids did not possess a bony shield or armor, hence their name. The anaspid head and body are instead covered in an array of small, weakly mineralized scales, with a row of massive scutes running down the back, and, at least confirmed among the birkeniids, the body was covered in rows of tile-like scales made of aspidine, an acellular bony tissue. Anaspids all had prominent, laterally placed eyes with no scleral ring, with the gills opened as a row of holes along either side of the animal, typically numbering anywhere from 6-15 pairs. The major synapomorphy for the anaspids is the large, tri-radiate spine behind the series of the gill openings.

== Taxonomy ==
Now that Jamoytius and its close cohorts, i.e., Euphanerops, have been moved to Jamoytiiformes, Class Anaspida now consists of two orders, the monogeneric Lasaniida, which contains the genus Lasanius and represents a basal anaspid group, and Birkeniida, which contains all other recognized anaspid taxa. Birkeniida is further divided into several families, including Birkeniidae, Pterygolepididae, Rhyncholepididae and Pharyngolepididae, which contain those taxa known from whole body fossils (in addition to several taxa known only from scales) and the family Septentrioniidae, whose subtaxa are known exclusively from scales. Two recently described genera, Kerreralepis and Cowielepis, are considered to be Birkeniida incertae sedis.

Some recent studies have suggested that anaspids are stem-cyclostomes, more closely related to hagfish and lampreys than to jawed fish.

A newer taxonomy based on the work of Mikko's Phylogeny Archive, Nelson, Grande and Wilson 2016 and van der Laan 2018.

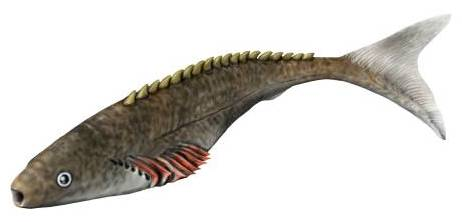
Life reconstruction of Lasanius problematicus

- Class †Anaspida Janvier 1996 non Williston 1917
  - Order †Endeiolepidiformes Berg 1940
    - Family †Endeiolepididae Stensiö 1939 corrig.
      - Genus †Endeiolepis Stensiö 1939
  - Order †Birkeniiformes Berg 1940
    - Genus †Cowielepis Blom 2008
    - Genus †Hoburgilepis Blom, Märss & Miller 2002
    - Genus †Kerreralepis Blom 2012
    - Genus †Maurylepis Blom, Märss & Miller 2002
    - Genus †Rytidolepis Pander 1856
    - Genus †Schidiosteus Pander 1856
    - Genus †Silmalepis Blom, Märss & Miller 2002
    - Genus †Vesikulepis Blom, Märss & Miller 2002
    - Family †Pharyngolepididae Kiær 1924 corrig.
      - Genus †Pharyngolepis Kiaer 1911
    - Family †Pterygolepididae Obručhev 1964 corrig.
      - Genus †Pterygolepis Cossmann 1920 [Pterolepis Kiaer 1911 non Rambur 1838 non De Candolle ex Miquel 1840; Pterolepidops Fowler 1947]
    - Family †Rhyncholepididae Kiær 1924 corrig.
      - Genus †Rhyncholepis Kiær 1911 non Miquel 1843 non Nuttall 1841
    - Family †Tahulalepididae Blom, Märss & Miller 2002
      - Genus †Tahulalepis Blom, Märss & Miller 2002
      - Genus †Trimpleylepis Miller, Märss & Blom 2004
    - Family †Lasaniidae Goodrich 1909
      - Genus †Lasanius Traquair 1898
    - Family †Ramsaasalepididae Blom, Märss & Miller 2003
      - Genus †Ramsaasalepis Blom, Märss & Miller 2003
    - Family †Birkeniidae Traquair 1899
      - Genus ?†Vilkitskilepis Märss 2002
      - Genus †Ctenopleuron Matthew 1907
      - Genus †Saarolepis Robertson 1945 [Anaspis Robertson 1941 non Geoffroy 1762 non Thomson 1893]
      - Genus †Birkenia Traquair 1898
    - Family †Septentrioniidae Blom, Märss & Miller 2002
      - Genus †Liivilepis Blom, Märss & Miller 2002
      - Genus †Manbrookia Blom, Märss & Miller 2002
      - Genus †Ruhnulepis Blom, Märss & Miller 2002
      - Genus †Spokoinolepis Blom, Märss & Miller 2002
      - Genus †Septentrionia Blom, Märss & Miller 2002
