= Ciderius =

Ciderius Temporal range: Wenlock, ~428–423 Ma
- Life reconstruction of C. cooperi

Scientific classification
- Kingdom: Animalia
- Phylum: Chordata
- Superclass: †Anaspidomorphi
- Order: †Euphanerida
- Family: †Euphaneropidae
- Genus: †Ciderius van der Brugghen, 2015

Type species
- †Ciderius cooperi van der Brugghen, 2015

Extinct genus of jawless fishes

Ciderius is an extinct genus of jawless fish from the family Euphaneropidae, being the oldest known member of the family. It is known from the Lower Silurian Fish Bed Formation of Scotland, and the genus name is derived from cider, due to its resemblance to a bottle, a barrel and a pair of apples when flattened.

== Discovery and naming ==
The earliest discovered specimens belonging to Ciderius were discovered during the early 20th century, and the genus is known exclusively from several outcrops of the Fish Bed Formation.

The holotype is MAB 6000, a complete specimen in the collections of the Oertijdmuseum De Groene Poort. Other specimens are known, including the paratypes MAB 6001-6004. The holotype and paratypes were discovered with the aid of David John Cooper in the Central Lowlands, Scotland.

The species Ciderius cooperi was named by Gambit van der Brugghen in 2015. Several hundred specimens were described, although most are fragmentary.

== Description ==
The known remains of Ciderius suggest it grew up to at least 15 centimetres (5.9 in) long, and the specimens also preserved soft tissues.

The head of Ciderius was sectioned into three parts, and it likely possessed sclerotic rings. It also had a 'visceral cavity' similar to Euphanerops. The only parts of the animal that were not preserved in a lateral aspect were skin impressions, traces of fins and the head region.

== Classification ==
van der Brugghen (2015) classified Ciderius as the oldest known member of the Euphaneropidae, a family of jawless fishes.
