= Fish Bed Formation =

Geologic formation in Scotland

- Stratigraphic range: Wenlock; ~428–423 Ma
- Type: Formation
- Unit of: Glenbuck Group

Lithology
- Primary: Sandstone, conglomerate
- Other: Shale, siltstone

Location
- Coordinates: 55.5°N 3.9°W
- Approximate paleocoordinates: 17.9°S 18.3°W
- Region: South Lanarkshire
- Country: Scotland
- Fish Bed Formation (Scotland)

The Fish Bed Formation is a geological formation in Scotland, United Kingdom. The fluvial to lacustrine sandstones, shales, siltstones and conglomerates preserve flora, arthropods, among which eurypterids, invertebrates and early fish fossils dating back to the Wenlock epoch of the Silurian period.

== Description ==
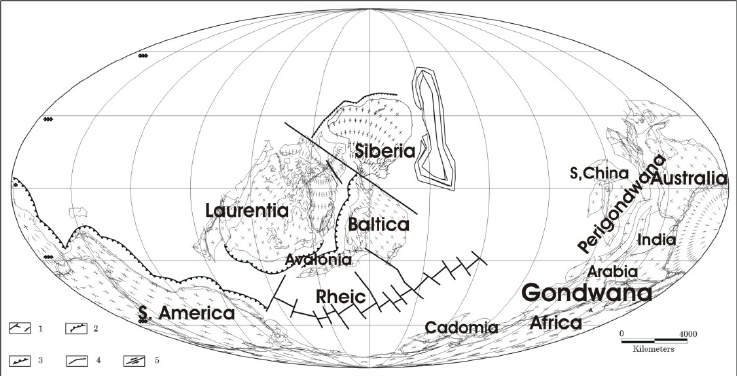
Paleogeography of the Early Silurian, 435 Ma

The fish beds are contained within red-bed sequences comprising conglomerates, sandstones and siltstones that exhibit sedimentological features suggestive of deposition in terrestrial–fluviatile and lacustrine environments (Bluck 2002). The sporomorph assemblage from the Fish Bed Formation indicates that it is entirely non-marine and was most likely deposited in a relatively permanent lacustrine setting (Wellman and Richardson 1993).

The formation, at the time part of Avalonia, was deposited during the Grampian orogeny.

== Fossil content ==
The Fish Bed Formation has provided fossils of:

=== Fish ===
- Birkenia sp.
- Lanarkia sp.
- Lasanius sp.

=== Arthropods ===
- Casiogrammus ichthyeros

==== Eurypterids ====
- Lanarkopterus dolichoschelus
- Parastylonurus ornatus
- Hughmilleria sp.

=== Invertebrates ===
Gastropods

- Ateleaspis sp.

=== Flora ===
- Plantae indet.

== See also ==
- List of fossiliferous stratigraphic units in Scotland
