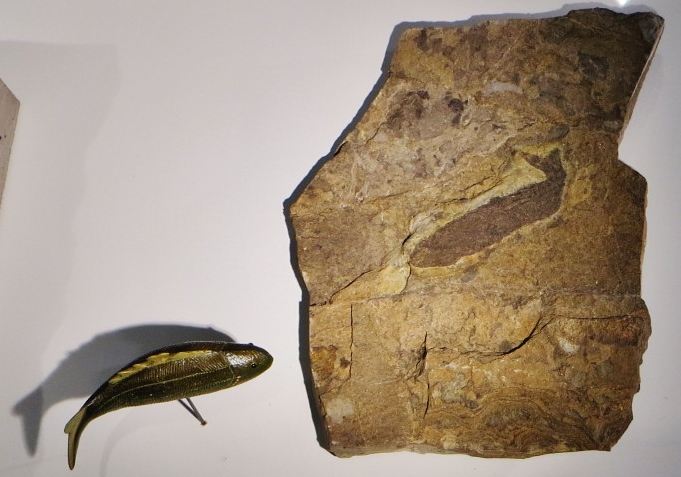
- Fossil and model of B. elegans

Scientific classification
- Kingdom: Animalia
- Phylum: Chordata
- Infraphylum: Agnatha
- Superclass: †Anaspidomorphi
- Class: †Anaspida
- Order: †Birkeniiformes
- Family: †Birkeniidae
- Genus: †Birkenia; Traquair 1898

Type species
- †Birkenia elegans Traquair, 1898

Species
- B. campbelli Traquair, 1898; B. elegans Traquair, 1898; B. robusta Blom, Märss and Miller, 2002

= Birkenia =

Birkenia Temporal range: Telychian–Lochkovian

Extinct genus of jawless fishes

Birkenia is a genus of extinct anaspid fish from Middle Silurian strata of Northern Europe, and Middle Silurian to possibly Earliest Devonian strata of Arctic Canada. Birkeniid anaspids are covered by a series of small plates on the head and rod-shaped scales in a cheveron-like pattern on the trunk.

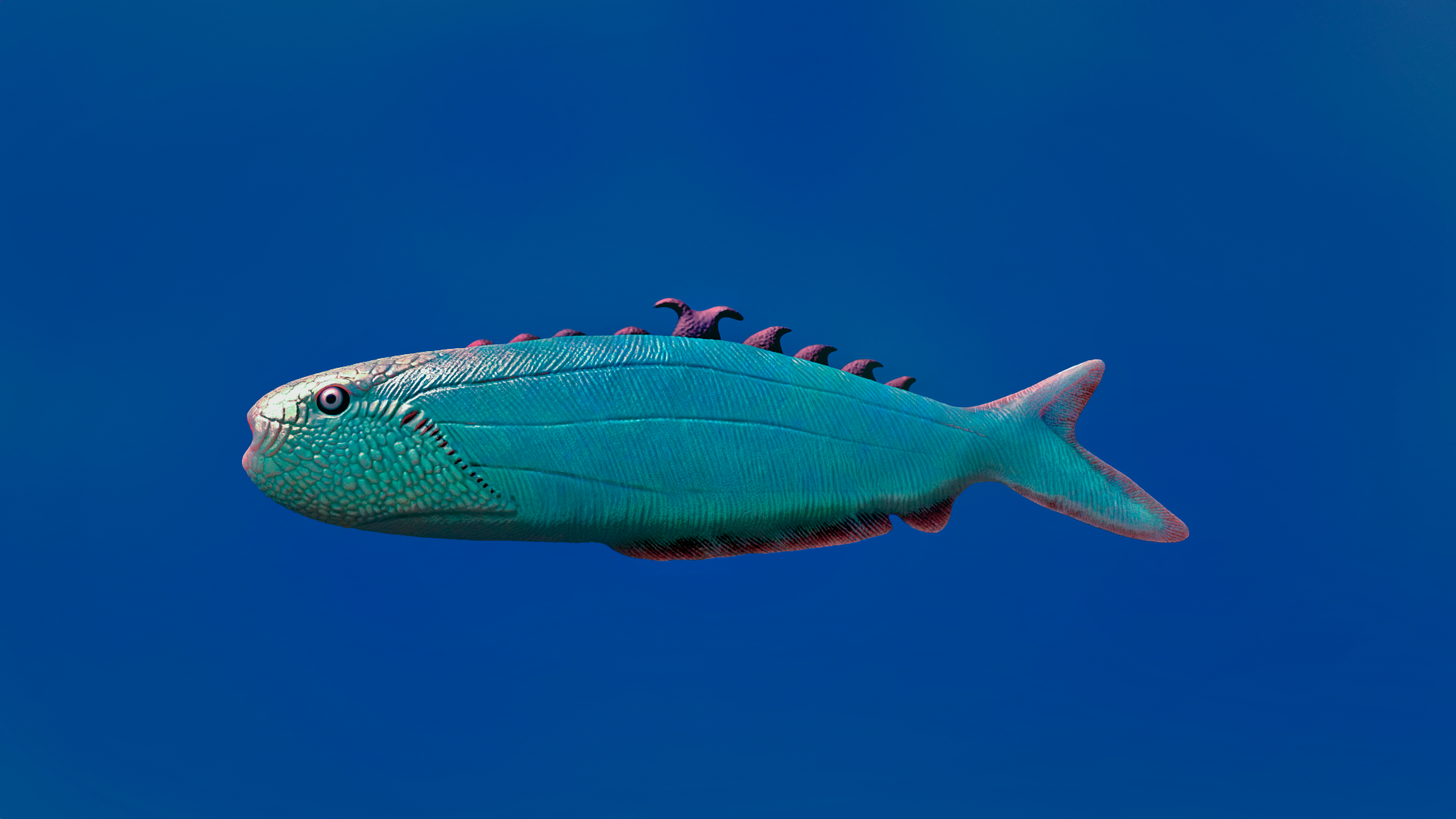
Life restoration

Intact fossil specimens of B. elegans suggest the living animal reached a length of up to 10.0 cm (3.9 in), and was an active swimmer. In addition to whole specimens and scale microfossils of B. elegans, which are found in Great Britain and Scandinavia, scales of a second species, B. robusta, are found in Late Silurian strata of Scandinavia and Estonia. The scales of B. robusta differ from those of B. elegans in that, as the specific epithet suggests, the scales of the former are more robustly proportioned than those of the latter. Fossil specimens also show a rib that is modified by being narrow at the ends and gradually broadens and rises towards the middle of the scale, where a major elevation is developed that is expressed as a raised and slightly angled ridge.
