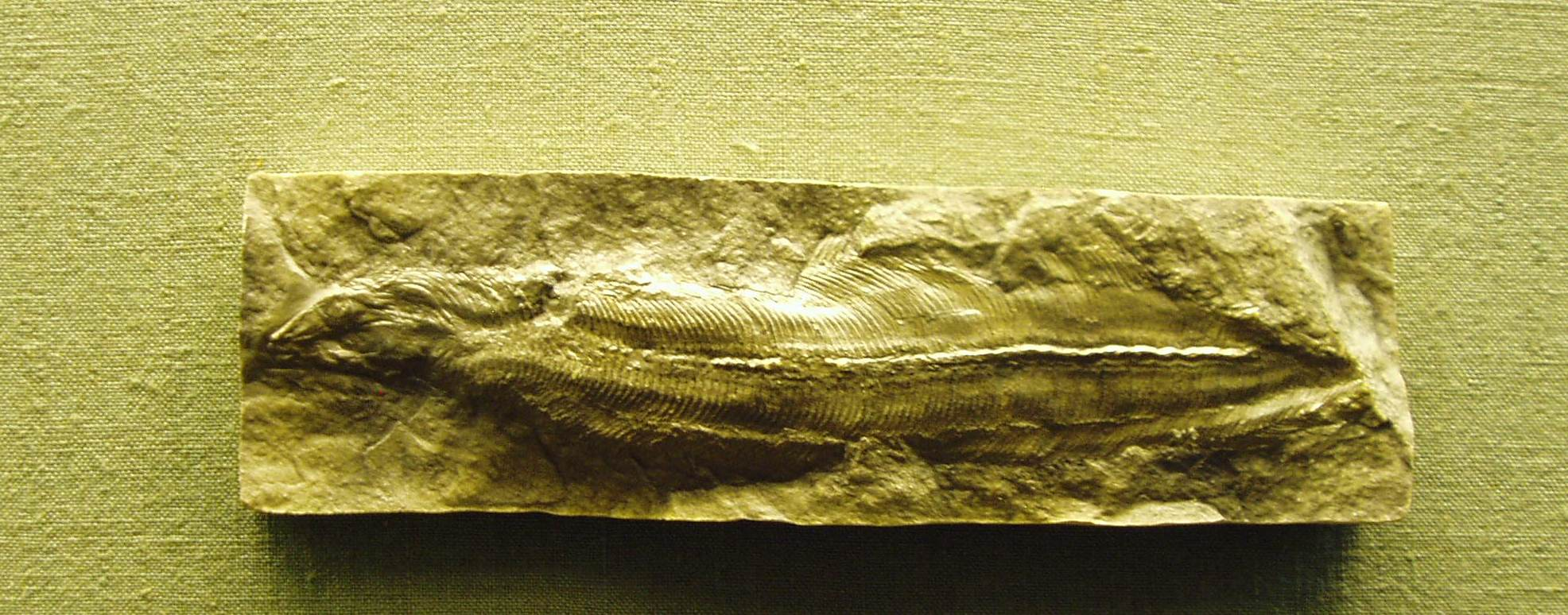

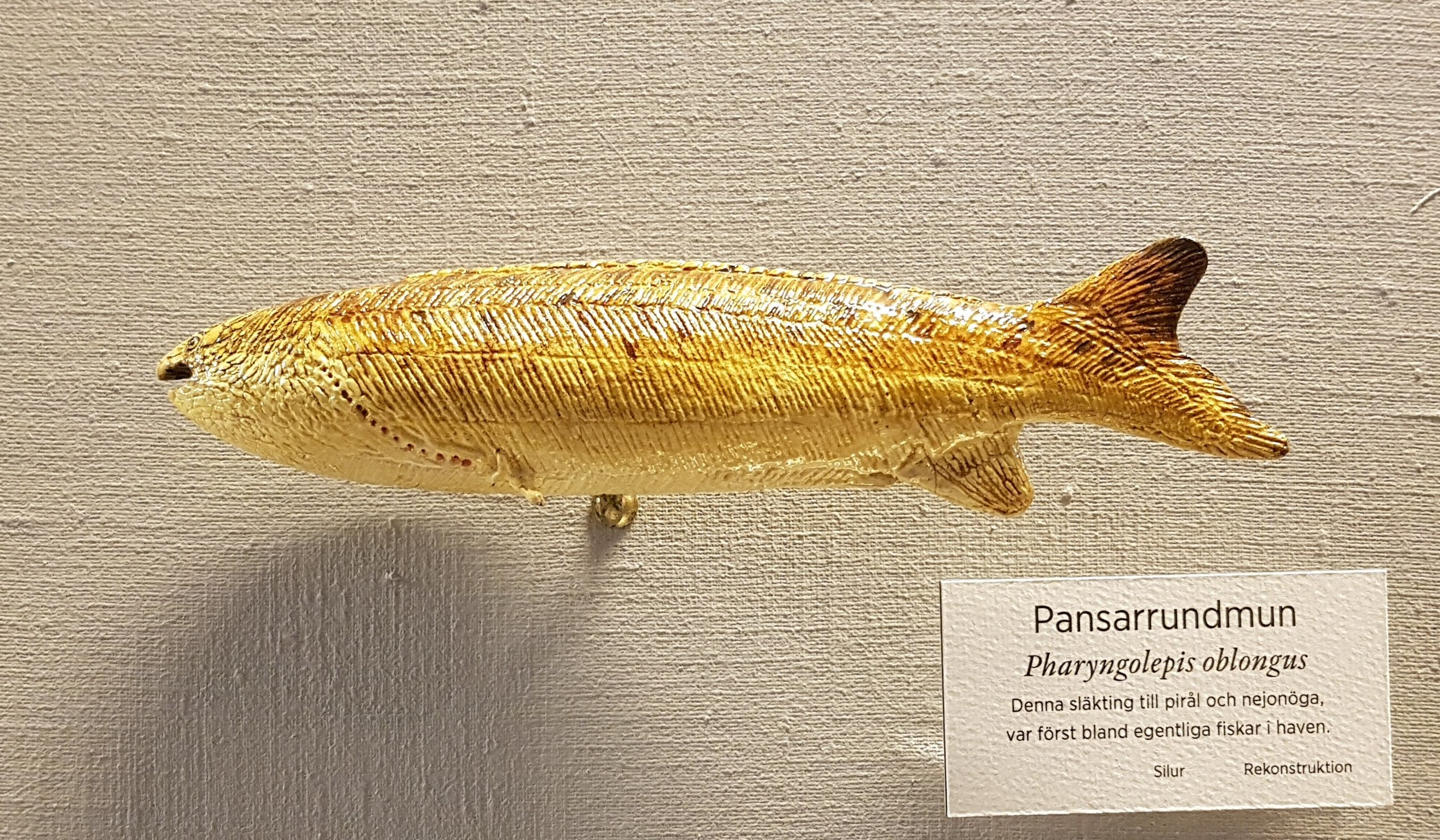

Scientific classification
- Kingdom: Animalia
- Phylum: Chordata
- Infraphylum: Agnatha
- Superclass: †Anaspidomorphi
- Class: †Anaspida
- Order: †Birkeniiformes
- Family: †Pharyngolepididae; Kiær 1924 corrig.
- Genus: †Pharyngolepis; Kiaer 1911

Type species
- Pharyngolepis oblonga Kiær 1911

Species
- P. heintzi Ritchie 1964; P. kiaeri Smith 1957; P. oblonga Kiar 1911

= Pharyngolepis =

Pharyngolepis Temporal range: Late Silurian

Extinct genus of jawless fishes

Pharyngolepis is an extinct genus of primitive jawless fish that lived in the Silurian period of what is now Norway.

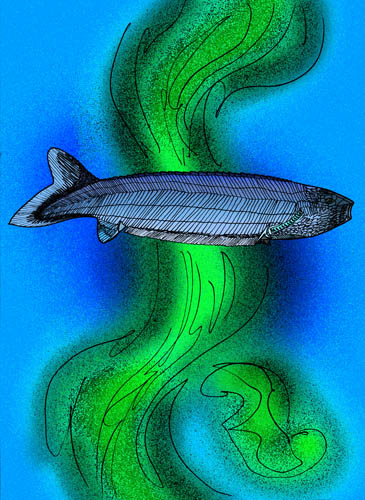
Life reconstruction

Pharyngolepis had well-developed anal and caudal fins, but no paired or dorsal fins that would have helped stabilise it in the water, and so was probably a poor swimmer, remaining close to the sea bottom. The pectoral fins were instead replaced by bony spines, possibly for protection against predators, and there was a row of spines along the back. It probably scooped up food from the ocean floor.
