= Liivilepis =

Scientific classification
- Kingdom: Animalia
- Phylum: Chordata
- Class: †Anaspida
- Order: †Birkeniiformes
- Family: †Septentrioniidae
- Genus: †Liivilepis Blom, Märss & Miller, 2002

Species
- †Liivilepis curvata Blom et al., 2002 (type)

Extinct genus of jawless fish

Liivilepis is an extinct genus of jawless fish belonging to the family Septentrioniidae.
