= Septentrionia =

Scientific classification
- Kingdom: Animalia
- Phylum: Chordata
- Infraphylum: Agnatha
- Superclass: †Anaspidomorphi
- Class: †Anaspida
- Order: †Birkeniiformes
- Family: †Septentrioniidae
- Genus: †Septentrionia; Blom, Märss & Miller, 2002

Type species
- Septentrionia lancifera Blom, Märss & Miller, 2002

Species
- †S. dissimilis Blom, Märss & Miller, 2002; †S. lancifera Blom, Märss & Miller, 2002; †S. mucronata Blom, Märss & Miller, 2002; †S. seducta Blom, Märss & Miller, 2002

Extinct genus of jawless fishes

Septentrionia is an extinct genus of jawless fish belonging to the family Septentrioniidae. It is the type genus of its family.
