= Ostracoderm =

Armored jawless fish of the Paleozoic

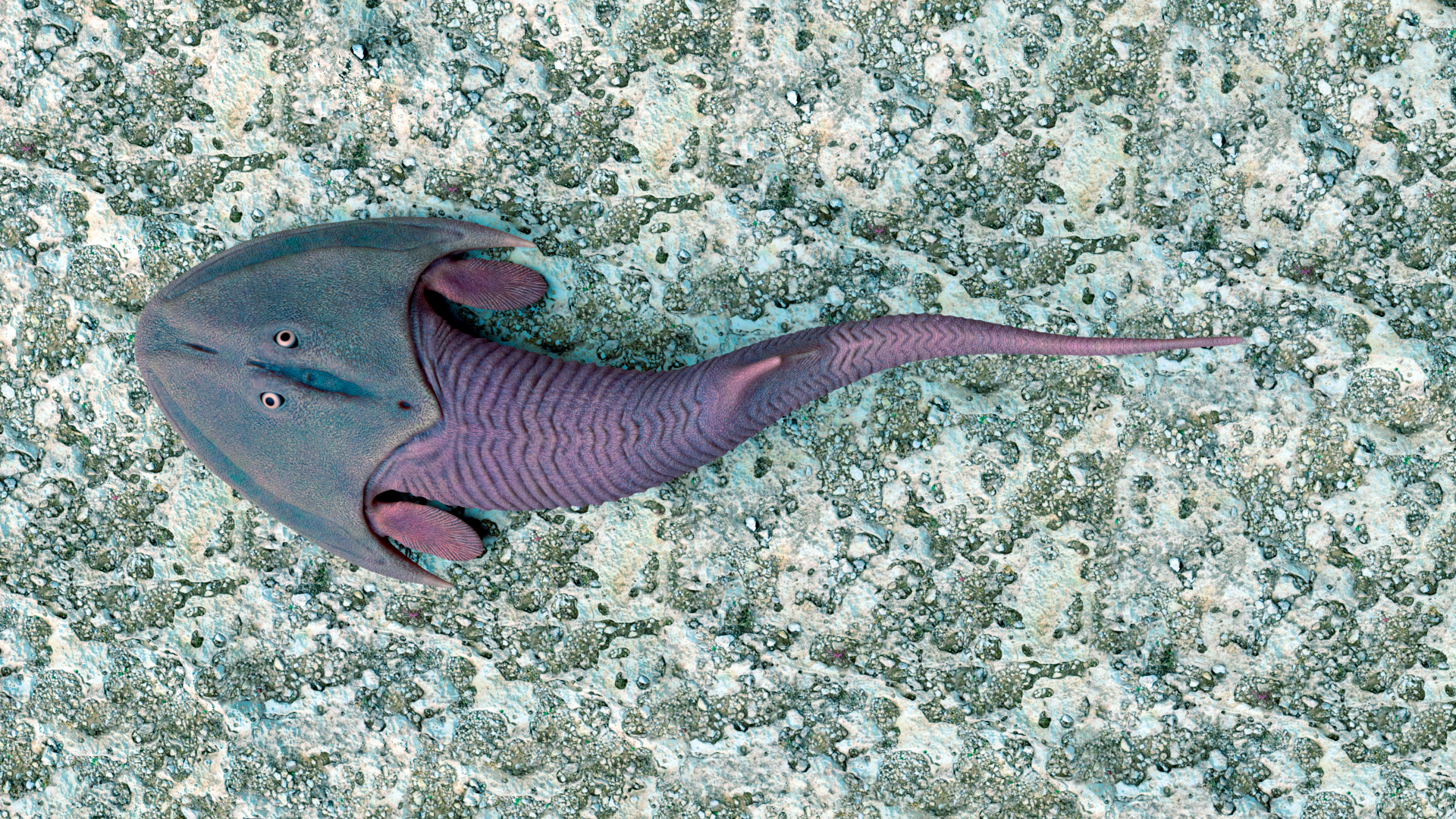
Reconstruction of Cephalaspis (Osteostraci)

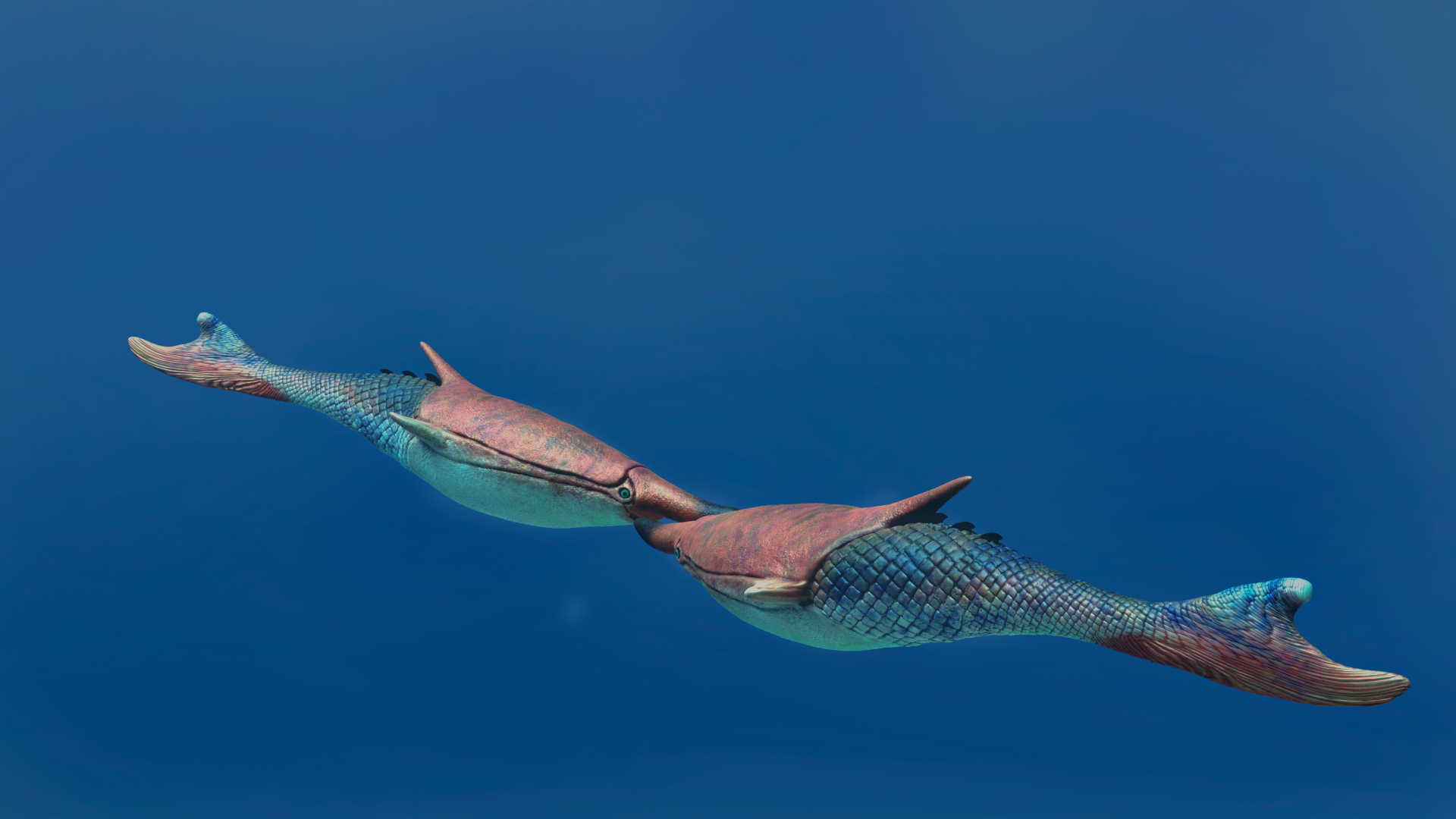
Life restoration of Pteraspis (Pteraspidomorpha)

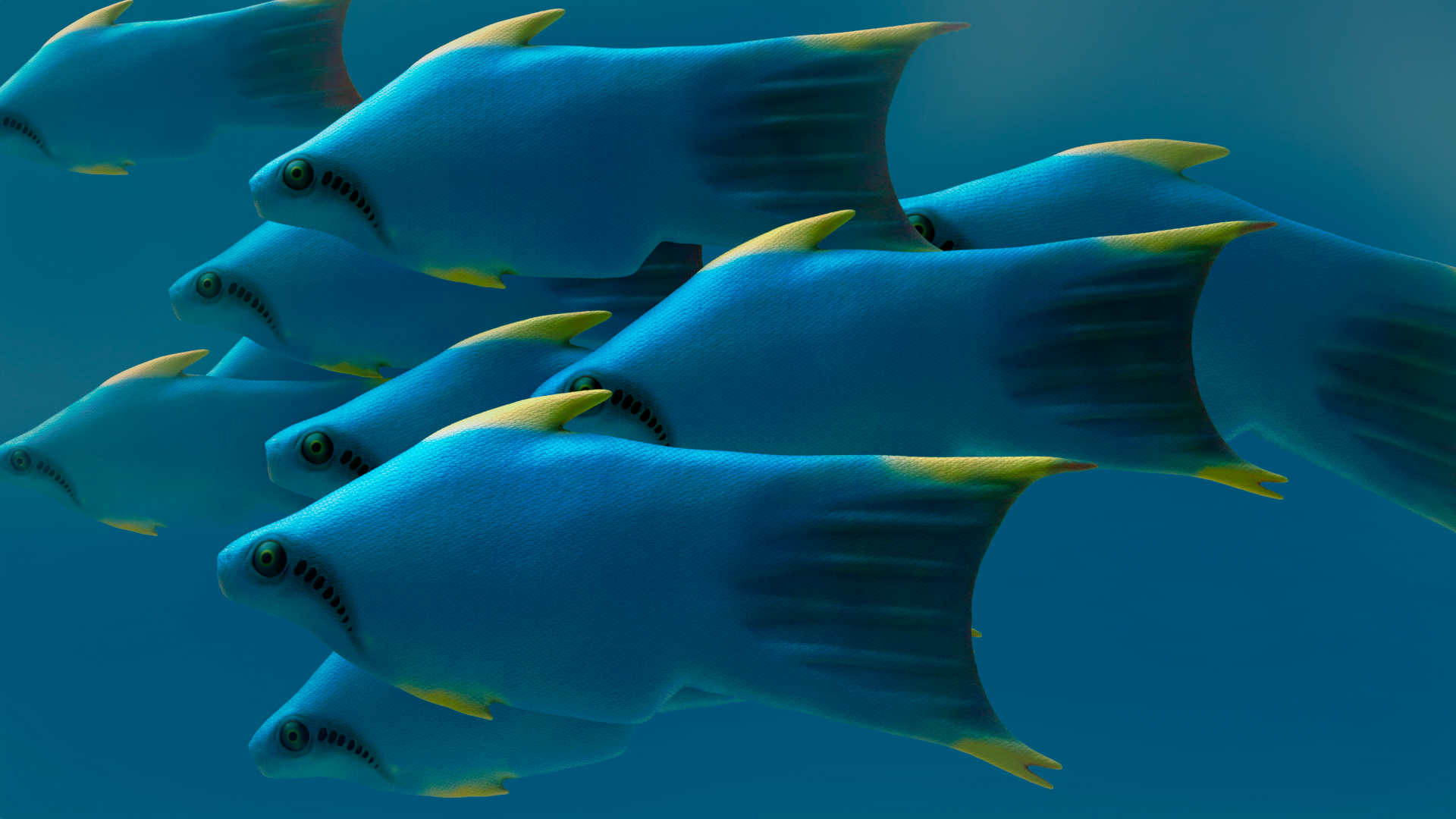
Restoration of a shoal of Furcacauda (Thelodonti)

Ostracodermi (lit. 'shell-skins') or ostracoderms is an informal group of vertebrate animals that include all armored jawless fish of the early Paleozoic era. The term does not often appear in taxonomic classifications today because it is paraphyletic excluding jawed fishes and possibly the cyclostomes (hagfish and lampreys) if they are more closely related to anaspids than other jawless fish). However, the term is still used informally as an umbrella term for all armored jawless fishes.

A physiological innovation of ostracoderms over the earlier myllokunmingiids and conodonts is the specialization of gills exclusively for respiration, instead of co-functioning as a filter feeding organ like the gill precursors of Cambrian chordates, who relies more on cutaneous respiration. Ostracoderms had separate pharyngeal gill pouches along the side of the head, which were permanently open with no protective gill covers. Unlike invertebrates that use cilial motion to trap and seize food, ostracoderms used their muscular pharynx to create a suction that pulled small planktons or food particles into their mouths.

Most ostracoderms are suggested to have been filter feeders, or deposit feeders.

Swiss anatomist Louis Agassiz received some fossils of bony armored fish from Scotland in the 1830s,. He had difficulty classifying them, as they did not resemble any living creature. He compared them at first with extant armored fish such as catfish and sturgeon, but later realized that they lacked movable jaws. He classified them in the newly named genus Cephalaspis. In a later 1844 study he recognised that their anatomy was fundamentally very different from sturgeons and catfish and that they were not closely related. In 1889, Edward Drinker Cope erected the grouping Ostracodermi to house them meaning 'shell-skinned' (from Greek ὄστρακον óstrakon + δέρμα dérma).

Ostracoderm headshields are partially composed of enameloid.

It was long assumed that pteraspidomorphs and thelodonts were the only ostracoderms with paired nostrils, while the other groups have just a single median nostril. It has since been revealed that even if galeaspidans have just one external opening, it has two internal nasal organs.

Following their first appearance in the Ordovician-Silurian, ostracoderms reached their apex of diversity during the Early Devonian, subsequently declining afterwards during the Middle and Late Devonian, with the last species becoming extinct in the end-Devonian mass extinction. The decline of the ostracoderms corresponds with the emergence and diversification of jawed vertebrates, though the idea that the decline of ostracoderms was driven by direct competition with jawed fish has been questioned.

The Subclass Ostracodermi has been placed in the division Agnatha along with the extant Subclass Cyclostomati, which includes lampreys and hagfishes.

== Major groups ==
Major groups of ostracoderms
Class	Image	Description
^{†}Galeaspida (extinct)		Galeaspida ('helmet-shields') have massive bone shield on the head. Galeaspida lived in shallow, fresh water and marine environments during the Silurian and Devonian times (430 to 370 million years ago) in what is now Southern China, Tibet and Vietnam. Superficially, their morphology appears more similar to that of Heterostraci than Osteostraci, and one species, Tujiaaspis vividus, had paired fins. Galeaspida are regarded as being more closely related to Osteostraci, based on the closer similarity of the morphology of the braincase.
^{†}Pituriaspida (extinct)		Pituriaspida ('pituri-shields') are a small group of extinct armoured jawless fishes with tremendous nose-like rostrums, which lived in the marine, deltaic environments of Middle Devonian Australia (about 390 Ma). They are known only by two species, Pituriaspis doylei and Neeyambaspis enigmatica found in a single sandstone location of the Georgina Basin, in Western Queensland, Australia.
^{†}Osteostraci (extinct)		Osteostraci ('bony-shells') lived in what is now North America, Europe and Russia from the Middle Silurian to Late Devonian. Anatomically speaking, the osteostracans, especially the Devonian species, were among the most advanced of all known agnathans. This is due to the development of paired fins, and their complicated cranial anatomy. The osteostracans were more similar to lampreys than to jawed vertebrates in possessing two pairs of semicircular canals in the inner ear, as opposed to the three pairs found in the inner ears of jawed vertebrates. They are thought to be the sister-group of pituriaspids. Together, these two taxa of jawless vertebrates are the sister-group of gnathostomes. Several synapomorphies support this hypothesis, such as the presence of: sclerotic ossicles, paired pectoral fins, a dermal skeleton with three layers (a basal layer of isopedin, a middle layer of spongy bone, and a superficial layer of dentin), and perichondral bone.
^{†}Pteraspido- morphi (extinct)		^{†}Pteraspidomorphi ('wing-shield forms') have extensive shielding of the head. Many had hypocercal tails in order to generate lift to increase ease of movement through the water for their armoured bodies, which were covered in dermal bone. They also had sucking mouth parts and some species may have lived in fresh water. The taxon contains the subgroups Heterostraci, Astraspida, Arandaspida.
^{†}Thelodonti (extinct)		Thelodonti ('feeble-teeth') are a group of small, extinct jawless fishes with distinctive scales instead of large plates of armour. There is much debate over whether the group of Palaeozoic fish known as the Thelodonti (formerly coelolepids) represent a monophyletic grouping, or disparate stem groups to the major lines of jawless and jawed fish. Thelodonts are united in possession of 'thelodont scales'. This defining character is not necessarily a result of shared ancestry, as it may have been evolved independently by different groups. Thus the thelodonts are generally thought to represent a polyphyletic group, although there is no firm agreement on this point; if they are monophyletic, there is no firm evidence on what their ancestral state was. Thelodonts were morphologically very similar, and probably closely related, to fish of the classes Heterostraci and Anaspida, differing mainly in their covering of distinctive, small, spiny scales. These scales were easily dispersed after death; their small size and resilience makes them the most common vertebrate fossil of their time. The fish lived in both freshwater and marine environments, first appearing during the Ordovician, and perishing during the Frasnian–Famennian extinction event of the Late Devonian. They were predominantly deposit-feeding bottom dwellers, although there is evidence to suggest that some species took to the water column to be free-swimming organisms.
^{†}Anaspida (extinct)		Anaspida ('no-shields') is an extinct group of primitive jawless vertebrates that lived during the Silurian and Devonian periods. Anaspids were small marine agnathans that lacked heavy bony shield and paired fins, but have a striking highly hypocercal tail. They first appeared in the Early Silurian, and flourished until the Late Devonian extinction, where most species, save for lampreys, became extinct due to the environmental upheaval during that time.

== Phylogeny ==
Phylogeny of "ostracoderm" groups and other jawless fish after Reeves and colleagues (2023)

- Vertebrata total group
  - †Haikouella
  - - †Metaspriggina
    - †Myllokunmingiida
    - Vertebrata crown group
      - Cyclostomi total group
        - †Anaspida
          - †Birkeniida
          - - †Lasanius
            - - †Jamoytius
              - †Euphanerops
        - - †Euconodonta
          - Cyclostomi crown group
            - Myxinoidea
            - Petromyzontida
      - Gnathostomata total group
        - †Pteraspidomorphi
          - †Astraspis
          - - †Arandaspida
            - †Heterostraci
        - - †Thelodonti
            - †Furcacaudiformes
            - †Thelodontiformes
          - - †Pituriaspida
            - - †Galeaspida
              - - †Osteostraci
                - Gnathostomata (traditional usage)
                  - †Antiarchi
                  - - †Arthrodira
                    - Gnathostomata crown group
                      - Osteichthyes
                      - Chondrichthyes

== See also ==
- Acanthodii
- Placoderm
