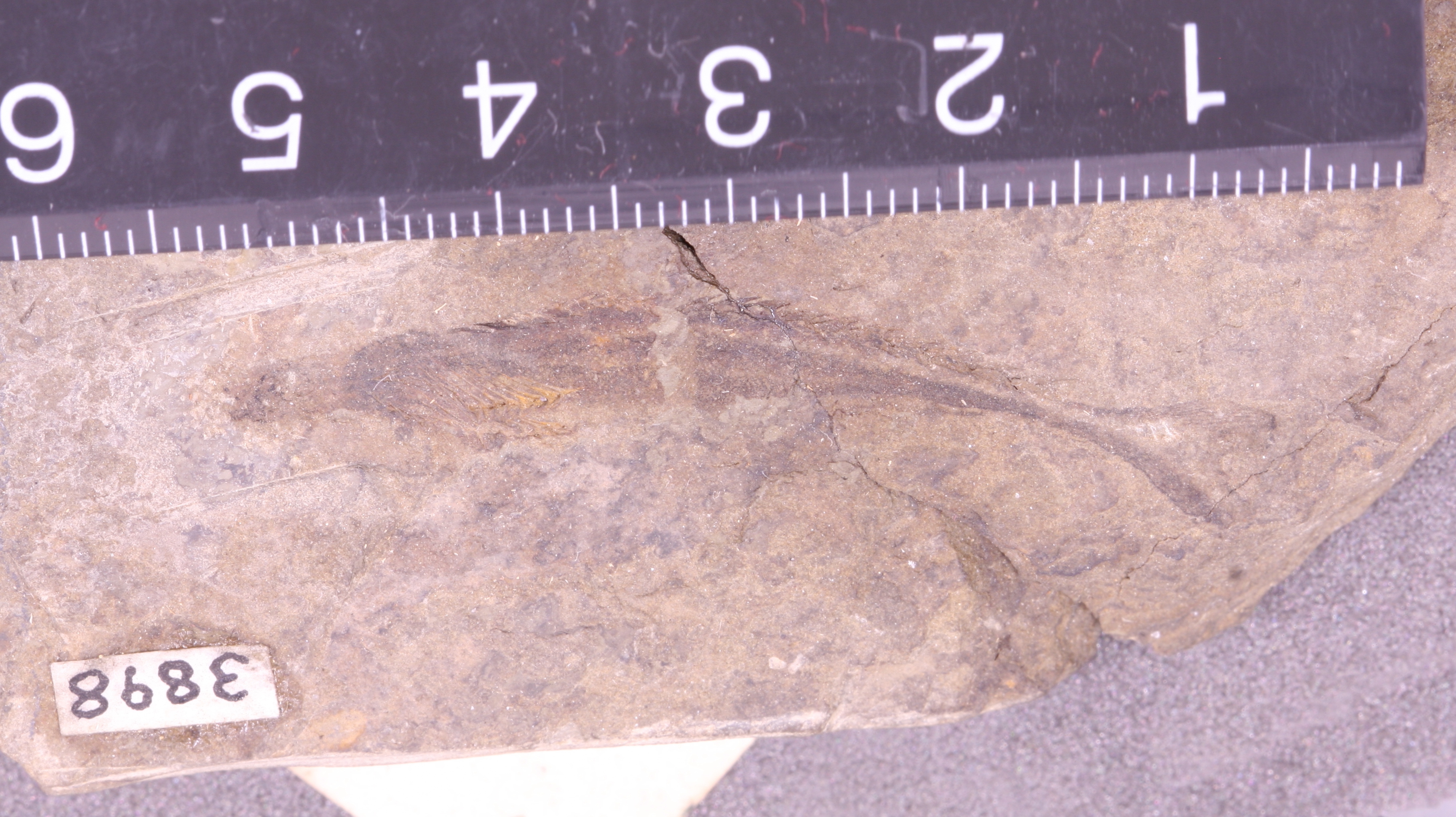
- Lasanius problematicus
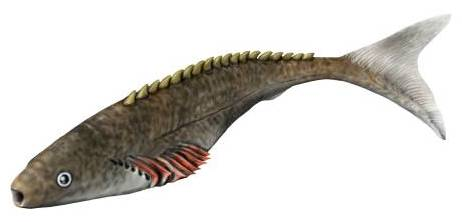
- Life reconstruction of Lasanius problematicus

Scientific classification
- Kingdom: Animalia
- Phylum: Chordata
- Class: ?†Anaspida
- Family: †Lasaniidae
- Genus: †Lasanius Traquair 1898

Type species
- †Lasanius problematicus Traquair 1898

Species
- L. altus Smith 1958; L. armatus Traquair 1899; L. problematicus Traquair 1898

= Lasanius =

Lasanius Temporal range: Early Silurian 443.8 Ma

Genus of jawless fishes

Lasanius is a genus of basal anaspid from the Early Silurian, around 443.8 million years ago, known from fossils found near Lesmahagow, Scotland. Specimens range from 13.3 to 74.5 mm in length.

Lasanius has a pair of eyes, and a notochord, and while it has rows of bony scutes running along its back, it lacks the armour typical of other Paleozoic jawless fish like ostracoderms. There are also structures close to the front of the animal dubbed "chains" and "rods", of unclear function. At the end of the body a hypocercal tail fin was present in the form of a caudal lobe. Historically, it has often been allied with the anaspids, though other studies found it to be unrelated. A comprehensive redescription published in 2023 found that it was an anaspid and a stem-group cyclostome, more closely related to hagfish and lampreys than to jawed fish.

- Vertebrata total group
  - †Haikouella
  - - †Metaspriggina
    - †Myllokunmingiida
    - Vertebrata crown group
      - Cyclostomi total group
        - †Anaspida
          - †Birkeniida
          - - †Lasanius
            - - †Jamoytius
              - †Euphanerops
        - - †Euconodonta
          - Cyclostomi crown group
            - Myxinoidea
            - Petromyzontida
      - Gnathostomata total group
        - †Pteraspidomorphi
          - †Astraspis
          - - †Arandaspida
            - †Heterostraci
        - - †Thelodonti
            - †Furcacaudiformes
            - †Thelodontiformes
          - - †Pituriaspida
            - - †Galeaspida
              - - †Osteostraci
                - Gnathostomata (traditional usage)
                  - †Antiarchi
                  - - †Arthrodira
                    - Gnathostomata crown group
                      - Osteichthyes
                      - Chondrichthyes
