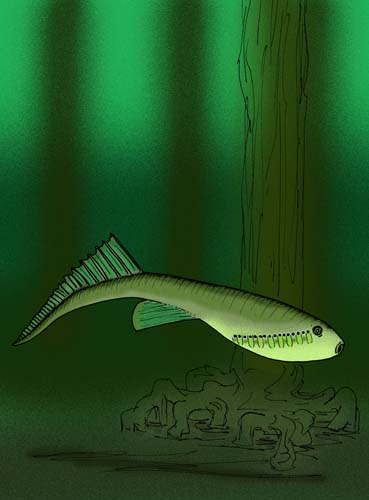
- Reconstruction of the late Devonian jamoytiiform agnathan, Cornovichthys blaauweni, of Scotland

Scientific classification
- Kingdom: Animalia
- Phylum: Chordata
- Superclass: †Anaspidomorphi
- Order: †Euphanerida
- Family: †Euphaneropidae
- Genus: †Cornovichthys Newman & Trewin, 2001

Species
- †Cornovichthys blaauweni

= Cornovichthys =

Cornovichthys Temporal range: Devonian

Extinct genus of jawless fishes

Cornovichthys is an extinct genus of jawless fish in the super class Anaspidomorphi. It is known from the Middle Devonian of Scotland.

Cornovichthys is also classified as a rare agnathan and shares similarities with the fauna found in the Late Devonian Escuminac Formation of Canada. The passage also states that while Cornovichthys may have been widespread in the Silurian and Devonian periods, it is only found when preserved under exceptional circumstances.
