= Euphaneropidae =

Euphaneropidae Temporal range: Lower Silurian–Upper Devonian
- Ciderius cooperi

Scientific classification
- Kingdom: Animalia
- Phylum: Chordata
- Superclass: †Anaspidomorphi
- Order: †Jamoytiiformes
- Family: †Euphaneropidae Woodward 1900

Type genus
- †Euphanerops Woodward, 1900

Genera
- †Achanarella; †Ciderius; †Cornovichthys; †Euphanerops (=Endeiolepis, Legendrelepis)

Synonyms
- †Euphaneropsidae (sic) Woodward, 1900; †Endeiolepidae Stensiö, 1939; †Lasaniidae Goodrich, 1909

Extinct family of jawless fishes

Euphaneropidae is an extinct family of prehistoric jawless fishes in the extinct order Euphanerida. These fishes are characterised by a greatly elongated branchial apparatus which covers most of the length of the body. Fossils are known from the Lower Silurian and Middle Devonian of Scotland, and the Upper Devonian of Canada. In particular, Euphanerops is unique in that it has two anal fins.
