= Subphylum =

Taxonomic rank

The hierarchy of biological classification's eight major taxonomic ranks. Intermediate minor rankings are not shown.

In zoological nomenclature, a subphylum is a taxonomic rank below the rank of phylum.

The taxonomic rank of "subdivision" in fungi and plant taxonomy is equivalent to "subphylum" in zoological taxonomy. Some plant taxonomists have also used the rank of subphylum, for instance monocotyledons as a subphylum of phylum Angiospermae and vertebrates as a subphylum of phylum Chordata.

== Taxonomic rank ==
Subphylum is:

1. subordinate to the phylum
2. superordinate to the infraphylum, which is in turn superordinate to parvphylum.

Where convenient, subphyla in turn can be divided into infraphyla; in turn such an infraphylum also would be superordinate to any classes or superclasses in the hierarchy.

== Examples ==
Not all fauna phyla are divided into subphyla. Those that are include:

- Arthropoda: divided into subphyla Trilobitomorpha, Chelicerata, Myriapoda, and Crustacea
- Brachiopoda: divided into subphyla Linguliformea, Craniformea and Rhynchonelliformea
- Chordata: divided into Tunicata, Cephalochordata, and its largest subphylum Vertebrata

Examples of infraphyla include the Mycetozoa, the Gnathostomata and the Agnatha.

== Bibliography ==
- Hutchinson, John (1973). The families of flowering plants, arranged according to a new system based on their probable phylogeny. 2 vols (3rd ed.). Oxford University Press.
