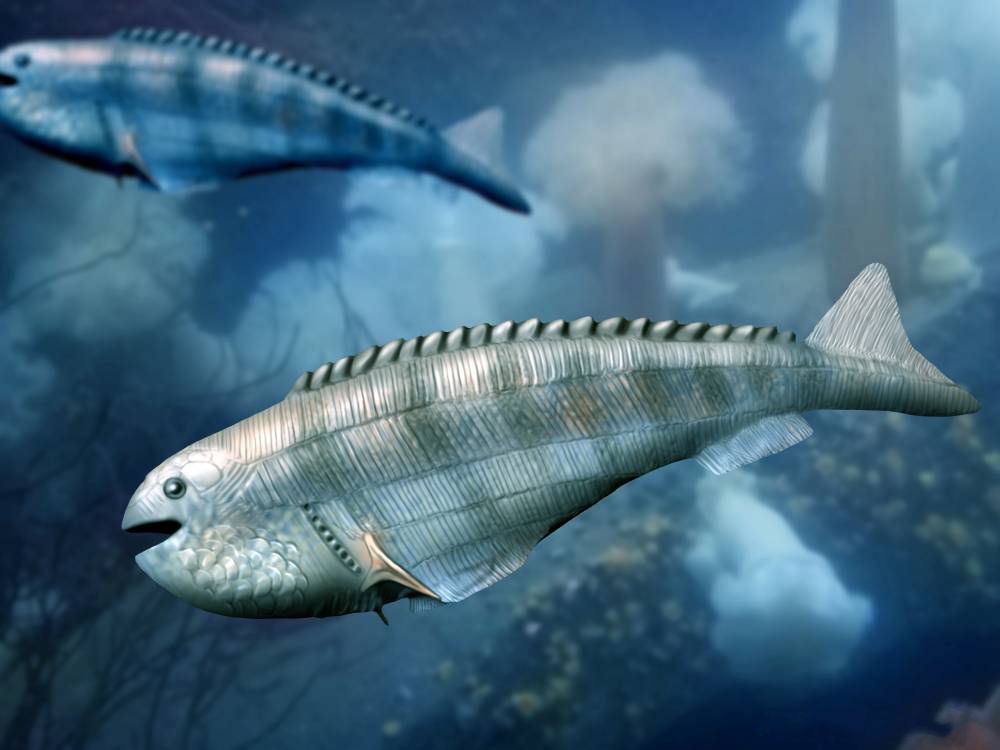
- Reconstruction C. ritchiei

Scientific classification
- Kingdom: Animalia
- Phylum: Chordata
- Class: †Anaspida
- Order: †Birkeniiformes
- Genus: †Cowielepis Blom, 2008

Species
- †Cowielepis ritchiei

= Cowielepis =

Cowielepis Temporal range: Wenlock/Lochkovian

Extinct genus of jawless fishes

Cowielepis is an extinct genus of jawless fish in the class Anaspida. It is from the Cowie Harbour fish bed (Cowie Formation) of Stonehaven, Scotland, which age is considered as the Silurian (Wenlock to Ludlow), or Early Devonian (Lochkovian).

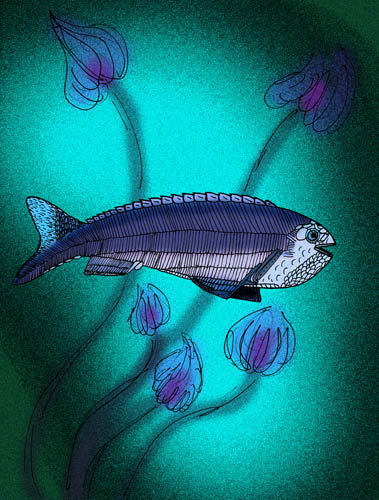
Restoration of Cowielepis ritchiei

== Habits ==
It was possibly a nectonic filter, of active locomotion, due to its physiognomy.

== Distribution ==
Lochkovian of United Kingdom (Scotland).
