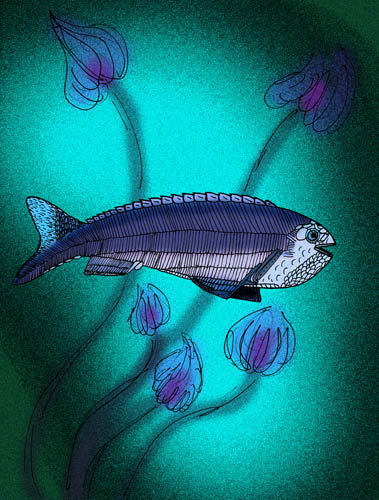
- Reconstruction of the Late Silurian anaspid agnathan Cowielepis ritchiei, of Cowie Bay, Scotland

Scientific classification
- Kingdom: Animalia
- Phylum: Chordata
- Infraphylum: Agnatha
- Superclass: †Anaspidomorphi

Subtaxa
- †Euphanerida; †Jamoytiiformes; †Anaspida

= Anaspidomorphi =

Anaspidomorphs Temporal range: 444–358.9 Ma Early Silurian - Late Devonian

Extinct superclass of jawless fishes

Anaspidomorphi (anaspidomorphs) is an extinct superclass of jawless fish.

According to the newer taxonomy based on the work of Nelson, Grande and Wilson 2016 and van der Laan 2018, the phylogeny of Anaspidomorphi looks like this:

- Superclass †Anaspidomorphi
  - Order †Euphanerida
    - Family †Euphaneropidae Woodward, 1900
  - Order †Jamoytiiformes Halstead-Tarlo, 1967
    - Family †Achanarellidae Newman, 2002
    - Family †Jamoytiidae White, 1946
  - Class †Anaspida Janvier, 1996 non Williston, 1917
    - Order †Endeiolepidiformes Berg, 1940
      - Family †Endeiolepididae Stensio, 1939
    - Order †Birkeniiformes Stensiö, 1964
      - Family †Pharyngolepididae Kiær, 1924
      - Family †Pterygolepididae Obručhev, 1964
      - Family †Rhyncholepididae Kiær, 1924
      - Family †Tahulalepididae Blom, Märss & Miller, 2002
      - Family †Lasaniidae Goodrich, 1909
      - Family †Ramsaasalepididae Blom, Märss & Miller, 2003
      - Family †Birkeniidae Traquair, 1899
      - Family †Septentrioniidae Blom, Märss & Miller, 2002
