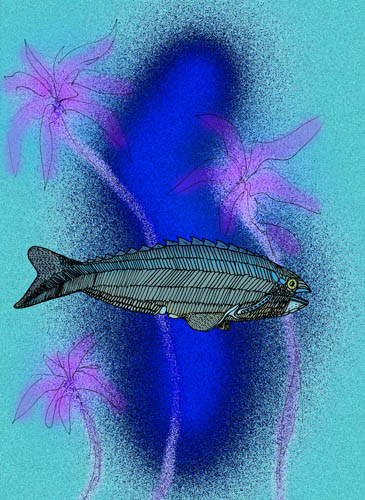

Scientific classification
- Domain: Eukaryota
- Kingdom: Animalia
- Phylum: Chordata
- Infraphylum: Agnatha
- Class: †Anaspida
- Order: †Birkeniiformes
- Family: †Rhyncholepididae; Kiær 1924 corrig.
- Genus: †Rhyncholepis; Kiær 1911 non Miquel 1843 non Nuttall 1841

Type species
- Rhyncholepis parvula Kiær 1911

Species
- R. butriangula Blom, Märss & Miller 2002; R. parvula Kiær 1911

= Rhyncholepis =

Rhyncholepis Temporal range: Silurian

Extinct genus of jawless fishes

Rhyncholepis was an extinct genus of anaspid from the Late Silurian. Fossils of species R. butriangula and R. parvula have been found in Ringerike, Norway, and Oesel, Estonia. The genus has two species, described in 1911 and 2002.

== Discovery ==
Rhyncholepis parvula was discovered and originally described in 1911, and described in more detail in 1924 by Norwegian Professor Johan Kiær. In the associated monograph, Kiær describes the genus in great detail, along with several other anaspids discovered around the same time.

More recently, the second discovered species (R. butriangula) was described by Henning Blom, Tiiu Märss, and C. Giles Miller in 2002.
