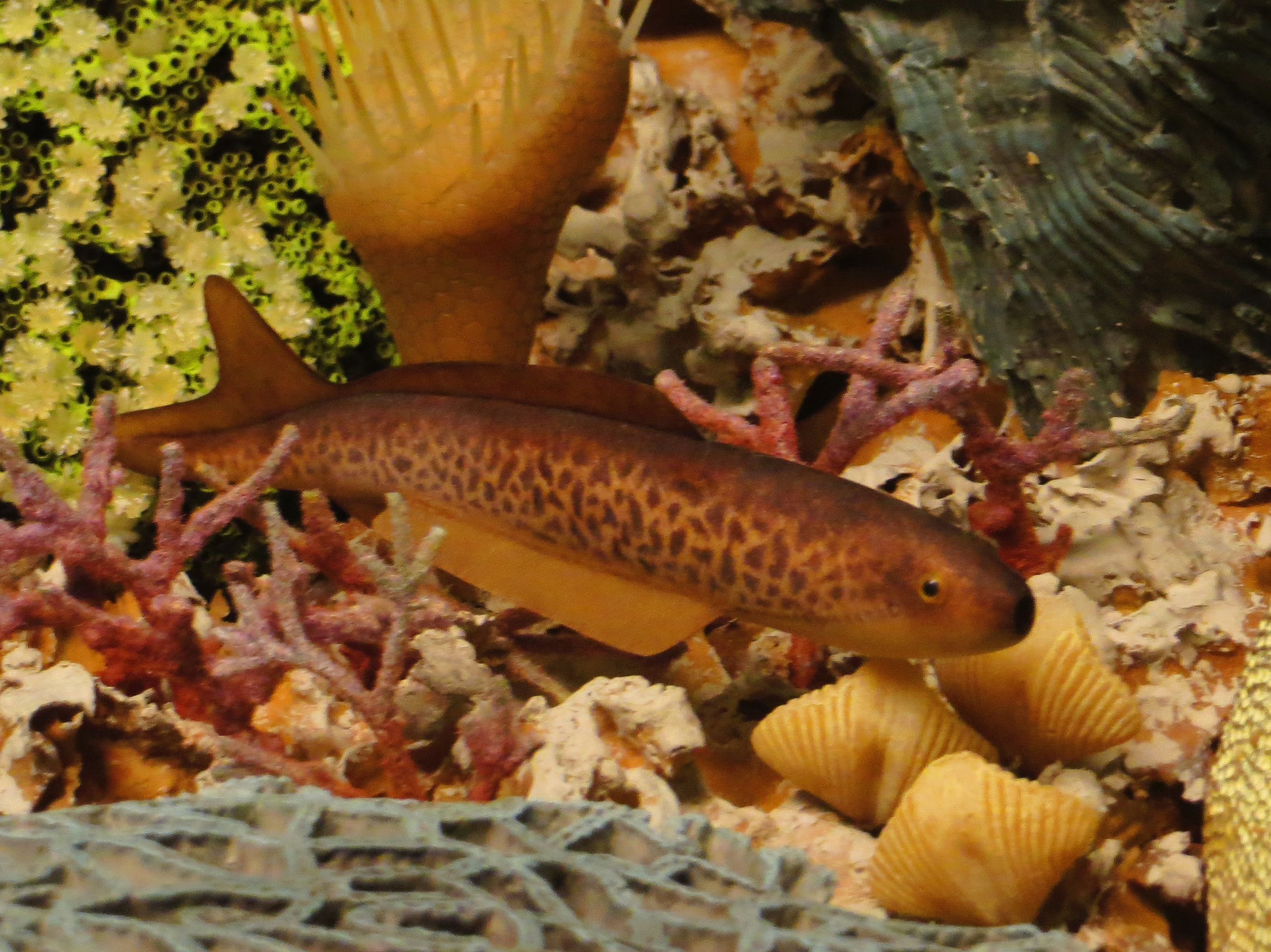
- Model of Jaymoytius kerwoodi at the Museum Mensch und Natur

Scientific classification
- Kingdom: Animalia
- Phylum: Chordata
- Infraphylum: Agnatha
- Superclass: †Anaspidomorphi
- Order: †Jamoytiiformes
- Family: †Jamoytiidae
- Genus: †Jamoytius
- Species: †J. kerwoodi

Binomial name
- †Jamoytius kerwoodi White, 1946

= Jamoytius =

Jamoytius Temporal range: Llandovery Epoch to Wenlock Epoch, 443.8–427.4 Ma

Extinct genus of jawless vertebrates

Jamoytius kerwoodi is an extinct species of primitive, eel-like jawless fish known from the Patrick Burn Formation in Scotland, dating to the Llandovery epoch of the Early Silurian period.

Long thought of as a "basal anaspid," J. kerwoodi is now recognized as the best-known member of the Hyperoartian order Jamoytiiformes. It had an elongated body, and is thought to have had, in comparison with relatives known from intact bodies like Euphanerops, a dorsal fin and an anal fin near the rearmost third of its body. Earlier reconstructions depict the creature as having side-fins running the length of its body, starting from behind the branchial openings to the tip of its tail: new research demonstrates that such "fins" are actually deformations of the bodywall as the corpse was being squished post-burial. In life, J. kerwoodi resembled a lamprey with a very small mouth. Because the fossil had no teeth, teeth-like structures, nor suggestions of either in its mouth, it was not carnivorous like many modern lampreys. It was more likely to have been a filter-feeder or a detritus-feeder, possibly in the manner of larval lampreys.

The fish had a cartilaginous skeleton, and a branchial basket resembling the cyclostomes - features that suggest that it was a basal member of that clade. It is also the earliest known vertebrate with camera-type eyes. It also possessed weakly mineralised scales.

== History of research ==
Jamoytius was originally named by Errol White on the basis of two specimens (the generic name is a reference to J. A. Moy-Thomas) and, at the time, it was considered to be the most basal vertebrate known. Since then, it has been reclassified by many workers as having many different affinities, such as an "unspecialized anaspid", or as a sister taxon to the lampreys, its difficulty in classification due to difficulties in reconstructing the anatomy; it does not possess any usual chordate synapomorphies. Currently, J. kerwoodi is now placed in its own order Jamoytiiformes, together with Euphanerops and similar agnathans.

== Palaeoecology ==
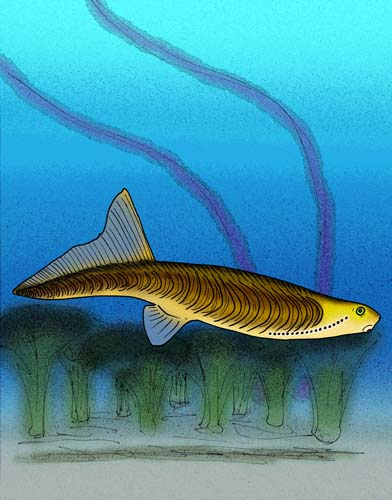
Life restoration

J. kerwoodi is believed to have been a surface-feeding detritivore or herbivore, with evidence that it grazed on Dictyocaris.
