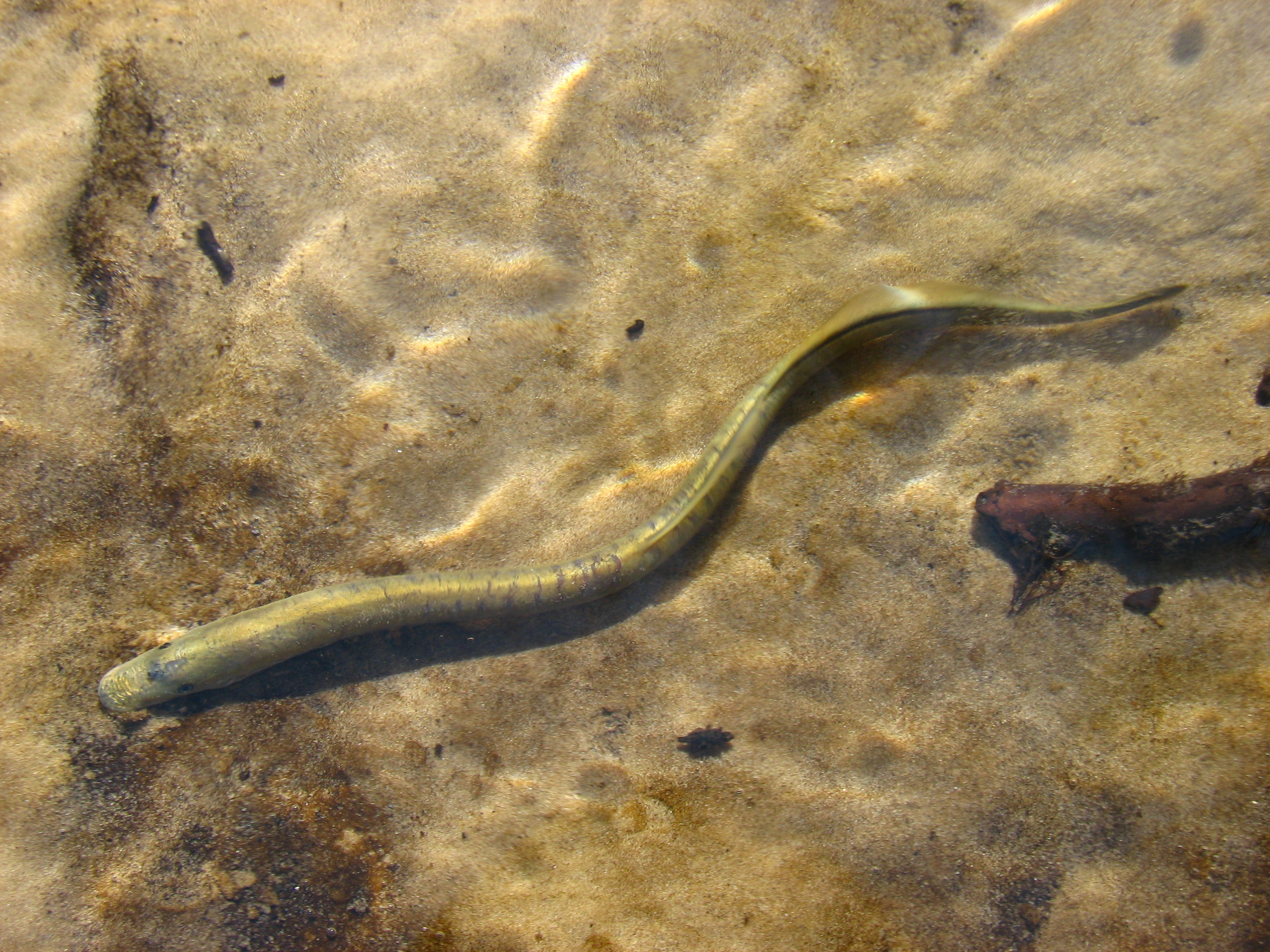
- A lamprey, a jawless fish belonging to Cyclostomi
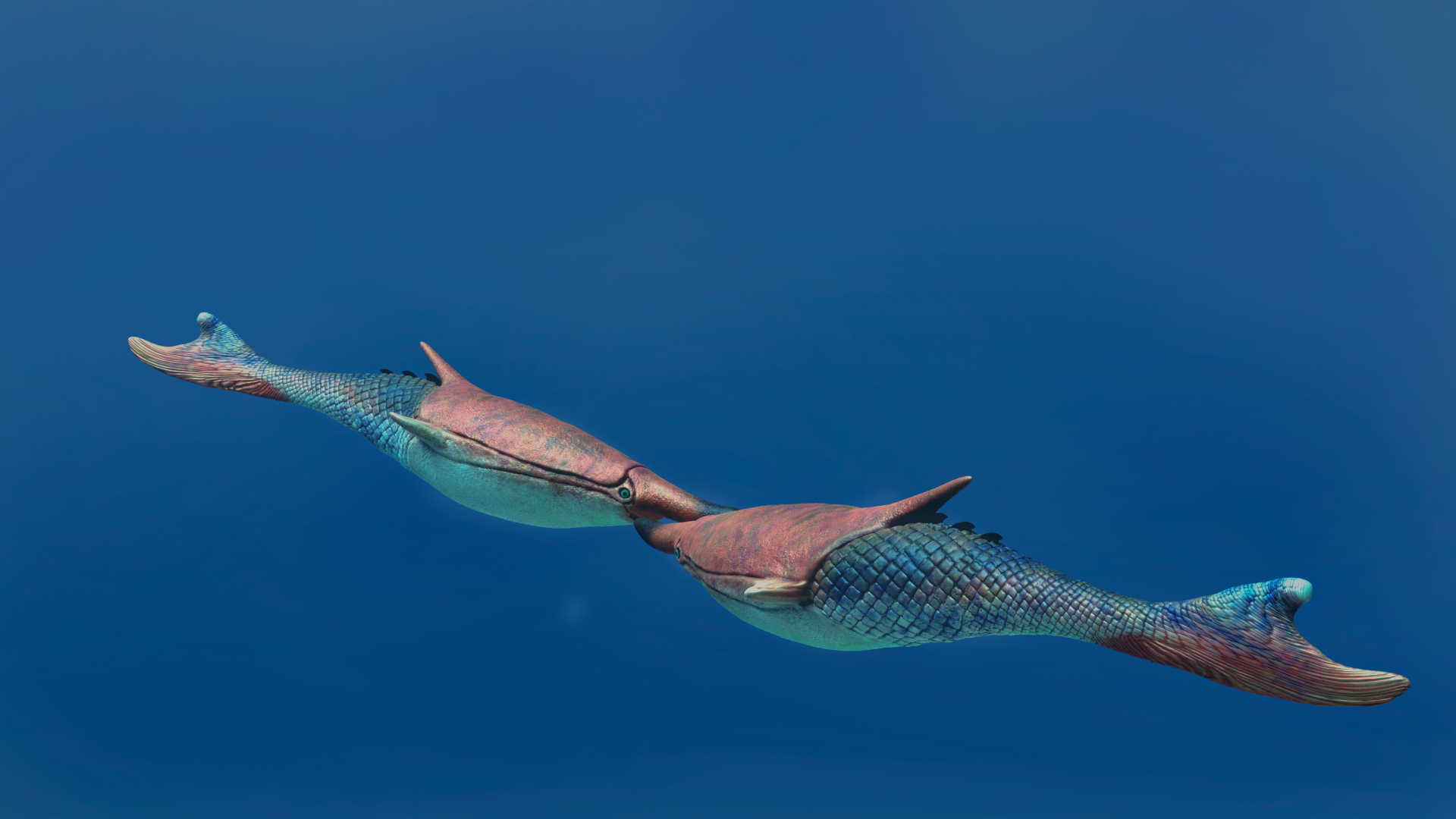
- Life reconstruction of extinct agnathan genus, Pteraspis (Pteraspidomorphi)

Scientific classification
- Kingdom: Animalia
- Phylum: Chordata
- Subphylum: Vertebrata
- Infraphylum: Agnatha; Cope, 1889

Groups included
- †Anaspidomorphi; †Conodonta; Cyclostomi (hagfish and lampreys); †Galeaspida; †Myllokunmingiida?; †Metaspriggina?; †Nuucichthys?; †Osteostraci; †Pituriaspida; †Pteraspidomorpha; †Thelodonti; †Yunnanozoonidae?; †Zhongxiniscus?; †Emmonaspis?

Excluded (but included in the lineage)
- Gnathostomata

= Agnatha =

Jawless fish Temporal range: Cambrian Stage 3–Present 518 –0 Ma

Paraphyletic infraphylum of fish

Agnatha (/ˈæɡnəθə, æɡˈneɪθə/; from Ancient Greek ἀ- (a-) 'without' and γνάθος (gnáthos) 'jaws') or jawless fish is a paraphyletic infraphylum of animals in the subphylum Vertebrata of the phylum Chordata, characterized by the lack of jaws. The group consists of both living (cyclostomes such as hagfishes and lampreys) and extinct clades (e.g. conodonts and the various armoured "ostracoderm" groups). They are sister to vertebrates with jaws known as gnathostomes, who evolved from jawless ancestors during the early Silurian by developing folding articulations in the first pairs of gill arches.

Molecular data, both from rRNA and from mtDNA as well as embryological data, strongly supports the hypothesis that both groups of living agnathans, hagfishes and lampreys, are more closely related to each other than to jawed fish, forming the superclass Cyclostomi.

The oldest fossil agnathans appeared in the Cambrian, with jawless fish, particularly "ostracoderms" reaching an apex of diversity during the Early Devonian, though they subsequently declined, with all non-cyclostome jawless fish other than conodonts having become extinct by the end of the Devonian. Living jawless fish comprise about 120 species in total. Hagfish are considered members of the subphylum Vertebrata, because they secondarily lost vertebrae; before this event was inferred from molecular and developmental data, the Craniata hypothesis was accepted (and is still sometimes used as a strictly morphological descriptor) to reference hagfish plus vertebrates.

== Metabolism ==
Agnathans are ectothermic, meaning they do not regulate their own body temperature. They have no distinct stomach, but rather a long gut, more or less homogeneous throughout its length. Lampreys feed on carrion, as well as other fish and marine mammals, although some species are non-carnivorous. Anticoagulant fluids preventing blood clotting are injected into the host, causing the host to yield more blood. Hagfish are scavengers, eating mostly dead animals, although they have also been observed hunting. They use a row of sharp teeth to break down the animal. Because agnathan teeth are unable to move up and down, their possible food types are limited. Hagfish have been observed to have a prodigious appetite and can consume up to 20% of their own body weight in a single meal.

== Morphology ==
In addition to the absence of jaws, modern agnathans are characterised by absence of paired fins; the presence of a notochord both in larvae and adults; and seven or more paired gill pouches. Lampreys have a light-sensitive pineal eye (homologous to the pineal gland in mammals). All living and most extinct Agnatha do not have an identifiable stomach or paired appendages. Fertilization and development are both external. There is no parental care in the Agnatha class. The Agnatha are ectothermic or cold-blooded, with a cartilaginous skeleton, and the heart contains 2 chambers.

=== Body covering ===
In modern agnathans, the body is covered in skin, with neither dermal nor epidermal scales. The skin of hagfish has copious slime glands, the slime constituting their defense mechanism. The slime can sometimes clog up enemy fishes' gills, causing them to die. In direct contrast, many extinct agnathans sported extensive exoskeletons composed of either massive, heavy dermal armour or small mineralized scales.

=== Appendages ===
Almost all agnathans, including all extant agnathans, have no paired appendages, although most do have a dorsal or a caudal fin. Some fossil agnathans, such as osteostracans and pituriaspids, did have paired fins, a trait inherited in their jawed descendants.

== Reproduction ==
Fertilization in lampreys is external. Mode of fertilization in hagfishes is not known. Development in both groups probably is external. There is no known parental care. Not much is known about the hagfish reproductive process. It is believed that hagfish only have 30 eggs over a lifetime. There is very little of the larval stage that characterizes the lamprey. Lamprey are only able to reproduce once. Lampreys reproduce in freshwater riverbeds, working in pairs to build a nest and burying their eggs about an inch beneath the sediment. The resulting hatchlings go through four years of larval development before becoming adults.

== Evolution ==
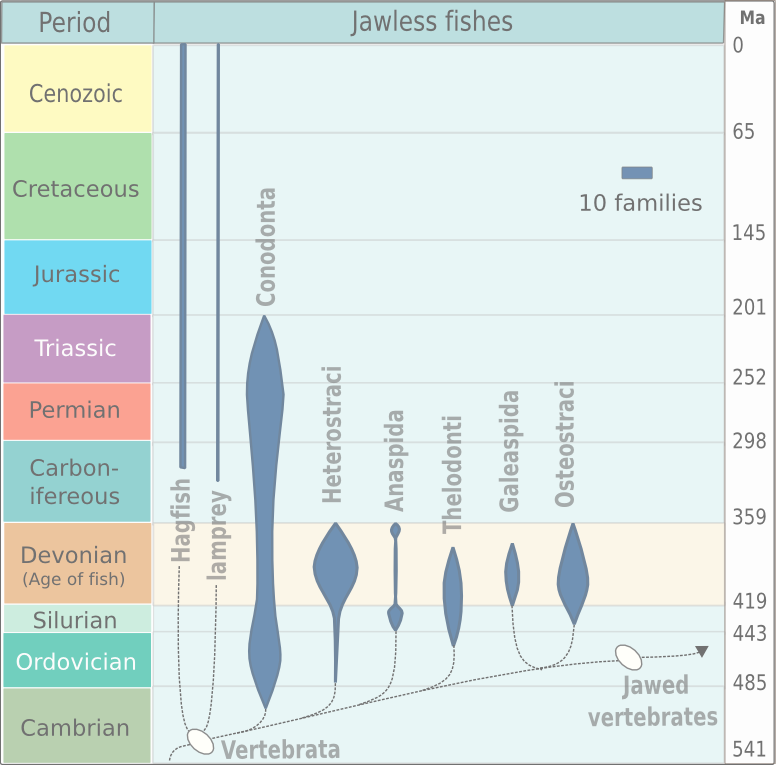
Evolution of jawless fishes. The diagram is based on Michael Benton, 2005.

Although a minor element of modern marine fauna, agnathans were prominent among the early fish in the early Paleozoic. Two types of Early Cambrian animal apparently having fins, vertebrate musculature, and gills are known from the early Cambrian Maotianshan shales of China: Haikouichthys and Myllokunmingia. They have been tentatively assigned to Agnatha by Janvier. A third possible agnathan from the same region is Haikouella. A possible agnathan that has not been formally described was reported by Simonetti from the Middle Cambrian Burgess Shale of British Columbia. Conodonts, a class of agnathans which arose in the early Cambrian, remained common enough until their extinction in the Triassic that their teeth (the only parts of them that were usually fossilized) are often used as index fossils from the late Cambrian to the Triassic.

Many Ordovician, Silurian, and Devonian agnathans were armored with heavy bony-spiky plates. The first armored agnathans—the ostracoderms, precursors to the bony fish and hence to the tetrapods (including humans)—are known from the middle Ordovician, and by the Late Silurian the agnathans had reached the high point of their evolution. Most of the ostracoderms, such as thelodonts, osteostracans, and galeaspids, were more closely related to the gnathostomes than to the surviving agnathans, known as cyclostomes. Cyclostomes apparently split from other agnathans before the evolution of dentine and bone, which are present in many fossil agnathans, including conodonts. Agnathans declined in the Devonian and never recovered.

Approximately 500 million years ago, two types of recombinatorial adaptive immune systems (AISs) arose in vertebrates. The jawed vertebrates diversify their repertoire of immunoglobulin domain-based T and B cell antigen receptors mainly through the rearrangement of V(D)J gene segments and somatic hypermutation, but none of the fundamental AIS recognition elements in jawed vertebrates have been found in jawless vertebrates. Instead, the AIS of jawless vertebrates is based on variable lymphocyte receptors (VLRs) that are generated through recombinatorial usage of a large panel of highly diverse leucine-rich repeat (LRR) sequences. Three VLR genes (VLRA, VLRB, and VLRC) have been identified in lampreys and hagfish, and are expressed on three distinct lymphocytes lineages. VLRA+ cells and VLRC+ cells are T-cell-like and develop in a thymus-like lympho-epithelial structure, termed thymoids. VLRB+ cells are B-cell-like, develop in hematopoietic organs, and differentiate into "VLRB antibody"-secreting plasma cells.

== Classification ==
Subgroups of jawless fish
Subgroup		Example	Comments
Cyclostomi	Myxini	Eptatretus hexatrema (sixgill hagfish)	Myxini (hagfish) are eel-shaped slime-producing marine animals (occasionally called slime eels). They are the only known living animals that have a skull but not a vertebral column. The group has gone through the most extensive gene loss of all vertebrates, with 1,386 missing gene families. Along with lampreys, hagfish are jawless and are living fossils; hagfish are basal to vertebrates, and living hagfish remain similar to hagfish 300 million years ago. The classification of hagfish has been controversial. The issue is whether the hagfish is itself a degenerate type of vertebrate-fish (most closely related to lampreys), or else may represent a stage which precedes the evolution of the vertebral column (as do lancelets). The original scheme groups hagfish and lampreys together as cyclostomes (or historically, Agnatha), as the oldest surviving clade of vertebrates alongside gnathostomes (the now-ubiquitous jawed-vertebrates). An alternative scheme proposed that jawed-vertebrates are more closely related to lampreys than to hagfish (i.e., that vertebrates include lampreys but exclude hagfish), and introduces the category Craniata to group vertebrates near hagfish. Recent DNA evidence has supported the original scheme.
Cyclostomi	Petromyzontida	Entosphenus tridentatus (Pacific lamprey)	Petromyzontida, also called Hyperoartia, is a disputed group of vertebrates that includes the modern lampreys and their fossil relatives. Examples of hyperoartians from early in their fossil record are Endeiolepis and Euphanerops, fish-like animals with hypocercal tails that lived during the Late Devonian Period. Some paleontologists still place these forms among the "ostracoderms" (jawless armored "fishes") of the class Anaspida, but this is increasingly considered an artificial arrangement based on ancestral traits. Placement of this group among the jawless vertebrates is a matter of dispute. While today enough fossil diversity is known to make a close relationship among the "ostracoderms" unlikely, this has muddied the issue of the Hyperoartia's closest relatives. Traditionally, the group was placed in a superclass Cyclostomata together with the Myxini (hagfishes). More recently, it has been proposed that the Myxini are more basal among the skull-bearing chordates, while the Hyperoartia are retained among vertebrates. But even though this may be correct, the lampreys represent one of the oldest divergences of the vertebrate lineage, and whether they are better united with some "ostracoderms" in the Cephalaspidomorphi, or not closer to these than to e.g. to other "ostracoderms" of the Pteraspidomorphi, or even the long-extinct conodonts, is still to be resolved. Even the very existence of the Hyperoartia is disputed, with some analyses favoring a treatment of the "basal Hyperoartia" as a monophyletic lineage Jamoytiiformes that may in fact be very close to the ancestral jawed vertebrates.
†Myllokunmingiida		Haikouichthys ercaicunensis	The myllokunmingiids were a primitive order of agnathans that were endemic to the Cambrian aged Maotianshan Shales lagerstätte in China. These creatures are the earliest known group of craniates (chordates with a skull of hard bone or cartilage). Currently the group includes 3 known genera, Haikouichthys, Myllokunmingia, and Zhongjianichthys.
†Conodonta		Panderodus unicostatus	Conodonts were eel like agnathans that lived from the Cambrian up until the beginning of the Jurassic period. They were very diverse in terms of lifestyles, with some species being filter feeders and others being macropredators. For over a century, these animals were only known because of their microscopic, phosphatic tooth structures called "conodont elements". It was not until the mid-1980s that body fossils of conodonts were found in Scotland and Wisconsin, showing these animals true appearance. Their teeth make great index fossils, as many species lived and died out in a relatively short period of time. These fish reached their peak in diversity during the middle of the Ordovician, but were hit hard by the Ordovician-Silurian extinction event. They then reached another spike in diversity in the mid-late Devonian before again declining in the Carboniferous. They were relatively rare in the Permian, but dramatically increased in numbers in the early Triassic. Despite this, they went extinct during the lower Jurassic period, with some of the last surviving populations being in Japan. They possibly survived longer there due to the relative remoteness of the area. Originally, it was thought that they were wiped out by the large extinction at the end of the Triassic. Instead, it is now thought that they were out competed by newer Mesozoic taxa.
†"Ostracodermi"	†Anaspida	Pharyngolepis (top) and Rhyncholepis (bottom)	Anaspida (without shield) is an extinct group of primitive jawless vertebrates that lived during the Silurian and Devonian periods. They are classically regarded as the ancestors of lampreys. Anaspids were small marine agnathans that lacked heavy bony shield and paired fins, but have a striking highly hypocercal tail. They first appeared in the Early Silurian, and flourished until the Late Devonian extinction, where most species, save for lampreys, became extinct due to the environmental upheaval during that time.
†"Ostracodermi"	†Pteraspidomorphi	Astraspis desiderata	^{†}Pteraspidomorphi is an extinct group of early jawless fish. The fossils show extensive shielding of the head. Many had hypocercal tails in order to generate lift to increase ease of movement through the water for their armoured bodies, which were covered in dermal bone. They also had sucking mouth parts and some species may have lived in fresh water. The taxon contains the subgroups Heterostraci, Astraspida, Arandaspida.
†"Ostracodermi"	†Thelodonti	Lanarkia (top left), Loganellia (top right and middle right) and Furcacauda (bottom)	Thelodonti (nipple teeth) are a group of small, extinct jawless fishes with distinctive scales instead of large plates of armour. There is much debate over whether the group of Palaeozoic fish known as the Thelodonti (formerly coelolepids) represent a monophyletic grouping, or disparate stem groups to the major lines of jawless and jawed fish. Thelodonts are united in possession of "thelodont scales". This defining character is not necessarily a result of shared ancestry, as it may have been evolved independently by different groups. Thus the thelodonts are generally thought to represent a polyphyletic group, although there is no firm agreement on this point; if they are monophyletic, there is no firm evidence on what their ancestral state was. "Thelodonts" were morphologically very similar, and probably closely related, to fish of the classes Heterostraci and Anaspida, differing mainly in their covering of distinctive, small, spiny scales. These scales were easily dispersed after death; their small size and resilience makes them the most common vertebrate fossil of their time. The fish lived in both freshwater and marine environments, first appearing during the Ordovician, and perishing during the Frasnian–Famennian extinction event of the Late Devonian. They occupied a large variety of ecological niches, with a large amount of species preferring reef ecosystems, where their flexible bodies were more at ease than the heavily armoured bulks of other jawless fish.
†"Ostracodermi"	†Pituriaspida	Neeyambaspis enigmatica (upper middle) and Pituriaspis doylei (lower middle)	Pituriaspida ('pituri-shields') are a small group of extinct armoured jawless fishes with tremendous nose-like rostrums, which lived in the marine, deltaic environments of Middle Devonian Australia (about 390 Ma). They are known only by two species, Pituriaspis doylei and Neeyambaspis enigmatica found in a single sandstone location of the Georgina Basin, in Western Queensland, Australia.
†"Ostracodermi"	†Galeaspida	Basal galeaspids, Hanyangaspis (left), Dayongaspis (middle) and Xiushuiaspis (right)	Galeaspida ('helmet-shields') have massive bone shield on the head. Galeaspida lived in shallow, fresh water and marine environments during the Silurian and Devonian times (430 to 370 million years ago) in what is now Southern China, Tibet and Vietnam. Superficially, their morphology appears more similar to that of Heterostraci than Osteostraci, and one species, Tujiaaspis vividus, had paired fins. Galeaspida are regarded as being more closely related to Osteostraci, based on the closer similarity of the morphology of the braincase.
†"Ostracodermi"	†Osteostraci	Cephalaspis lyelli	Osteostraci ('bony-shells') lived in what is now North America, Europe and Russia from the Middle Silurian to Late Devonian. Anatomically speaking, the osteostracans, especially the Devonian species, were among the most advanced of all known agnathans. This is due to the development of paired fins, and their complicated cranial anatomy. The osteostracans were more similar to lampreys than to jawed vertebrates in possessing two pairs of semicircular canals in the inner ear, as opposed to the three pairs found in the inner ears of jawed vertebrates. They are thought to be the sister-group of pituriaspids. Together, these two taxa of jawless vertebrates are the sister-group of gnathostomes. Several synapomorphies support this hypothesis, such as the presence of: sclerotic ossicles, paired pectoral fins, a dermal skeleton with three layers (a basal layer of isopedin, a middle layer of spongy bone, and a superficial layer of dentin), and perichondral bone.

== Phylogeny ==
Phylogeny based on the work of Mikko Haaramo and Delsuc et al.

- Vertebrata/ Craniata
  - Cyclostomata
    - Hyperotreti/Myxini (hagfishes)
    - Petromyzontomorpha (lampreys)
  - - ?†Conodonta
    - - †Pteraspidomorpha
      - Myopterygii
        - Anaspidomorphi
          - ?†Jamoytiiformes
          - ?†Euphanerida
          - †Anaspida
        - - †Thelodonti
          - - - †Galeaspida
              - - †Pituriaspida
                - - †Osteostraci
                  - Gnathostomata (vertebrates with jaws)

Agnatha can not be consolidated into a coherent grouping without either removing any non-Cyclostomata, or by including all Vertebrata thus rendering it into a junior synonym of Vertebrata.

In 2023, Reeves and colleagues conducted a phylogenetic analyses on the placement of Lasanius based on the character dataset from Miyashita et al. (2019). They recovered a maximum consensus parsimony tree here simplified, with taxa traditionally referred to Agnatha marked by the coloured bracket:

- Vertebrata total group
  - †Haikouella
  - - †Metaspriggina
    - †Myllokunmingiida
    - Vertebrata crown group
      - Cyclostomi total group
        - †Anaspida
          - †Birkeniida
          - - †Lasanius
            - - †Jamoytius
              - †Euphanerops
        - - †Euconodonta
          - Cyclostomi crown group
            - Myxinoidea
            - Petromyzontida
      - Gnathostomata total group
        - †Pteraspidomorphi
          - †Astraspis
          - - †Arandaspida
            - †Heterostraci
        - - †Thelodonti
            - †Furcacaudiformes
            - †Thelodontiformes
          - - †Pituriaspida
            - - †Galeaspida
              - - †Osteostraci
                - Gnathostomata (traditional usage)
                  - †Antiarchi
                  - - †Arthrodira
                    - Gnathostomata crown group
                      - Osteichthyes
                      - Chondrichthyes

== See also ==
- Gnathostomata
- Amphirhina, an alternate name for the above parallel, or sister, classification
- Cyclostomata
