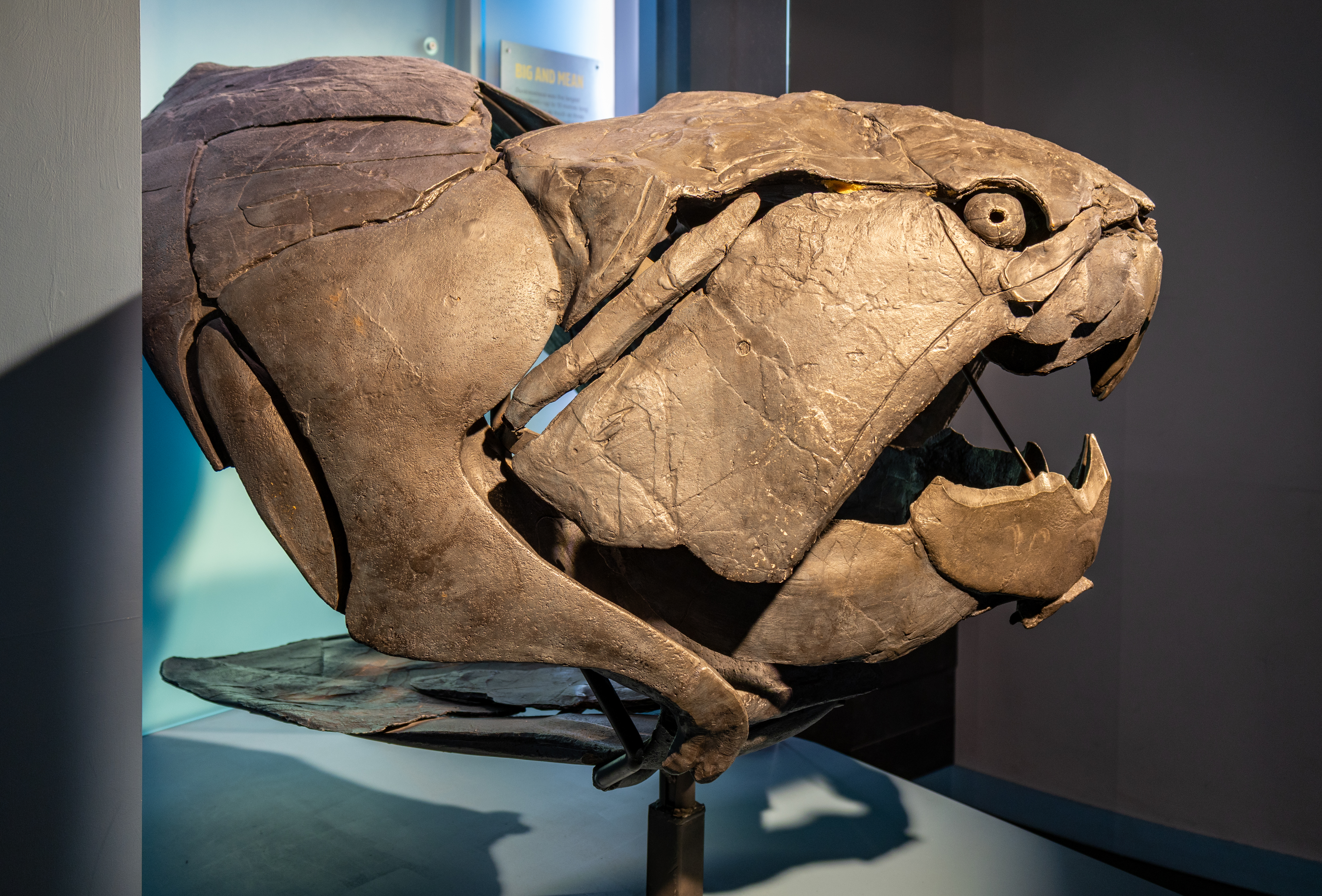
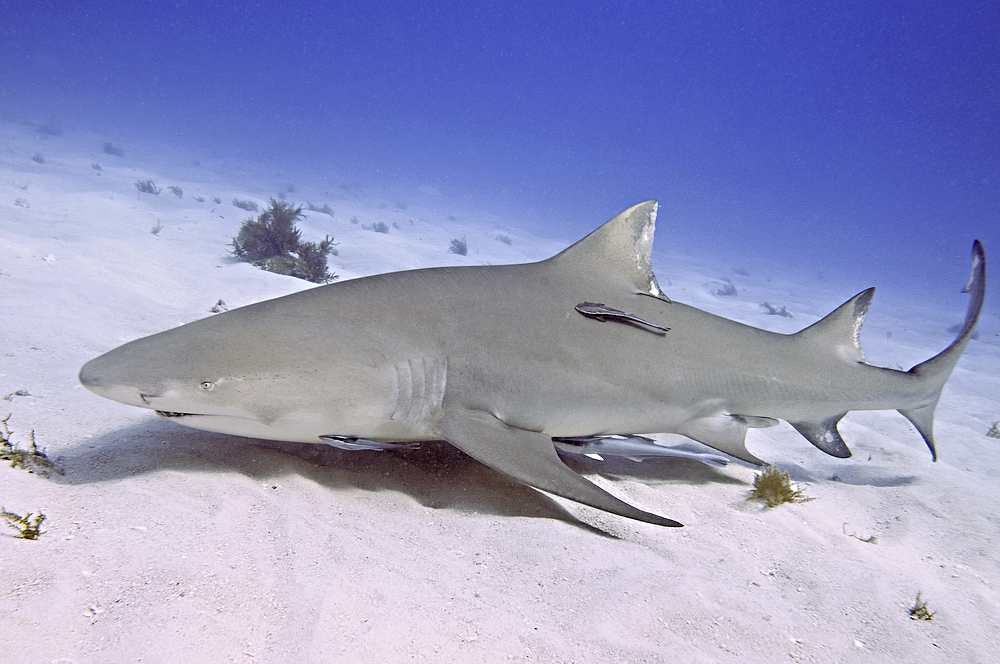
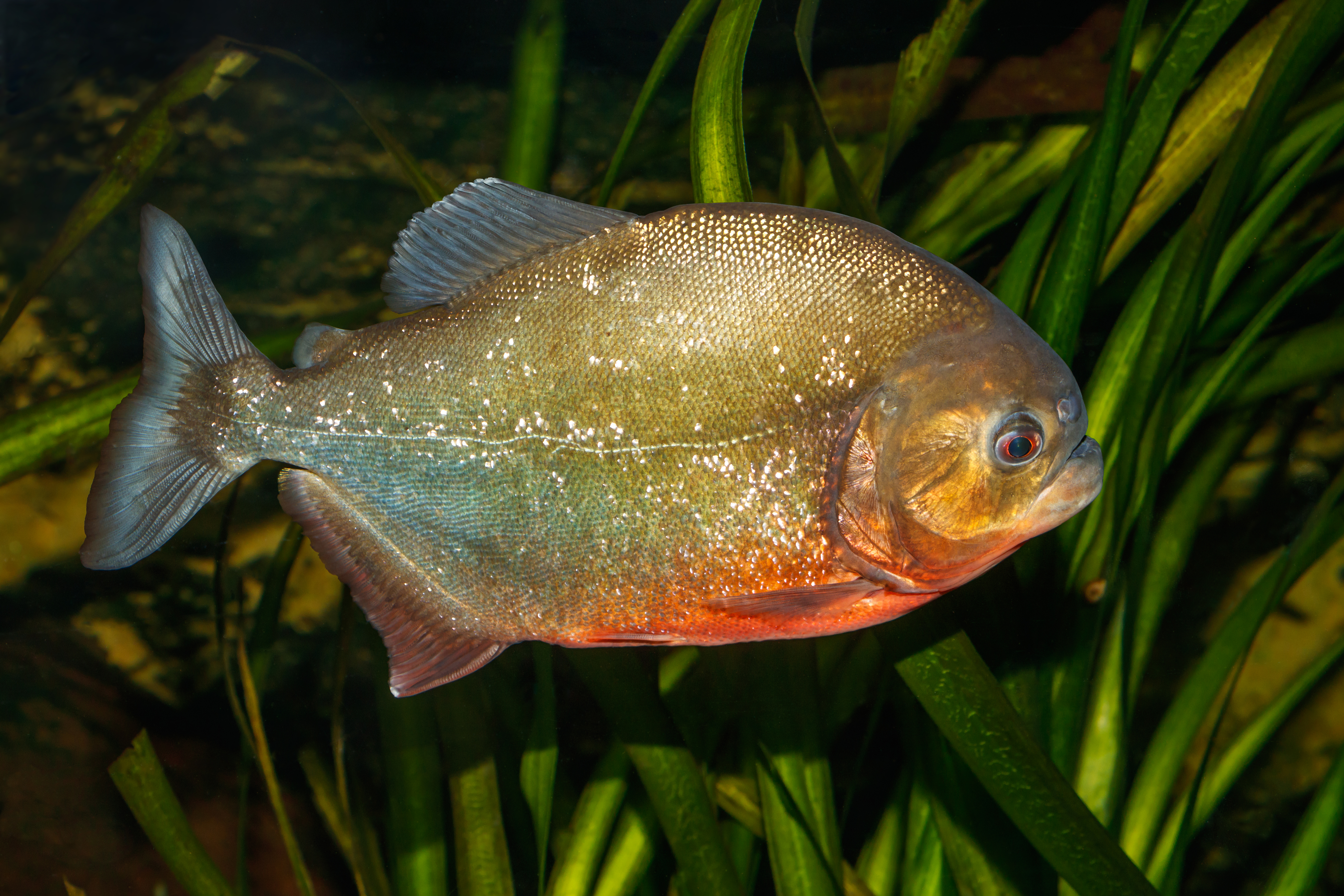
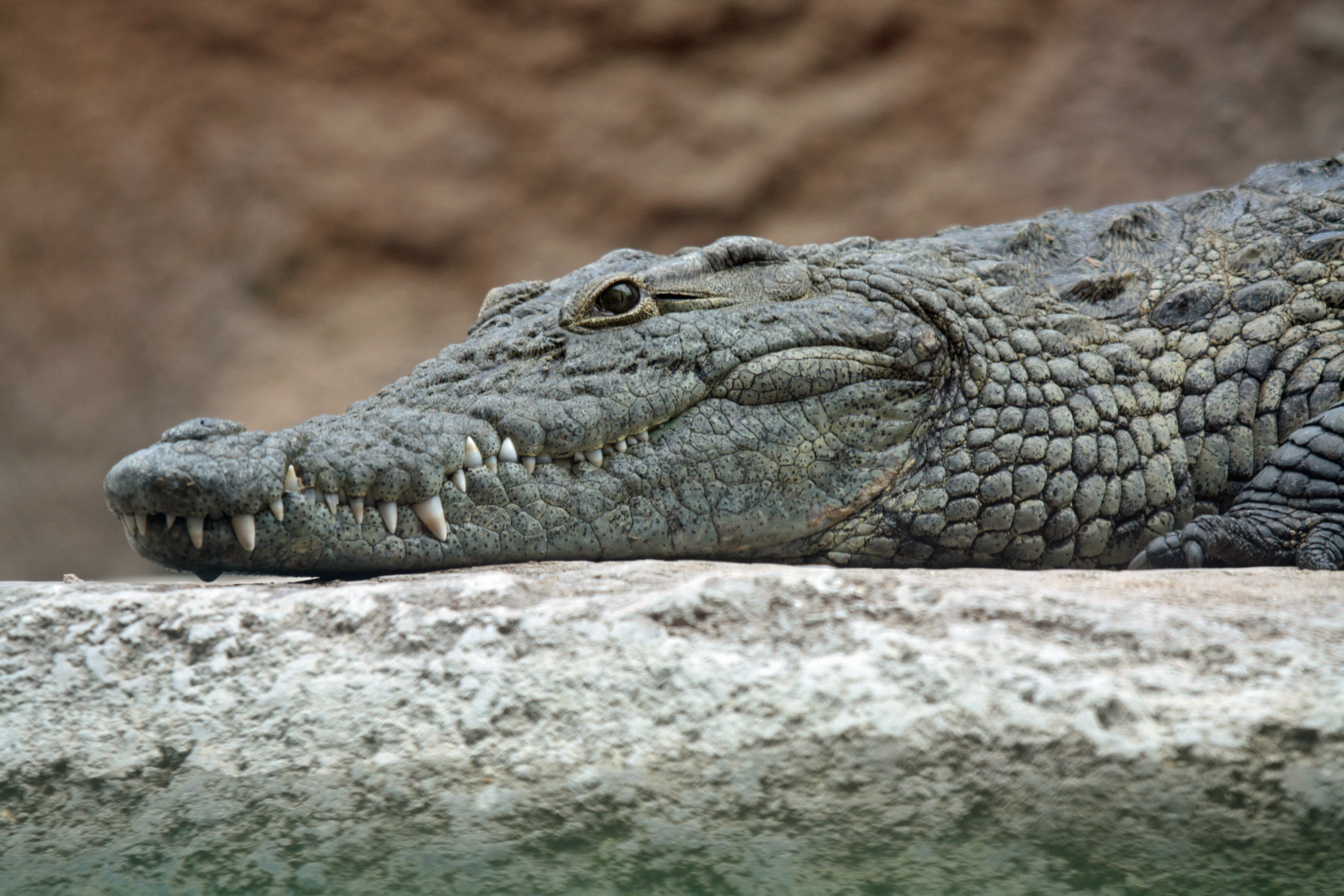
- Examples of jawed vertebrates (clockwise from top left): Dunkleosteus (Placodermi), lemon shark (Chondrichthyes), red-bellied piranha (Actinopterygii), and Nile crocodile (Tetrapoda).

Scientific classification
- Kingdom: Animalia
- Phylum: Chordata
- Clade: Olfactores
- Subphylum: Vertebrata
- Infraphylum: Gnathostomata; Gegenbauer, 1874

Subgroups
- †"Placodermi"; Eugnathostomata; Total group Chondrichthyes; †"Acanthodii"; Chondrichthyes (cartilaginous fishes); Osteichthyes (bony fish, including tetrapods)

= Gnathostomata =

Jawed vertebrates Temporal range: Early Silurian–Holocene, 439–0 Ma (Possible Late Ordovician record, 444 Ma)

Infraphylum of vertebrates

Gnathostomata (/ˌnæθoʊˈstɒmətə/; from Ancient Greek: γνάθος (gnathos) 'jaw' + στόμα (stoma) 'mouth') are jawed vertebrates. Gnathostome diversity comprises roughly 60,000 species, which accounts for 99% of all extant vertebrates, including all living bony fishes (both ray-finned and lobe-finned, including the terrestrial tetrapods) and cartilaginous fishes, as well as extinct prehistoric fish such as placoderms and acanthodians. Most gnathostomes have retained ancestral traits like true teeth, a stomach, and paired appendages (pectoral and pelvic fins, limbs, wings, etc.). Other traits are elastin, horizontal semicircular canal of the inner ear, myelinated neurons, and an adaptive immune system which has discrete lymphoid organs (spleen and thymus) and uses V(D)J recombination to create antigen recognition sites, rather than using genetic recombination in the variable lymphocyte receptor gene.

It is now assumed that Gnathostomata evolved from ancestors that already possessed two pairs of paired fins. Until recently these ancestors, known as antiarchs, were thought to have lacked pectoral or pelvic fins. In addition to this, some placoderms were shown to have a third pair of paired appendages, that had been modified to claspers in males and pelvic basal plates in females—a pattern not seen in any other vertebrate group. The jawless Osteostraci are generally considered the closest sister taxon of Gnathostomata.

Jaw development in vertebrates is likely a product of bending the first pair of gill arches. This development would help suck water into the mouth by the movement of the jaw, so that it would then pass over the gills via buccal pumping for gas exchange. The repetitive use of the newly formed jaw bones would eventually lead to the ability to bite in some gnathostomes.

Newer research suggests that a branch of placoderms was most likely the ancestor of present-day gnathostomes. A 419-million-year-old fossil of a placoderm named Entelognathus had a bony oral skeleton and anatomical details associated with cartilaginous and bony fish, demonstrating that the absence of a bony skeleton in cartilaginous fish is a derived trait. The fossil findings of primitive bony fishes such as Guiyu oneiros and Psarolepis, which lived contemporaneously with Entelognathus and had pelvic girdles more in common with placoderms than with other bony fish, show that it was a relative rather than a direct ancestor of the extant gnathostomes. It also indicates that spiny sharks and Chondrichthyes represent a single sister group to the bony fishes. Fossil findings of juvenile placoderms, which had true teeth that grew on the surface of the jawbone and had no roots, making them impossible to replace or regrow as they broke or wore down as they grew older, proves the common ancestor of all gnathostomes had teeth and place the origin of teeth along with, or soon after, the evolution of jaws.

Late Ordovician-aged microfossils of what have been identified as scales of either acanthodians or "spiny sharks", may mark Gnathostomata's first appearance in the fossil record. Undeniably unambiguous gnathostome fossils, mostly of primitive acanthodians, begin appearing by the early Silurian, and become abundant by the start of the Devonian.

== Classification ==
Gnathostomata is traditionally an infraphylum, broken into three top-level groupings: Chondrichthyes, or the cartilaginous fish; Placodermi, an extinct grade of armored fish; and Teleostomi, which includes the familiar classes of bony fish, birds, mammals, reptiles, and amphibians. Some classification systems have used the term Amphirhina. It is a sister group of the Agnatha (jawless fish).

- Vertebrata: Gnathostomata
  - - †Placodermi (paraphyletic)
    - Eugnathostomata
      - Chondrichthyes and †Acanthodians (paraphyletic)
      - Euteleostomi / Osteichthyes
        - Actinopterygii
        - Sarcopterygii: Tetrapoda
          - - Amphibia
            - Amniota
              - Sauropsida
                - Sauria
              - Synapsida
                - Mammalia

Subgroups of jawed vertebrates
Subgroup	Common name	Example	Comments
^{†} Placodermi (extinct)	Armoured fish	Coccosteus	^{†}Placodermi (plate-skinned) is an extinct class of armoured prehistoric fish, known from fossils, which lived from the late Silurian to the end of the Devonian Period. Their head and thorax were covered by articulated armoured plates and the rest of the body was scaled or naked, depending on the species. Placoderms were among the first jawed fish; their jaws likely evolved from the first of their gill arches. A 380-million-year-old fossil of one species represents the oldest known example of live birth. The first identifiable placoderms evolved in the late Silurian; they began a dramatic decline during the Late Devonian extinctions, and the class was entirely extinct by the end of the Devonian.
Chondrichthyes	Cartilaginous fishes	Great white shark	Chondrichthyes (cartilage-fish) or cartilaginous fishes are jawed fish with paired fins, paired nares, scales, a heart with its chambers in series, and skeletons made of cartilage rather than bone. The class is divided into two subclasses: Elasmobranchii (sharks, rays and skates) and Holocephali (chimaeras, sometimes called ghost sharks, which are sometimes separated into their own class). Within the infraphylum Gnathostomata, cartilaginous fishes are distinct from all other jawed vertebrates, the extant members of which all fall into Teleostomi.
^{†} Acanthodii (extinct)	Spiny sharks	Acanthodes bronni	^{†}Acanthodii, or spiny sharks are a class of extinct fishes, sharing features with both bony and cartilaginous fishes, now understood to be a paraphyletic assemblage leading to modern Chondrichthyes. In form they resembled sharks, but their epidermis was covered with tiny rhomboid platelets like the scales of holosteans (gars, bowfins). They may have been an independent phylogenetic branch of fishes, which had evolved from little-specialized forms close to recent Chondrichthyes. Acanthodians did, in fact, have a cartilaginous skeleton, but their fins had a wide, bony base and were reinforced on their anterior margin with a dentine spine. They are distinguished in two respects: they were the earliest known jawed vertebrates, and they had stout spines supporting their fins, fixed in place and non-movable (like a shark's dorsal fin). The acanthodians' jaws are presumed to have evolved from the first gill arch of some ancestral jawless fishes that had a gill skeleton made of pieces of jointed cartilage. The common name "spiny sharks" is really a misnomer for these early jawed fishes. The name was coined because they were superficially shark-shaped, with a streamlined body, paired fins, and a strongly upturned tail; stout bony spines supported all the fins except the tail – hence, "spiny sharks". The earliest recorded acanthodian, Fanjingshania renovata, comes from the lower Silurian (Aeronian) of China and it is also the oldest jawed vertebrate with known anatomical features. Coeval to Fanjingshania is the tooth-based acanthodian species Qianodus duplicis that represents the oldest unequivocal toothed vertebrate.
Osteichthyes	Bony fishes	Blue runner	Osteichthyes (bone-fish) or bony fishes are a taxonomic group of fish that have bone, as opposed to cartilaginous skeletons. The vast majority of fish are osteichthyans, which is an extremely diverse and abundant group consisting of 45 orders, with over 435 families and 28,000 species. It is the largest class of vertebrates in existence today. Osteichthyes is divided into the ray-finned fish (Actinopterygii) and lobe-finned fish (Sarcopterygii). The oldest known fossils of bony fish are about 420 million years ago, which are also transitional fossils, showing a tooth pattern that is in between the tooth rows of sharks and bony fishes.
Tetrapoda	Tetrapods	Fire salamander	Tetrapoda (four-feet) or tetrapods are the group of all four-limbed vertebrates, including living and extinct amphibians, reptiles, birds, and mammals. Amphibians today generally remain semi-aquatic, living the first stage of their lives as fish-like tadpoles. Several groups of tetrapods, such as the reptilian snakes and mammalian cetaceans, have lost some or all of their limbs, and many tetrapods have returned to partially aquatic or (in the case of cetaceans and sirenians) fully aquatic lives. The tetrapods evolved from the lobe-finned fishes about 395 million years ago in the Devonian. The specific aquatic ancestors of the tetrapods, and the process by which land colonization occurred, remain unclear, and are areas of active research and debate among palaeontologists at present.

== Evolution ==
Vertebrate classes

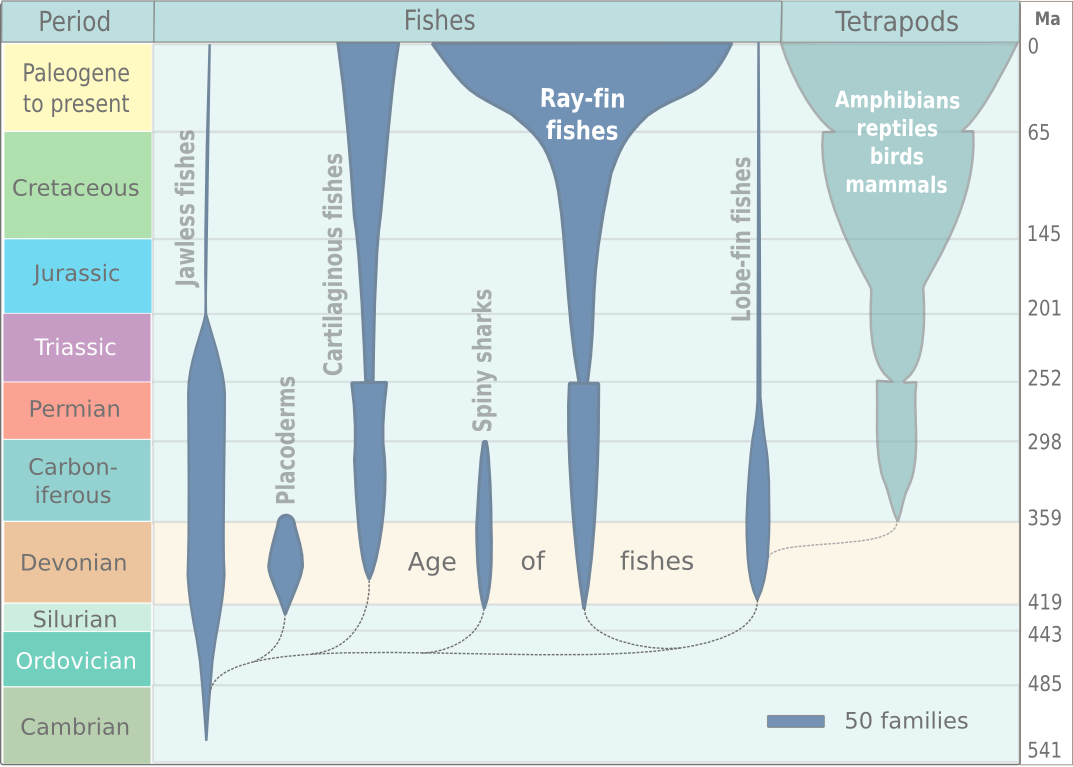
Spindle diagram for the evolution of fish and other vertebrate classes. The earliest classes that developed jaws were the now extinct placoderms and the spiny sharks.

The appearance of the early vertebrate jaw has been described as "a crucial innovation" and "perhaps the most profound and radical evolutionary step in the vertebrate history". Fish without jaws had more difficulty surviving than fish with jaws, and most jawless fish became extinct during the Triassic period. However studies of the cyclostomes, the jawless hagfishes and lampreys that did survive, have yielded little insight into the deep remodelling of the vertebrate skull that must have taken place as early jaws evolved.

The ancestor of all jawed vertebrates had gone through two rounds of whole genome duplication. The first happened before the gnathostome and cyclostome split, and appears to have been an autopolyploidy event (happened within the same species). The second occurred after the split, and was an allopolyploidy event (the result of hybridization between two lineages).

The customary view is that jaws are homologous to the gill arches. In jawless fishes a series of gills opened behind the mouth, and these gills became supported by cartilaginous elements. The first set of these elements surrounded the mouth to form the jaw. The upper portion of the second embryonic arch supporting the gill became the hyomandibular bone of jawed fish, which supports the skull and therefore links the jaw to the cranium. The hyomandibula is a set of bones found in the hyoid region in most fishes. It usually plays a role in suspending the jaws or the operculum in the case of teleosts.

While potentially older Ordovician records are known, the oldest unambigious evidence of jawed vertebrates are Qianodus and Fanjingshania from the early Silurian (Aeronian) of Guizhou, China around 439 million years ago, which are placed as acanthodian-grade stem-chondrichthyans.
