= List of fossil sites =

This list of fossil sites is a worldwide list of localities known well for the presence of fossils. Some entries in this list are notable for a single, unique find, while others are notable for the large number of fossils found there. Many of the entries in this list are considered Lagerstätten (sedimentary deposits that exhibits extraordinary fossils with exceptional preservation—sometimes including preserved soft tissues). Lagerstätten are indicated by a note ( (Note: This site and/or formation is considered a Lagerstätte.)) in the noteworthiness column.

Fossils may be found either associated with a geological formation or at a single geographic site. Geological formations consist of rock that was deposited during a specific period of time. They usually extend for large areas, and sometimes there are different important sites in which the same formation is exposed. Such sites may have separate entries if they are considered to be more notable than the formation as a whole. In contrast, extensive formations associated with large areas may be equivalently represented at many locations. Such formations may be listed either without a site, with a site or sites that represent the type locality, or with multiple sites of note. When a type locality is listed as the site for a formation with many good outcrops, the site is flagged with a note ( (Note: This site is an example or type locality for an extensive fossil-bearing formation.)). When a particular site of note is listed for an extensive fossil-bearing formation, but that site is somehow atypical, it is also flagged with a note ( (Note: This site occurs within a widespread fossil bearing formation, but is noteworthy for additional reasons not typical of that formation.)).

Many formations are for all practical purposes only studied at a single site, and may not even be named. For example, sites associated with hominin, particularly caves, are frequently not identified with a named geologic formation. Therefore, some sites are listed without an associated formation.

== List of sites ==
Site	Group, Formation, or Unit	Age	Continent	Country	Noteworthiness
Afar Depression		Pliocene	Africa	Ethiopia	
Buia, Danakil Depression		Pleistocene	Africa	Eritrea	Hominin
Ahl al Oughlam		Late Pliocene	Africa	Morocco	
	Ameki Formation	Middle Eocene	Africa	Nigeria	
Awash River		Pliocene	Africa	Ethiopia	Hominin
Cradle of Humankind: Coopers Cave; Gladysvale Cave; Kromdraai; Malapa; Motsetsi; Plovers Lake; Sterkfontein; Swartkrans; and others		Pliocene – Pleistocene	Africa	South Africa	Hominin
Hoedjiespunt		Pleistocene	Africa	South Africa	Hominin
Hofmeyr		Pleistocene	Africa	South Africa	Hominin
Alnif		Cambrian – Late Permian	Africa	Morocco	Trilobites
Jebel Irhoud		Pleistocene	Africa	Morocco	Hominin
	Jebel Qatrani Formation	Eocene – Oligocene	Africa	Egypt	Mammals, birds
Golden Gate Highlands National Park	Karoo Supergroup	Permian – Early Jurassic	Africa	Southern Africa	
Gats River Fossil Bed	Karoo Supergroup	Permian	Africa	South Africa	Therapsida
Klasies River Caves		Pleistocene (Middle Stone Age)	Africa	South Africa	Hominin: Early Humans
Koobi Fora		Pliocene – Pleistocene	Africa	Kenya	Hominin, stone tools
Koro Toro		Pliocene	Africa	Chad	Hominin
Laetoli		Pliocene – Pleistocene	Africa	Tanzania	Hominin footprints
Ledi-Geraru		Pliocene (Piacenzian)	Africa	Ethiopia	Hominin: LD 350-1, oldest fossil in genus Homo
Lothagam		Miocene – Pliocene	Africa	Kenya	Hominin and other mammals
Berivotra	Maevarano Formation	Late Cretaceous	Africa	Madagascar	Dinosaurs (Non-Avian), Crocodylomorphs
Kem Kem Beds		Late Cretaceous	Africa	Morocco	Non-Avian Dinosaurs, Crocodylomorphs, etc.
Kamabai rock shelter		Pleistocene	Africa	Sierra Leone	Hominin tools
Olduvai Gorge		Pliocene	Africa	Tanzania	Hominin
Omo Kibish	Omo Kibish Formation (= Kibish Formation)	Pliocene – Pleistocene	Africa	Ethiopia	Hominin: australopithecine remains and stone tools
Orapa diamond mine		Late Cretaceous	Africa	Botswana	Flowering Plants, Insects
	Qasr el Sagha Formation	Eocene	Africa	Egypt	
Rusinga Island		Miocene	Africa	Kenya	Hominin, mammals
	Shungura Formation	Pliocene – Early Pleistocene	Africa	Ethiopia	Hominin tools
Soom Shale	Table Mountain Group (Cederberg Formation)	Late Ordovician	Africa	South Africa	Typical Ordovician microfossils, such as chitinozoa, acritarchs and spores, in addition to shelly and soft tissue fauna.
Taung		Pliocene	Africa	South Africa	Hominin
	Tendaguru Formation	Late Jurassic	Africa	Tanzania	Non-Avian Dinosaurs, etc.
West Coast Fossil Park		Terminal Miocene/Early Pliocene	Africa	South Africa	
Yengema		Neolithic	Africa	Sierra Leone	Hominin tools
Seymour Island	Cross Valley Formation	Late Paleocene	Antarctica		
Seymour Island	La Meseta Formation	Eocene	Antarctica		Birds, particularly penguins
Seymour Island	López de Bertodano Formation	Late Cretaceous – Early Paleocene (Maastrichtian – Danian)	Antarctica		Non- Avian Dinosaurs, Birds
Seymour Island	Sobral Formation	Paleocene (Danian)	Antarctica		
Vega Island	López de Bertodano Formation	Late Cretaceous – Early Paleocene (Maastrichtian – Danian)	Antarctica		Non-Avian Dinosaurs, Birds
Longing Peninsula	Nordenskjöld Formation	Jurassic	Antarctica		
Mount Kirkpatrick	Hanson Formation	Early Jurassic	Antarctica	Ross dependency	Dinosaurs, prosauropods, trees|
James Ross Island	Santa Marta Formation; Snow Hill Island Formation	Late Cretaceous	Antarctica		Dinosaurs
Mount Falla	Falla Formation	Triassic	Antarctica		
Fremouw Peak	Fremouw Formation	Triassic	Antarctica	Ross Dependency	
Cumulus Hills	Thrinaxodon Col	Triassic	Antarctica	Ross Dependency	
	Aguja Formation	Late Cretaceous	North America	US: Texas and Mexico: Chihuahua, Coahuila	
Ashfall Fossil Beds	Ash Hollow Formation (Ogallala Group)	Miocene (Clarendonian)	North America	US: Nebraska	Mammals
Astoria, Oregon	Astoria Formation	Miocene	North America	US: Oregon	
Cutler Fossil Site	Sinkhole in Miami Limestone	late Pleistocene	North America	US: Florida	humans and vertebrates
Page-Ladson site	Sinkhole in Suwannee Limestone	Pleistocene/Holocene	North America	US: Florida	Hominin, human/mastodon coexistence
White Rock Creek (Dallas, Texas)	Austin Chalk	Late Cretaceous	North America	US: Texas	
Travis County, Texas	Austin Chalk	Late Cretaceous	North America	US: Texas	
Beecher's Trilobite Bed	Frankfort Formation	Ordovician	North America	US: New York	Trilobites
Mount Blanco	Blanco Formation	Pliocene/Pleistocene	North America	US: Kansas, Texas	Blancan fauna
Blue Beach		Tournaisian	North America	Canada: Nova Scotia	
Little Bob Quarry, Bobcaygeon, Ontario	Bobcaygeon Formation	Ordovician	North America	Canada: Ontario	
Bone Cabin Quarry	Morrison Formation	Jurassic	North America	US: Wyoming	Non-Avian Dinosaurs
Fitterer Ranch; Obritsch Ranch; Little Badlands in Stark County; Badlands National Park	Brule Formation	Oligocene	North America	US: South Dakota	Mammals, sunfish, cat fish
Kootenay National Park	Burgess Shale	Cambrian (Albertan)	North America	Canada: British Columbia	
Calvert Cliffs State Park	Calvert Formation	Miocene	North America	US: Maryland	Middle Miocene Climate Transition and Middle Miocene disruption
Goodsell Ridge, Isle La Motte (Lake Champlain)	Chazy Formation	Ordovician	North America	US: Vermont	Early Reef: bryozoa, corals, stromatoporoids
Chuckanut Drive, south of Bellingham, Washington	Chuckanut Formation	Eocene	North America	US: Washington state	Fossil trackways from birds, mammals and turtles
Como Bluff	Cloverly Formation	Early Cretaceous	North America	US: Montana, Wyoming	Non-Avian Dinosaurs, some mammals, turtles, crocodilians, and fish
Coon Creek	Coon Creek Formation	Cretaceous (Maastrichtian)	North America	US: Tennessee and Mississippi	Marine reptiles, particularly mosasaurs and plesiosaurs; Invertebrates: Turritella (sea snails), bryozoans, clams, crabs, shrimp and some sharks
Denali National Park and Preserve	Cantwell Formation	Late Cretaceous	North America	US: Alaska	Non-Avian Dinosaur tracks, plants, insects
Dinosaur Provincial Park	Dinosaur Park Formation	Cretaceous (Campanian)	North America	Canada: Alberta	Non- Avian Dinosaurs
Dinosaur State Park		Jurassic	North America	US: Connecticut	Dinosaur tracks
Driftwood Canyon Provincial Park		Eocene	North America	Canada: British Columbia	Insects and fish
Drumheller, Badlands		Mesozoic	North America	Canada: Alberta	
Ellisdale Fossil Site	Marshalltown Formation	Cretaceous (Campanian)	North America	US: New Jersey	
Ochillee Creek at Old Ochillee	Eutaw Formation	Cretaceous	North America	US: Alabama, Georgia, Mississippi	Dinosaur, mosasaur, and pterosaur
Falls of the Ohio	Jefferson Limestone	Devonian	North America	US: Indiana	Corals (Tabulate coral and Rugosa)
Florissant Fossil Beds	Florissant Formation	Eocene (Priabonian)	North America	US: Colorado	Insects
Fossil Prairie Park		Devonian	North America	US: Iowa	
Mazon Creek	Francis Creek Shale	Carboniferous (Pennsylvanian)	North America	US: Illinois	
Ghost Ranch		Triassic	North America	US: New Mexico	Non-Avian Dinosaurs
Hagerman Fossil Beds National Monument	Glenns Ferry Formation	Pliocene/Pleistocene	North America	US: Idaho	Hagerman horse ('American Zebra'), Camelops
Dinosaur Valley State Park	Glen Rose Formation	Cretaceous (Aptian-Albian)	North America	US: Texas	Dinosaur footprints
Gray Fossil Site		Pliocene	North America	US: Tennessee	Mammals
Fossil Butte National Monument	Green River Formation	Eocene	North America	US: Utah, Colorado, and Wyoming	Fishes
Schreiber, Ontario	Gunflint Chert	Late Archaean – Early Proterozoic	North America	Canada: western Ontario & US: Minnesota (Gunflint Range)	Stromatolite colonies of cyanobacteria
Hilda mega-bonebed	Dinosaur Park Formation	Cretaceous (Maastrichtian)	North America	Canada: Alberta	Dinosaurs
Joggins Fossil Cliffs		Carboniferous	North America	Canada: Nova Scotia	
John Day Fossil Beds National Monument	John Day Formation	Eocene – Miocene	North America	US: Oregon	Mammals: dogs, cats, oreodonts, saber-toothed cats, horses, camels, and rodents
* Jurassic National Monument in the San Rafael Swell	Morrison Formation	Jurassic	North America	US: Utah	Non- Avian Dinosaurs and other vertebrates
Clarno Unit, John Day Fossil Beds National Monument	Clarno Formation	Eocene	North America	US: Oregon	Plants: tropical and subtropical nuts, fruits, roots, branches, and seeds
Zion National Park; Capitol Reef National Park; Canyonlands National Park	Kayenta Formation (Glen Canyon Group)	Jurassic	North America	US: Arizona, Colorado, Nevada, and Utah	Non- Avian Dinosaurs and other vertebrates
Kishenehn	Kishenehn Formation	Mid-Eocene	North America	US: Montana	Insects
Klondike Mountain near Republic, Washington	Klondike Mountain Formation	Eocene (Ypresian)	North America	US: Washington	Plants and Insects
Krukowski Quarry		Cambrian	North America	US: Wisconsin	
La Brea Tar Pits		Pleistocene (Rancholabrean)	North America	US: California	
Hadrosaurus Foulkii Leidy Site	Woodbury Formation	Cretaceous	North America	US: New Jersey	Dinosaurs: Hadrosaurus
Franceville basin	Francevillian B Formation	Palaeoproterozoic	Africa	Gabon	Possible earliest evidence for multicellularity in fossil record, known for Francevillian Biota
The Mammoth Site		Pleistocene: Rancholabrean	North America	US: South Dakota	
Manchester Quarry		Triassic	North America	US: Connecticut	
Manuels River		Cambrian	North America	Canada: Newfoundland	Trilobites
McAbee Fossil Beds		Eocene	North America	Canada: British Columbia	Plants, insects, and fish
Melbourne Bone Bed		Pleistocene	North America	US: Florida	Megafauna, Hominin (the "Melbourne Man")
Miguasha National Park		Devonian (Famennian)	North America	Canada: Québec	
Mistaken Point	Mistaken Point Formation	Ediacaran	North America	Canada	Ediacara biota (early multicellular life)
Como Bluff	Morrison Formation	Late Jurassic	North America	Canada/United States (Great Plains)	
Edson Quarry	Ogallala Formation	Miocene/Pliocene	North America	US: Kansas	
Lake Meredith National Recreation Area; Alibates Flint Quarries National Monument	Ogallala Formation	Miocene/Pliocene	North America	US: Texas	
Champlain Bridge (Ottawa), Quebec side	Pamelia Formation	Late Ordovician	North America	Canada: Quebec, Gatineau, Aylmer	
Pipe Creek Sinkhole		Pliocene	North America	US: Indiana	
Minnehaha Park	Platteville Limestone	Ordovician	North America	US: Minnesota	
Minneapolis–Saint Paul (Mississippi River bluffs)	Platteville Limestone	Ordovician	North America	US: Minnesota	
Burgoon Run in Blair County, Pennsylvania	Pocono Formation	Carboniferous (Mississippian)	North America	US: Maryland, Pennsylvania, West Virginia	
Lee Creek Mine	Pungo River Formation	Miocene	North America	US: North Carolina	
Purgatoire River track site		Late Jurassic	North America	US: Colorado	Dinosaurs: Footprints
John Day Fossil Beds National Monument	Rattlesnake Formation	Miocene (Tortonian-Messinian)	North America	US: Oregon	
Red Gulch Dinosaur Tracksite	Sundance Formation	Middle Jurassic	North America	US: Wyoming	Dinosaurs: Footprints
Rincón Colorado		Cretaceous	North America	Mexico: Coahuila	
Walcott-Rust quarry	Rust Formation	Late Ordovician	North America	US: New York	
Schoonmaker Reef and Soldiers' Home Reef		Silurian	North America	US: Wisconsin	Reefs (the first discovered in North America)
Como Bluff	Sundance Formation	Late Jurassic	North America	US: Wyoming	
Path 15 bone bed, San Joaquin Valley	Temblor Formation	Oligocene - Miocene	North America	California	
	Tepetate Formation	Cretaceous – Middle Eocene	North America	Mexico	
Wichita Falls	Texas Red Beds	Permian	North America	US: Texas	Tetrapods
Thomas Farm Site		Miocene	North America	US: Florida	
Edelman Fossil Park	Hornerstown Formation	Cretaceous–Paleogene	North America	US: New Jersey	Mosasaurs, sea turtles, crocodiles, sharks and other marine fossils from the Cretaceous–Paleogene extinction event boundary
Wannagan Creek site, Theodore Roosevelt National Park	Tongue River Formation (= Bullion Creek Fm.)	Paleocene: Tiffanian	North America	US: North Dakota	Mammals, reptiles, birds
Egg Mountain site	Two Medicine Formation	Cretaceous (Campanian)	North America	US: Montana	Dinosaurs, particularly eggs and young
Wheeler Amphitheater in Millard County, Utah	Wheeler Shale	Cambrian	North America	US: Utah	Trilobites
Woodbine, Texas; Arlington Archosaur Site	Woodbine Formation	Cretaceous (Cenomanian)	North America	US: Texas	Dinosaurs and crocodilians
Ziegler Reservoir fossil site ('Snowmastodon Site')		Pleistocene (Illinoian (stage))	North America	US: Colorado	Mastodon and other ice age vertebrates
Zion National Park	Navajo Sandstone	Triassic – Jurassic	North America	US: Utah	?
Agate Fossil Beds National Monument	Arikaree Group: Gering Formation; Monroe Creek formation; Harrison Formation	Miocene	North America	US: Nebraska	
Potomac River	Aquia Formation	Paleocene	North America	US: Maryland and Virginia	
	Arkona Shale	Devonian	North America	Canada: Ontario	
Waco Mammoth National Monument		Pleistocene	North America	US: Texas	
Tanis	Hell Creek Formation	End of Cretaceous/start of Cenozoic (65.76 Ma ± 0.15 Mya)	North America	United States	Apparent Lagerstätte and killing field capturing the first minutes and hours after the Chicxulub impactor and initiation of the KPg extinction event
	Anjar Formation	Maastrichtian	Asia	India	Dinosaur eggs
	Balabansai Formation	Late Jurassic	Asia	Kazakhstan	Dinosaurs
	Barun Goyot Formation	Late Cretaceous	Asia	Mongolia	Dinosaurs, birds and mammals
	Bayan Shireh Formation	Late Cretaceous	Asia	Mongolia	
	Baynunah Formation	Late Miocene	Asia	United Arab Emirates	
Bes-Konak		Oligocene to Pliocene	Asia	Turkey	Insects, Pliocene Plants
	Bissekty Formation	Cretaceous	Asia	Uzbekistan	
	Bostobynskaya Formation (= Bostobe Formation)	Late Cretaceous (Turonian–Campanian)	Asia	Kazakhstan	Dinosaurs
Bugti Hills		Oligocene	Asia	Pakistan	Mammals (Haplorhini)
	Chaomidianzi Formation	Early Cretaceous (Barremian-Aptian)	Asia	China	
	Dabeigou Formation	Cretaceous	Asia	China	
	Rizal, Kalinga	Pleistocene	Asia	Philippines	Hominin
Callao Cave, Cagayan Valley		Pleistocene	Asia	Philippines	Hominin
Denisova Cave			Asia	Russia	Hominin
Tabon Cave, Palawan		Pleistocene	Asia	Philippines	Hominin
	Dainichi Formation	Late Pliocene	Asia	Japan	
	Shaximiao Formation	Middle Jurassic	Asia	China	Dinosaurs
	Dashuigou Formation	Early Cretaceous	Asia	China	Dinosaurs
Flaming Cliffs	Djadochta Formation	Late Cretaceous	Asia	Mongolia	Dinosaurs, eggs
	Dumugol Formation	Early Ordovician	Asia	Korea	
	Ejinhoro Formation	Early Cretaceous	Asia	China	Dinosaurs
	Es Skhul	Pliocene	Asia	Israel: Mount Carmel	Hominin
	Fangou Formation	Paleocene	Asia	China	
	Sannine Formation	Cretaceous	Asia	Lebanon	
	Huadian Formation	Eocene	Asia	China	
	Indricotherium Formation	Oligocene	Asia	Kazakhstan	
	Irdin Manha Formation	Eocene	Asia	Mongolia	
	Iren Dabasu Formation	Late Cretaceous	Asia	China	Dinosaurs
	Iwaki Formation	Early Oligocene	Asia	Japan	
	Jindong Formation	Cretaceous	Asia	Korea	
	Jiufotang Formation	Early Cretaceous	Asia	China	Feathered dinosaurs, birds, pterosaurs
Kampong Trach cave		Miocene	Asia	Cambodia	
	Khukhtek Formation	Early Cretaceous	Asia	Mongolia	Dinosaurs
Balasinor (Raiyoli)			Asia	India	Dinosaurs
Deh-e Alireza, Kerman (fa)		Jurassic	Asia	Iran	Dinosaur footprints, fish
	Kishima Group: Daimyoji Formation; Funazu Formation; Itanoura Formation; Kakinoura Formation; Kishima Formation; Magome Formation; Matsushima Formation; Okinoshima Formation; Oshima Formation	Late Eocene/Early Oligocene	Asia	Japan	
Kitadani Quarry	Kitadani Formation	Early Cretaceous	Asia	Japan	
	Kızılırmak Formation	Tortonian	Asia	Turkey: Evren, Ankara	
	Kota Formation	Early Jurassic	Asia	India	
Tategahana, Lake Nojiri		Pleistocene (Paleolithic)	Asia	Japan	Paleolithic artifacts
	Lameta Formation	Late Cretaceous	Asia	India	
Lang Trang Caves		Pleistocene	Asia	Vietnam	
Liang Bua Cave		Pleistocene	Asia	Indonesia: Flores	Hominin
	Lufeng Formation	Jurassic	Asia	China	
Luoping		Middle Triassic	Asia	China: Yunnan	Very numerous fossils of diverse marine ecosystem
Chengjiang County	Maotianshan Shales	Cambrian	Asia	China	
Li Mae Long		Miocene	Asia	Thailand	Mammals
Minatogawa Limestone Quarry		Neogene	Asia	Japan	Hominin
	Nagura Formation	Middle Miocene	Asia	Japan	
Mandla Plant Fossils National Park		Late Jurassic-Paleogene	Asia	India	plants
	Maleri Formation (Upper and Lower)	Late Triassic	Asia	India	
	Minhe Formation	Late Cretaceous	Asia	China	Dinosaurs
	Nemegt Formation	Late Cretaceous	Asia	Mongolia	Dinosaur fossil, Riverine animals: fish, turtles, crocodilians, birds
Ngandong (Bengawan Solo River)		Pleistocene	Asia	Indonesia: Java	Hominin: Solo Man
	Oi Formation	Early Miocene	Asia	Japan	
Qafzeh cave		Pliocene	Asia	Israel: Nazareth	Hominin
Sambungmacan		Pleistocene	Asia	Indonesia	
Sangiran		Pleistocene	Asia	Indonesia	Hominin
Shivalik Fossil Park	Siwaliks formations	Pleistocene	Asia	India	
	Sao Khua Formation	Early Cretaceous	Asia	Thailand	Dinosaurs
	Shishugou Formation	Late Jurassic	Asia	China	Dinosaurs
Tabun Cave		Pliocene	Asia	Israel: Mount Carmel	Hominin
Tham Khuyen cave		Jurassic	Asia	Vietnam	
	Tiaojishan Formation	Middle Jurassic	Asia	China	Plants, with dinosaurs, pterosaurs, and insects
Trinil		Pleistocene	Asia	Indonesia: Java	Hominin, "Java Man"
	Tuchengzi Formation	Jurassic - Early Cretaceous	Asia	China	
	Tugulu Group	Early Cretaceous	Asia	China	
	Udurchukan Formation	Late Cretaceous (Maastrichtian?)	Asia	Russia	Dinosaurs
	Uhangri Formation	Late Cretaceous	Asia	Korea	Pterosaur tracks
	Wucaiwan member, Shishugou Formation	Middle Jurassic	Asia	China	Dinosaurs
	Xiagou Formation	Cretaceous	Asia	China	
	Xinminbao Group: Chijinbao Formation; Digou Formation; Zhonggou Formation	Early Cretaceous	Asia	China	
	Xiushan Formation	Early Silurian (Llandovery)	Asia	China: Guizhou	
	Yamaga Formation	Late Oligocene	Asia	Japan	
	Yixian Formation	Early Cretaceous	Asia	China	Jehol Biota, See also: Paleobiota of the Yixian Formation
	Yuliangze Formation	Late Cretaceous	Asia	China	Dinosaurs and other vertebrates
	Yushima Formation (= Tatsunokuchi Formation)	Early Pliocene	Asia	Japan	
Baissa	Zaza Formation	Early Cretaceous	Asia	Russia	Insects: Pterygota
	Zhongming Formation	Devonian	Asia	China	
Zhoukoudian		Pleistocene	Asia	China	Hominin, "Peking Man"
Shanwang National Geological Park	Shanwang Formation	Miocene	Asia	China: Shandong	Exceptional preservation of external body features such as skin, hair, scales and feathers
Aetokremnos		Holocene (Mesolithic)	Europe	Cyprus	
Monte San Giorgio		Triassic	Europe	Switzerland and Italy	
Aix-en-Provence		Oligocene	Europe	France	Insects, fishes
Ana	Arcillas de Morella Formation	Late Cretaceous	Europe	Spain	
Atapuerca		Pleistocene (Lower Paleolithic)	Europe	Spain	Hominin
Aust Cliff		Triassic	Europe	England	Insects, Rhaetic bone bed
Batallones		Miocene	Europe	Spain	Carnivora
Bouldner, Isle of Wight	Bembridge Marls, Bouldnor Formation ("Bembridge Insect Bed")	Oligocene	Europe	England	Insects, Leaves
Bois d'Asson		Oligocene	Europe	France	Insects
	Borgloon Formation	Oligocene	Europe	Belgium	
Schmerling Caves		Holocene	Europe	Belgium	hominin, Engis 2 was the first Neanderthal fossil ever found
Buñol		Miocene	Europe	Spain	
	Calizas de La Huérguina Formation	Cretaceous (Barremian)	Europe	Spain	
Dinosaur Quarry of Altamura		Upper Cretaceous	Europe	Italy	Dinosaur footprints (at least four thousand)
Ceprano		Pleistocene	Europe	Italy	Hominin, Homo cepranensis (single find)
Céreste		Oligocene	Europe	France	Insects, fishes
Isernia La Pineta		Pleistocene	Europe	Italy	
Baccinello		Miocene	Europe	Italy	Hominin: Oreopithecus bambolii
Binagadi asphalt lake		Early Pleistocene	Europe	Azerbaijan	Birds, Mammals
	Crevillente	Miocene	Europe	Spain	
Les Eyzies-de-Tayac-Sireuil		Pleistocene	Europe	France	Hominin: Crô-Magnon
Cuevas de los Murciélagos		Pleistocene/Holocene	Europe	Spain: La Palma, Canary Islands	
Dmanisi		Pleistocene	Europe	Georgia	Hominin (Homo erectus georgicus), stone tools
Dob's Linn		Ordovician-Silurian boundary	Europe	Scotland	Graptolites
Dorkovo		Early Pliocene	Europe	Bulgaria	Mastodon
Enspel		Oligocene	Europe	Germany	Insects, mammals
Es Pouás		Pleistocene/Holocene	Europe	Spain: Ibiza (Balearic Islands)	
Fossil Grove	Limestone Coal Formation (Clackmannan Group)	Carboniferous (Serpukhovian)	Europe	Scotland: Glasgow	Plants
	Fur Formation	Early Eocene	Europe	Denmark	
	Gram Formation	Middle-Late Miocene	Europe	Denmark	
	Gauja Formation	Middle Devonian	Europe	Estonia and Latvia	
Gargano		Late Miocene-Early Pliocene	Europe	Italy	Mammals, birds
Geisel valley		Eocene	Europe	Germany	
Gilwern Hill		Ordovician	Europe	Wales	
Gotland		Silurian	Europe	Sweden	
Grès à Reptiles		Cretaceous	Europe	France	Dinosaurs
Guimarota		Late Jurassic	Europe	Portugal	Dinosaurs and mammals
	Hampstead Formation	Oligocene	Europe	England	
Hațeg		Late Cretaceous	Europe	Romania	
Hrútagíl	Mókollsdalur formation	Miocene	Europe	Iceland	Insects
	Hunsrück Slates	Devonian	Europe	Germany: Bundenbach	
Jurassic Coast		Triassic, Jurassic and Cretaceous	Europe	England	Ammonites and reptiles
	Kattendijk Sands	Pliocene	Europe	Belgium	Auk (birds)
Kleinkems		Oligocene	Europe	Germany	Insects
Kostolac-Viminacium		Pleistocene	Europe	Serbia	
Kozarnika		Pleistocene (Lower Paleolithic)	Europe	Bulgaria	Hominin: Early human symbolic behavior
Hušnjak hill (Krapina)		Pleistocene	Europe	Croatia	
La Chapelle-aux-Saints		Pleistocene	Europe	France	Hominin: Neanderthal burial
La Ferrassie		Pleistocene	Europe	France	Hominin
La Roma		Miocene	Europe	Spain	
Las Hoyas		Cretaceous	Europe	Spain	Dinosaurs
	Liedena Sandstone	Late Eocene (Priabonian)	Europe	Spain: Navarra	
Lo Hueco		Cretaceous	Europe	Spain	
	London Clay	Eocene	Europe	England	
	Löwenstein Formation	Late Triassic	Europe	Germany	Dinosaurs
	Lourinhã Formation: Amoreira-Porto Novo Members; Sobral Unit	Late Jurassic	Europe	Portugal	
Lyme Regis		Jurassic	Europe	England: Dorset	Jurassic Coast
	Maastricht Formation	Cretaceous - Paleogene	Europe	Benelux	Dinosaurs
Maltravieso Cave		Pleistocene	Europe	Spain	
Mauer		Pleistocene	Europe	Germany	Hominin
Messel Pit	Messel Oil Shale	Eocene	Europe	Germany	Geiseltalian flora and fauna
Monte Bolca		Eocene	Europe	Italy	
Murero		Cambrian	Europe	Spain	
Neandertal (e.g., Kleine Feldhofer Grotte)		Pleistocene	Europe	Germany	Hominin
Öhningen		Miocene	Europe	Germany	Insects, fishes
	Oxford Clay	Jurassic	Europe	England	Fish and invertebrates
Paris Basin (Argille Plastique)		Early Eocene	Europe	France	
Pobiti Kamani		Mesozoic	Europe	Bulgaria	
Pontnewydd Cave		Pleistocene (Paleolithic)	Europe	Wales	Hominin: Neanderthals
Quercy Phosphorites		Eocene/Oligocene	Europe	France	
Radoboj		Miocene	Europe	Croatia	Insects
Repedea Hill Fossil Site		Neogene	Europe	Romania	
Cozla Fossil Site		Oligocene	Europe	Romania	
Pietricica Fossil Site		Oligocene	Europe	Romania	
Cernegura Fossil Site		Oligocene	Europe	Romania	
Rhynie, Aberdeenshire	Rhynie Chert	Devonian	Europe	Scotland	Plants, Cyanobacteria, first Hexapoda
Riodeva		Jurassic/Cretaceous	Europe	Spain	Dinosaurs
Rott		Oligocene	Europe	Germany	Insects, fishes
	Sajóvölgyi Formation	Miocene (Serravallian)	Europe	Hungary	
	Sânpetru Formation	Cretaceous (Maastrichtian)	Europe	Romania	
Sandberg (sandstone hill)		Around Jurassic	Europe		
Sansan		Miocene	Europe	France	Hominin: Pliopithecus
Santa Ana Cave		Pleistocene	Europe	Spain	
Sieblos Dysodil		Oligocene	Europe	Germany	
Slieve Anierin		Namurian	Europe	Ireland	Goniatites, and Bivalvia, marine and coastal fauna.
	Solnhofen limestone	Jurassic	Europe	Germany	
Stránská skála	Moravian Karst formation	Pleistocene	Europe	Czech Republic:Moravia	Marine and coastal fauna, fishes, birds, mammals
Trachilos footprints		Miocene	Europe	Greece	Hominin footprints
Turritellenplatte		Miocene (mid-Burdigalian)	Europe	Germany: Baden-Württemberg	Gastropods:sea snail Turritella turris
	Upper Valdarno	Pleistocene (Villafranchian)	Europe	Italy: Tuscany	
	Valkenburg Formation	Cretaceous	Europe	Belgium	
Donetsk		Carboniferous	Europe	Ukraine	Plants
Razdolne		Devonian	Europe	Ukraine	
Venta del Moro		Miocene	Europe	Spain	
Venta Micena		Pliocene	Europe	Spain	
	Wessex Formation	Cretaceous	Europe	England	
Willershausen		Pliocene	Europe	Germany	Insects
Untermassfeld		Early Pleistocene	Europe	Germany	Hominin (controversial)
Alcoota		Miocene	Oceania	Australia: Northern Territory	Marsupials, birds and crocodiles
	Apex Chert	Archaean	Oceania	Australia: Western Australia (Marble Bar)	
Saint Bathans Fauna	Bannockburn Formation	Miocene	Oceania	New Zealand: Otago	
Bluff Downs	Allingham Formation	Pliocene	Oceania	Australia: Queensland	wetland fauna
Bullock Creek	Camfield Fossil Beds	Miocene	Oceania	Australia: Northern Territory	Marsupials
Canowindra-Gooloogong	Mandagery Sandstone	Devonian	Oceania	Australia: New South Wales	
Cape Range National Park		Miocene-Pleistocene	Oceania	Australia: Western Australia	Coral reefs, marine and coastal fauna
Cuddie Springs		Pleistocene	Oceania	Australia: New South Wales	Megafauna/human interaction (bones with stone artifacts)
Curio Bay		Jurassic	Oceania	New Zealand: Southland (The Catlins)	Petrified forest
Denmark Hill Insect Bed	Blackstone Formation	Late Triassic	Oceania	Australia: Ipswich, Queensland	Insects
Dinosaur Cove		Cretaceous	Oceania	Australia: Victoria	Dinosaurs
Dinosaur Dreaming		Cretaceous	Oceania	Australia: Victoria	Mammals
Ditjimanka LF		Oligocene	Oceania	Australia: South Australia	
Ediacara Hills		Ediacaran	Oceania	Australia: South Australia (Flinders Ranges)	Ediacara biota (early multicellular life)
	Emu Bay Shale	Early Cambrian	Oceania	Australia: South Australia (Kangaroo Island)	
	Etadunna Formation	Oligocene/Miocene	Oceania	Australia: South Australia	
Foulden Maar		Early Miocene	Oceania	New Zealand: Otago	
Georgina Basin	Cravens Peak Beds, Dulcie Sandstone	Neoproterozoic – late Paleozoic	Oceania	Australia: Northern Territory, Queensland	
	Gogo Formation	Devonian	Oceania	Australia: Western Australia	
	Goldie Chert	Middle-Late Cambrian	Oceania	Australia: Victoria	
Grenfell fossil site	Hunter Siltstone Formation	Devonian	Oceania	Australia: New South Wales	Fishes
	Greta Siltstone Formation	Late Pliocene	Oceania	New Zealand: Canterbury (Hurunui)	
	Heathcote siltstone	Early Silurian- Late Devonian	Oceania	Australia: Victoria	
Horseshoe Bay Limestone Downs		Cretaceous	Oceania	New Zealand: Waikato	
Kangaroo Wells		Miocene	Oceania	Australia: Northern Territory	
	Knocklofty Formation	Early Triassic	Oceania	Australia: Tasmania	
	Knowsley East Formation	Middle-late Cambrian	Oceania	Australia: Victoria	
Lake Callabonna		Pleistocene	Oceania	Australia: South Australia	Marsupials, birds
Lake Mungo		Pleistocene	Oceania	Australia: New South Wales	Hominin
Lake Ngapakaldi to Lake Palankarinna Fossil Area		Pliocene	Oceania	Australia: South Australia (Tirari Desert)	Variety of vertebrates
Lancefield Swamp		Pleistocene	Oceania	Australia: Victoria	Australian megafauna, mostly Macropus giganteus
Lightning Ridge		Cretaceous	Oceania	Australia: New South Wales	Mammals
Mammoth Cave		Pleistocene?	Oceania	Australia: Western Australia	
	Mampuwordu Sands	Miocene	Oceania	Australia: South Australia	
Murgon fossil site		Eocene	Oceania	Australia: Queensland (south-east)	Mammals (Tingamarra Fauna)
Naracoorte Caves		Pleistocene	Oceania	Australia: South Australia	Australian megafauna, World Heritage List
Pindai Caves		Holocene	Oceania	New Caledonia	Hominin, Birds
Quanbun		Pliocene/Miocene	Oceania	Australia: Western Australia	
Riversleigh		Oligocene/Miocene	Oceania	Australia: Queensland	
Talbragar fossil site		Jurassic	Oceania	Australia: New South Wales (central west)	Plants and fishes
	Tangahoe Formation	Late Pliocene	Oceania	New Zealand: Taranaki	
	Waipara Greensand	Paleogene	Oceania	New Zealand: Canterbury	sharks, some proto-penguins
	Wianamatta Shale and Ashfield Shale	Late Triassic	Oceania	Australia: New South Wales (Sydney)	Prehistoric amphibians (Capitosauridae, Trematosaurinae), ray finned fish (Semionotiformes and Palaeoniscidae), cartilaginous fish (Xenacanthida) and insects (Protorthoptera)
Great Otway National Park		Cretaceous	Oceania	Australia: Victoria	
Otway Basin: Dutton Way – Early Pliocene; Arch site – Middle Miocene; Clifton Banks – Middle to late Miocene; Forsyth's Banks and Fossil rock stack – Early Pliocene; Spring Creek – Late Miocene to Early Pliocene; Kawarren – Late Oligocene; Leigh River – Early Miocene; Hopkins River – Middle to Late Miocene; Gibson Steps – Bairnsdalian (Middle Miocene); Curdie – Balcombian (Middle Miocene); Princetown Beach – Late Oligocene; Castle Cove – Late Oligocene		Late Oligocene – Early Pliocene	Oceania	Australia: Victoria	
Tinguiririca	Abanico Formation	Oligocene (Rupelian)	South America	Chile	Mammals (defines one interval of the South American land mammal age (SALMA))
	Acre Conglomerate	Miocene (Huayquerian)	South America	Brazil	
Agua de la Zorra		Triassic	South America	Argentina	Petrified forest of Charles Darwin
	Allen Formation	Cretaceous (Campanian – Maastrichtian)	South America	Argentina	dinosaurs (including eggs), pterosaurs, and mammals
	Anacleto Formation	Cretaceous (Campanian)	South America	Argentina	Dinosaurs (eggs), mammals, bird footprints
	Andalhualá Formation	Miocene/Pliocene	South America	Argentina	
	Bajo de la Carpa Formation	Cretaceous (Santonian)	South America	Argentina	
	Bahía Inglesa Formation	Middle Miocene-Late Pliocene	South America	Chile	
Bauru Basin	Bauru Group	Cretaceous	South America	Brazil	Dinosaurs
	Camacho Formation	Miocene	South America	Uruguay	Diversity of terrestrial mammals and marine invertebrates
Candeleros Hill, Neuquén Province	Candeleros Formation	Cretaceous (Cenomanian)	South America	Argentina	
	Capadare Formation	Middle Miocene	South America	Venezuela	
Paleorrota	Caturrita Formation	Triassic (Carnian – Norian)	South America	Brazil: Rio Grande do Sul	
Cerrejón	Cerrejón Formation	Middle-Late Paleocene	South America	Colombia	
Cerro Ballena		Plio–Pleistocene	South America	Chile	Cetaceans
	Cerro Bandera Formation	Miocene	South America	Argentina	
Chapadmalal Sea Cliff	Chapadmalalan	Pliocene	South America	Argentina	Mammals, terror birds, paleoburrows
	Deseado Formation	Oligocene	South America	Argentina	
	Ensenada Formation	Pleistocene	South America	Argentina	
	Huincul Formation	Late Cretaceous (Cenomanian)	South America	Argentina	Dinosaurs, including Argentinosaurus huinculensis and Mapusaurus
	Irati Formation	Early Permian (Artinskian)	South America	Brazil	Mesosaurs
Ischigualasto Provincial Park	Ischigualasto Formation	Triassic	South America	Argentina	Tetrapods, early dinosaurs, plants
	Ituzaingó Formation	Late Miocene (Huayquerian)	South America	Argentina	Mammals, birds, reptiles, fish, bivalves, foraminifera, ichnofossils and flora
	Jaguel Formation	Late Cretaceous - Early Paleocene (Maastrichtian – Danian)	South America	Argentina	
Cerro Cuadrado Petrified Forest	La Matilde Formation	Middle to Late Jurassic (Bathonian – Oxfordian)	South America	Argentina	Dinosaurs
Laguna Manantiales Farm	La Matilde Formation	Middle to Late Jurassic (Bathonian – Oxfordian)	South America	Argentina	Dinosaur tracks
	Las Curtiembres Formation	Late Cretaceous (Campanian)	South America	Argentina	
	Lecho Formation	Late Cretaceous (Maastrichtian)	South America	Argentina	Titanosaur Saltasaurus, avian and non-avian theropods
	Lemaire Formation	Late Jurassic	South America	Argentina	
	Leticia Formation	Eocene (Bartonian)	South America	Argentina	
Cerro Lisandro, Neuquén province	Lisandro Formation (= Cerro Lisandro Fm.)	Late Cretaceous (Cenomanian – Turonian)	South America	Argentina	
	Lohan Cura Formation	Early Cretaceous (Aptian – Albian)	South America	Argentina	Mesosaurs; Oldest known amniote embryos
	Mangrullo Formation	Early Permian (Artinskian)	South America	Uruguay	
Mylodon Cave		Pleistocene	South America	Chile	
	Olmedo Formation	Paleocene	South America	Argentina	
	Quiriquina Formation	Cretaceous	South America	Chile	
	Paja Formation	Cretaceous	South America	Colombia	
Licán Ray	Panguipulli Formation	Triassic	South America	Chile	Plants
Punta Peters (5 km east of Panguipulli)	Panguipulli Formation	Triassic	South America	Chile	Plants
Patagonia Molasses		Miocene	South America	Argentina	
Pilauco Bajo		Late Pleistocene	South America	Chile	Megafauna, human activity
	Pinturas Formation	Miocene (Burdigalian – Langhian)[verification needed]	South America	Argentina	
	Pisco Formation	Late[verification needed] Miocene/Early Pliocene	South America	Peru	
	Plottier Formation	Late Cretaceous (Coniacian – ?Santonian)	South America	Argentina	Dinosaurs, Trace fossils
	Portezuelo Formation	Late Cretaceous (Turonian – Coniacian)	South America	Argentina	Dinosaurs, turtles, and other animals
	Puerto Madryn Formation	Late Miocene	South America	Argentina	
	Punta Cactus Formation	Eocene	South America	Argentina	
Auca Mahuevo	Río Colorado Subgroup	Cretaceous	South America	Argentina	Dinosaurs
	Roca Formation	Cretaceous - Paleocene	South America	Argentina	Marine invertebrates
	San Julián Formation	Eocene/Oligocene	South America	Argentina	
	Santa Cruz Formation	Miocene	South America	Argentina	
	Santana Group (Crato Formation)	Aptian-Albian	South America	Brazil	Insects, Fish, Pterosaurs
Paleorrota	Santa Maria Formation	Middle–Late Triassic (Ladinian-Carnian)	South America	Brazil: Rio Grande do Sul	Early dinosaurs
Cuesta Santo Domingo	Santo Domingo Formation	Miocene	South America	Chile	
Sâo José de Itaboraí basin	Itaboraí Formation	Paleocene (Itaboraian)	South America	Brazil	
	Sloggett Formation (= Bahía Sloggett Formation)	Late Eocene/Early Oligocene	South America	Argentina	
	Solimões Formation	Late Miocene/Early Pliocene[verification needed]	South America	Brazil	
	Tanohata Formation	Early Cretaceous (Aptian)	Asia	Japan	
Toca da Boa Vista Cave		Pleistocene	South America	Brazil	
	Touro Passo Formation	Late Pleistocene–Holocene	South America	Brazil: Rio Grande do Sul	
Tralcán	Tralcán Formation	Triassic	South America	Chile	
	Tunal Formation	Paleocene	South America	Argentina	
Urumaco	Urumaco Formation	Miocene	South America	Venezuela	
La Venta	Honda Group	Middle Miocene	South America	Colombia	
	Yacoraite Formation	Late Cretaceous/Early Paleocene (Maastrichtian – Danian)	South America	Argentina	Dinosaur tracks; Stromatolites
	Yahgan Formation	Early Cretaceous	South America	Argentina	
Sahel Alma		Late Cretaceous (Santonian)	Asia	Lebanon	Fish, Arthropods, Molluscs
White Springs Local Fauna	Parachucla Formation	late Oligocene	North America	United States: Florida	nearshore marine and terrestrial vertebrates
Pindaï Peninsula	Népoui Formation	Late Miocene	Oceania	New Caledonia	Fossil flora
Mount Dunfee	Deep Spring Formation	Ediacaran-Cambrian	North America	United States: Nevada	
Syuzma and Onega Rivers	Ustʹ Pinega Formation	Ediacaran	Europe	Russia: Arkhangelsk Oblast	
Victoria Island	Wynniatt Formation	Tonian	North America	Canada: Nunavut	

== See also ==
- Dawn of Humanity (2015 PBS film) – 2015 American documentary film
- Fossil collecting – Collecting fossils to study, collect or sell
- Fossil park
- Jurassic Coast – World Heritage Site on the coast of southern England
- Lagerstätte – Sedimentary deposit with well-preserved extraordinary fossils
- Lists of dinosaur-bearing stratigraphic units
- List of fossil parks around the world
- List of fossil parks in India
- Pleistocene fossils in Michigan
- List of human evolution fossils
- Malapa Fossil Site, Cradle of Humankind – Cave in Gauteng, South Africa
- Mary Anning – English fossil collector and palaeontologist (1799–1847)
- Paleobiology – Study of organic evolution using fossils
- Paleontology – Study of past life through fossils
- Amateur geology, also known as Rockhounding – Non-professional study and collecting of rocks and minerals
