= MOTH locality =

Devonian fossil locality in Canada

MOTH
- Geologic site
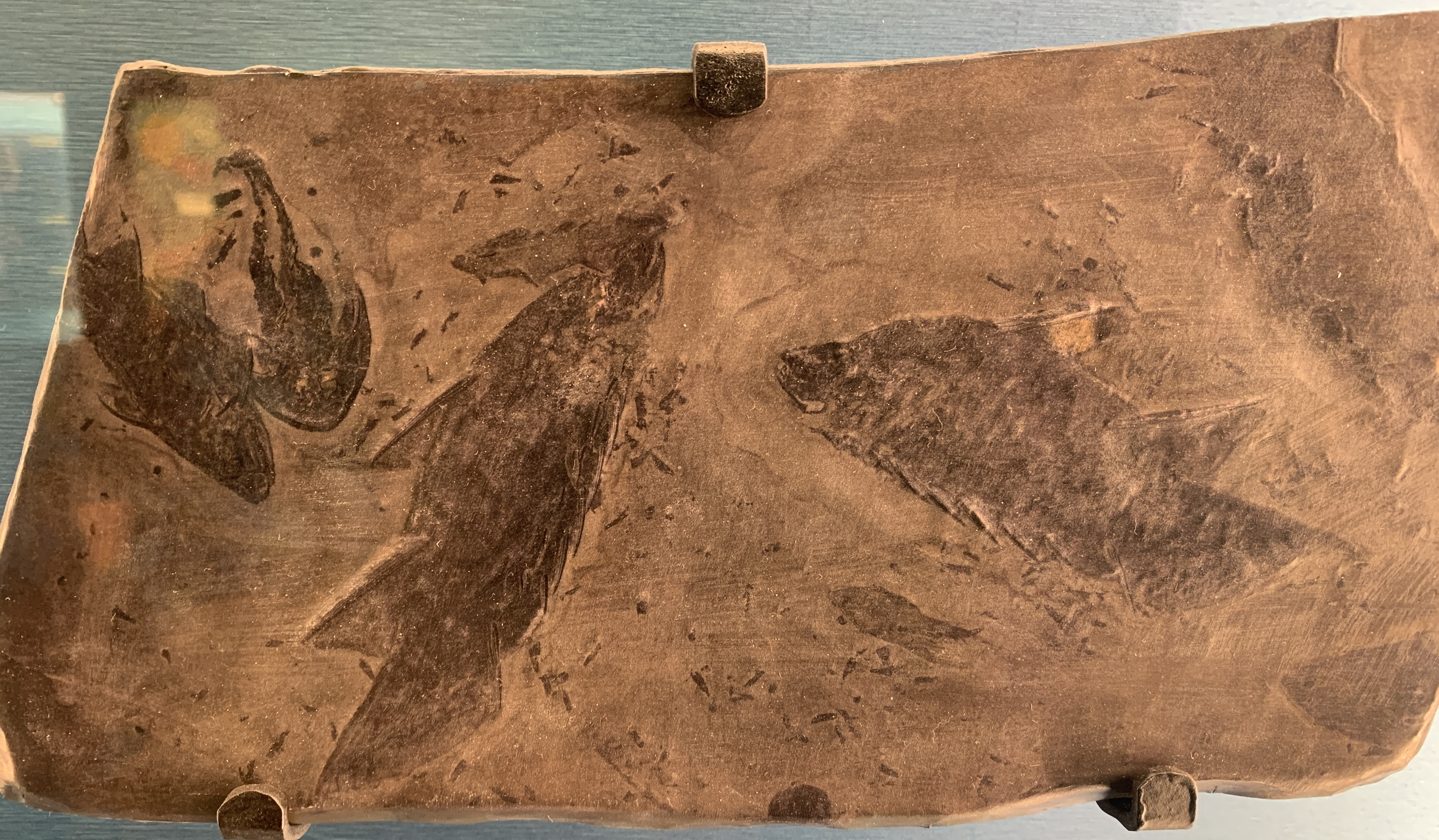
- A cast of the "Wonder Block", a rock slab from MOTH with 7 different species (8 fish in total) in one place: an unnamed ischnacanthid (center left), an unnamed osteostracan (top left), Brochoadmones (two largest fish near the center), Lupopsyrus (above the left Brochoadmones), Drepanolepis (bottom center), Obtusacanthus (top right), Furcacauda (bottom right)

- Location within Canada
- Coordinates: 62.55°N 127.75°W
- Location: Northwest Territories, Canada
- Age: Lochkovian (Early Devonian)

The Man-on-the-hill (MOTH) locality is a fossil site in the Northwest Territories of Canada renowned for its incredibly well-preserved Early Devonian fish fossils. Discovered in the Mackenzie Mountains in the 1960s, MOTH accumulated greater prestige in the late 20th century, with many fossil fish species only known from this one site. The fauna consists of both jawed fish (mostly acanthodians, the "spiny sharks") and jawless fish (armored osteostracans and pteraspidomorphs, as well as distinctive fork-tailed furcacaudiform thelodonts). The geology of MOTH reconstructs the area as a calm marine environment with mixed sediment sources along the western coast of Laurussia.

== History ==
In the mid-1960s, geological mappers from the Geological Survey of Canada (GSC) discovered well-preserved fish fossils on a steep mountainside in the Mackenzie Mountains, about 70 km (43 mi) northeast from the mining town of Tungsten, Northwest Territories. At the time, the site was known as GSC locality 69014. By the late 1970s, it had gained renown among Canadian paleoichthyologists, initiating a long list of new species discovered at the site.

The University of Alberta Laboratory for Vertebrate Paleontology (UALVP), which catalogues the site as UALVP locality 129, handled most subsequent collecting efforts. UA paleontologists Brian D.E. Chatterton and Mark V.H. Wilson led expeditions in 1983, 1990, 1996, 1998, and 2013, greatly increasing the volume of fossils recovered from the site. A nearby rock landmark, resembling a man sitting on the ridge, inspired a persistent nickname for the site: Man-on-the-hill (MOTH). The main fossiliferous section of MOTH is an Early Devonian horizon at the level of 180 meters, and fossils are also found on the talus slope of the mountainside. Though MOTH is the most productive fish site in the Mackenzie Mountains, it is not alone: well-preserved Silurian fish are also known from lower layers of the site (known as B-MOTH), strata in the vicinity of Avalanche Lake, and elsewhere in the range.

== Geology ==
MOTH corresponds to a transitional zone between the clastic shales of the Road River Formation and the shelf carbonates of the Delorme Group. An earliest Devonian (Lochkovian) age is established by its fossil fauna, with distinctive Lochkovian fish such as Waengsjoeaspis, Canadapteraspis, Romundina, Altholepis, Polymerolepis, and Seretolepis. Brachiopod and conodont fossils also agree with this age estimate. At the time, the area would have been the tropical western continental shelf of Laurussia, fractured into many smaller basins and platforms by rifting along the Cordilleran front.

The vertebrate-bearing layers of MOTH are mainly composed of finely layered light grey argillaceous (clay-rich) limestone and dark grey silty calcareous shale. Fine grains of dolomite, calcite, and quartz are the predominant minerals in the sediment, reflecting a mixture of carbonate and siliciclastic inputs, including sharp grains sourced from airborne dust. The layers are flat-lying and undisturbed apart from subtle bioturbation, indicating perpetually calm waters. Older studies advocated for a shallow-water (tide pool or lagoon) environment, based on the assumption that its fish and invertebrates preferred coastal or freshwater habitats. A 2005 overview instead supported a more offshore environment, below storm wave base. In any case, the presence of pyrite indicates that bottom waters were anoxic (oxygen-deprived), allowing for high-fidelity fossil preservation. The exact cause of death is unknown for the fauna, as there is no evidence for turbidites (underwater mudslides) or seasonal water column disruptions. MOTH can be considered a lagerstätte.

== Paleobiota ==
More than 72 vertebrate species are known from MOTH as of 2015, though only around half have been formally named and described.

=== Acanthodii ===
A few fully articulated ischnacanthiform fossils cannot be assigned to a specific species, as their diagnostic teeth are obscured by scales. Various MOTH ischnacanthid fossils have been referred to Ischnacanthus gracilis, though later studies refuted these claims. A 2001 UA biology dissertation by Gavin Hanke provides many new species names for MOTH specimens, but some of these names are yet to be published in a peer-reviewed journal.

Acanthodians ("spiny sharks") and acanthodian-like fish of MOTH
Genus	Species	Notes	Images
Altholepis	A. spp.	Three new species from MOTH have scales resembling Altholepis, though these species have yet to be formally named and described.	
Brochoadmones	B. milesi	A deep-bodied acanthodian with many small spiny "finlets" on its underside.	
Cassidiceps	C. vermiculatus	A deep-bodied acanthodian with a head covered in thick densely-textured scales.	
Erymnacanthus	E. clivus	An ischnacanthid with small teeth and deep jaws.	
Euryacanthus	E. rugosus	An ischnacanthid with large, robust teeth.	
Gladiobranchus	G. probaton	A toothless gladiobranchid diplacanthiform. Potentially a junior synonym of Uraniacanthus spinosus, an English acanthodian which is exceedingly similar to Gladiobranchus.	
Kathemacanthus	K. rosulentus	A deep-bodied acanthodian with a "necklace" of artichoke-shaped scales similar to more typical chondrichthyans.	
Lupopsyroides	L. macracanthus	A toothless fish with simple scales and no apparent bony skeleton apart from fin spines.	
Lupopsyrus	L. pygmaeus	An enigmatic acanthodian with simple scales and two rows of large keeled scutes on each side of its body.	
Nostolepis	N. striata	A weathered specimen with Nostolepis-type scales, yet to be formally described. The specimen may be referable to Nostovicina laticristata.	
Obtusacanthus	O. corroconis	An acanthodian-like fish with enlarged needle-like lip scales and no true teeth.	
Paucicanthus	P. vanelsti	A narrow-bodied acanthodian lacking spines on its pectoral and pelvic fins.	
Polymerolepis	P. whitei	An enigmatic fish with "bradyodont"-like scales. Fossils from MOTH show that it had an anal fin spine, like acanthodians.	
Promesacanthus	P. eppleri	A mesacanthid acanthodiform which retains small prepectoral spines, akin to "climatiiform" acanthodians.	
Seretolepis	S. elegans	A chondrichthyan-like fish closely related to Kathemacanthus.	
Tetanopsyrus	T. breviacanthias	A stocky diplacanthiform with broad crushing plates instead of teeth. This species has relatively short pectoral spines.	
Tetanopsyrus	T. lindoei	A stocky diplacanthiform with broad crushing plates instead of teeth. This species has relatively long pectoral spines.	
Tricuspicanthus	T. gannitus	A common but small ischnacanthid with three rows of teeth.	
Tricuspicanthus	T. pisciculus	A tiny ischnacanthid with two rows of teeth.	

=== Placoderms ===
Placoderms of MOTH
Genus	Species	Notes	Images
Romundina	R. stellina	An acanthothoracid placoderm. A single skull found at MOTH in 1990 has yet to be fully described.	

=== Osteostraci ===
A 2011 UA biology thesis by Bradley Scott provides several new species names for MOTH osteostracan specimens, but some of these names are yet to be published in a peer-reviewed journal.

Osteostracans of MOTH
Genus	Species	Notes	Images
Dentapelta	D. loefflerae	A superciliaspidid zenaspid with tooth-like denticles on its headshield.	
"Diademaspis"	"D." mackenziensis	A small zenaspid which is probably not a species of Diademaspis.	
Glabrapelta	G. cristata	A superciliaspidid zenaspid with a smooth headshield.	
Glabrapelta	G. minima	A small superciliaspidid zenaspid with a smooth headshield.	
Machairaspis	M. serrata	A small scolenaspidine zenaspidid with a tall serrated spine in the middle of its headshield.	
Superciliaspis	S. gabrielsei	A superciliaspidid zenaspid with prominent spines on its headshield. Previously considered a species of Cephalaspis.	
Waengsjoeaspis	W. nahanniensis	An osteostracan related to Benneviaspidida.	
Waengsjoeaspis	W. platycornis	An osteostracan related to Benneviaspidida.	

=== Thelodonti ===
All of the thelodonts present at MOTH belong to the order Furcacaudiformes, a group characterized by small heads, humpbacked bodies which are deep and laterally flattened, and equally deep fork-shaped tails.

Thelodonts of MOTH
Genus	Species	Notes	Images
Cometicercus	C. talimaaae	A small, rare, and relatively slender furcacaudid furcacaudiform.	
Drepanolepis	D. maerssae	A tiny drepanolepidid furcacaudiform with sickle-shaped scales.	
Furcacauda	F. fredholmae	A medium-sized furcacaudid furcacaudiform with a pronounced dorsal fin.	
Furcacauda	F. heintzae	A medium-sized furcacaudid furcacaudiform with a pronounced dorsal fin. Previously considered a species of Sigurdia.	
Sphenonectris	S. turnerae	A relatively large furcacaudid furcacaudiform without a dorsal fin.	

=== Pteraspidomorphi ===
A 2004 UA biology thesis by Jeffrey Greeniaus provides several new species names for MOTH pteraspidomorph specimens, but these names are yet to be published in a peer-reviewed journal.

Pteraspidomorphs of MOTH
Genus	Species	Notes	Images
Aserotaspis	A. canadensis	A tesselate heterostracan with many small armor plates, each bearing a mesh of irregular ridges.	
Canadapteraspis	C. alocostomata	A medium-sized pteraspidiform.	
Dinaspidella	D. elizabethae	A common medium-sized irregulareaspidine cyathaspidid.	
Lepidaspis	L. serrata	A tesselate heterostracan with many small armor plates, each bearing a single serrated ridge.	
Nahanniaspis	N. mackenziei	A common small irregulareaspidine cyathaspidid.	
Pionaspis	P. amplissima	A rare relatively large cyathaspidid.	
Poraspis	P. polaris	A medium-sized poraspidine cyathaspidid.	

=== Other fossils ===
Conodonts are found at MOTH, including the Silurian-Pragian index fossil Ozarkodina remscheidensis. The most abundant invertebrates at MOTH are leperditiid ostracods which cluster together in mass death assemblages, sometimes around vertebrate remains. Various brachiopods can also be found at the site. Eurypterids are rare but well-preserved. Conulariids and phyllocarids have also been reported. Tiny fragments of typical shallow marine invertebrates (crinoids, brachiopods, bryozoans, corals) make up a minor component of the sediment.
