= Kishima =

Kishima refer

- Kishima District, Saga
- Kishima Kouma
- Kishima Group

== See also ==
- Kashimashi: Girl Meets Girl
- Kashima District (disambiguation)
