= Canonia =

Scientific classification
- Kingdom: Animalia
- Phylum: Chordata
- Infraphylum: Agnatha
- Class: †Thelodonti
- Order: †Furcacaudiformes
- Family: †Furcacaudidae
- Genus: †Canonia; Vieth, 1980

Type species
- †Canonia grossi Vieth, 1980

Species
- †Canonia costulata; †Canonia grossi

Extinct genus of jawless fish

Canonia is an extinct genus of jawless fish found in Canada. There are two species in this genus, C. grossi and C. costulata. The C.grossi species is thought to be from the Devonian Period (Early Lochkovian). Fossils of C.grossi have been found in the Boothia Peninsula. Isolated scales of Canonia are streamlined to minimize drag, similar to modern sharks capable of strong swimming in open waters.

== See also ==
- List of prehistoric jawless fish genera
- List of thelodont genera
