= Tarab Formation =

Geologic formation in the Wadi al Shatii District, western Libya

- Stratigraphic range: Rupelian; ~33–28.4 Ma
- Type: Formation

Lithology
- Primary: Limestone

Location
- Coordinates: 28.2°N 13.9°E
- Approximate paleocoordinates: 25.4°N 11.0°E
- Region: Wadi al Shatii District
- Country: Libya
- Extent: Libyan Desert
- Tarab Formation (Libya)

The Tarab Formation is a geologic formation in the Wadi al Shatii District, western Libya. The lacustrine limestones preserve fossils dating back to the Rupelian stage of the Oligocene period.

== Fossil content ==
The formation has provided the following fossils:

Mammals

- Pliohyracidae
  - Saghatherium antiquum

Amphibians

- Anura indet.

Fish

- Osteichthyes indet.

== See also ==
- Mizdah Formation, Late Cretaceous fossiliferous formation of Libya
- Jebel Qatrani Formation, contemporaneous fossiliferous formation of Egypt
- Quercy Phosphorites Formation, contemporaneous fossiliferous formation of France
- Indricotherium Formation, contemporaneous fossiliferous formation of Kazakhstan
