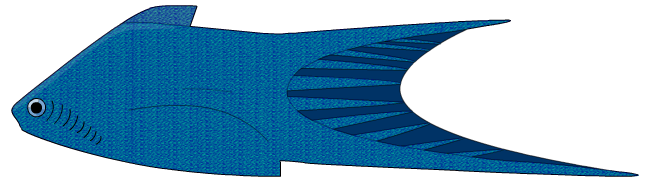
- An artists concept of Cometicercus

Scientific classification
- Kingdom: Animalia
- Phylum: Chordata
- Infraphylum: Agnatha
- Class: †Thelodonti
- Order: †Furcacaudiformes
- Family: †Furcacaudidae
- Genus: †Cometicercus; Wilson & Caldwell, 1998

Type species
- †Cometicercus talimaaae Wilson & Caldwell, 1998

= Cometicercus =

Extinct genus of jawless fishes

Cometicercus is an extinct genus of furcacaudiform thelodont which lived in the Northwest Territories of Canada during the Early Devonian period. It hails from the MOTH locality in the Mackenzie Mountains. It is only known from its caudal fin and parts of its dorsal surface, including its dorsal fin. The scales of Cometicercus likely served an anti-parasite role, similar to modern sharks which form large groups and cruise at slow to medium speeds.
