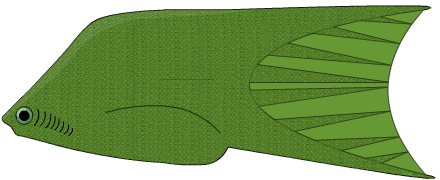
- An artist's concept of Sphenonectris

Scientific classification
- Kingdom: Animalia
- Phylum: Chordata
- Infraphylum: Agnatha
- Class: †Thelodonti
- Order: †Furcacaudiformes
- Family: †Furcacaudidae
- Genus: †Sphenonectris; Wilson & Caldwell, 1998
- Species: †S. turnerae

Binomial name
- †Sphenonectris turnerae Wilson & Caldwell, 1998

= Sphenonectris =

Extinct genus of jawless fishes

Sphenonectris is an extinct genus of furcacaudiform thelodont which lived in the Northwest Territories of Canada during the Early Devonian period. It hails from the MOTH locality in the Mackenzie Mountains.

Though large by furcacaudiform standards, Sphenonectris were small, jawless fish, characterized by their laterally compressed pot-bellied body and forked tail. They possessed a hunched pomacanthid-like body with the only visible fin being the caudal fin. The scales of Sphenonectris likely served an anti-parasite role, similar to modern sharks which form large groups and cruise at slow to medium speeds.

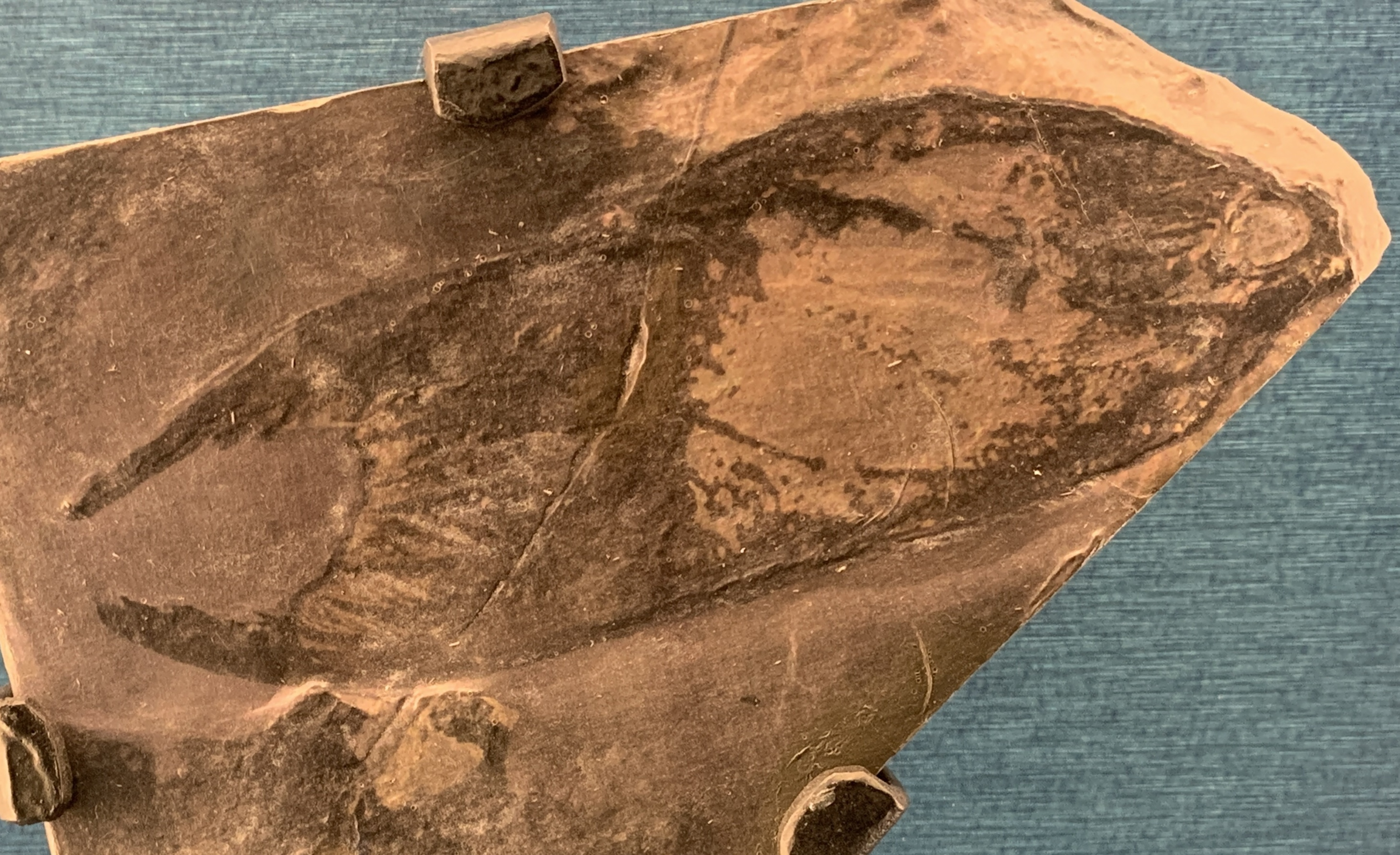
Sphenonectris sp. cast. Mackenzie Mountains, Northwest Territories (Canada). At the Royal Tyrrell Museum of Palaeontology.
