= Nochaco =

Mountain in Chile

- Location within Chile

Highest point
- Elevation: 393 m (1,289 ft)
- Coordinates: 39°44′44.87″S 72°34′26.96″W

Geography
- Location: Chile
- Parent range: Loncoche Massif

Geology
- Rock age: Paleozoic
- Mountain type: Block mountain

Nochaco is a hill in Los Ríos Region, southern Chile. The hill lies in the commune of Los Lagos just north of San Pedro River. Across the river in the south lies the mountain Llecué. The southern slopes are part of an epigenetic valley.
