= Nagura Formation =

Geologic formation in Japan

The Nagura Formation is a palaeontological formation located in Japan. It dates to the Middle Miocene period.

== See also ==
- List of fossil sites
