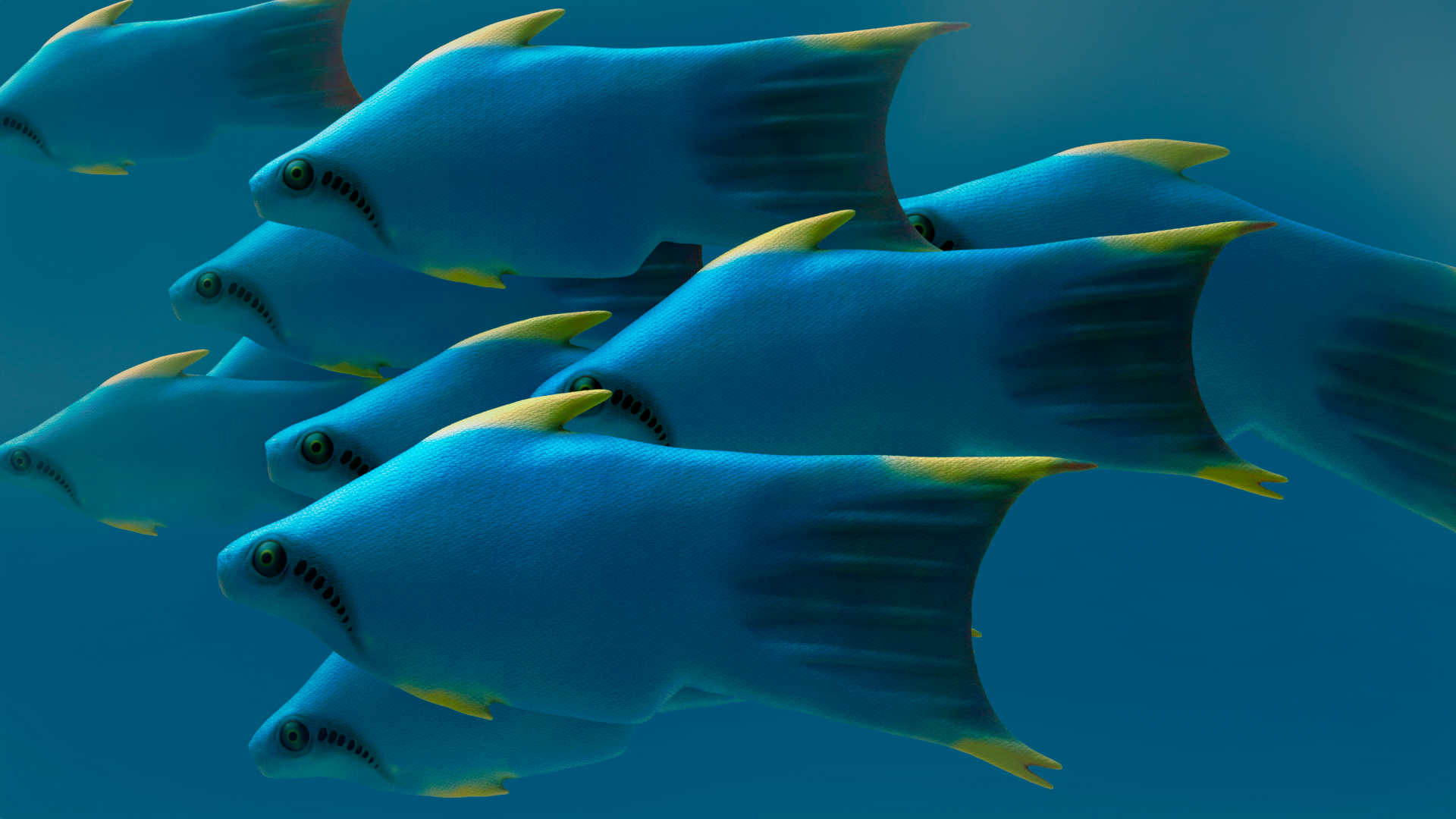
- Furcacauda fredholmae

Scientific classification
- Kingdom: Animalia
- Phylum: Chordata
- Infraphylum: Agnatha
- Class: †Thelodonti
- Order: †Furcacaudiformes
- Family: †Furcacaudidae; Wilson & Caldwell, 1998

Type genus
- †Furcacauda

Genera
- †Canonia; †Cometicercus; †Furcacauda; †Sphenonectris

= Furcacaudidae =

Extinct family of jawless fishes

Furcacaudidae, the "'fork-tailed' agnathans," is an extinct family of thelodontid agnathans from the Lochkovian stage of the Early Devonian epoch and Wenlockian epoch of the Silurian, known from fossils found in Northern Canada. It is the type family of the order Furcacaudiformes, and itself currently includes 6 known species. It was officially described in 1998 by Mark V. H. Wilson and Michael W. Caldwell.

A study in 2009 published by Wilson and Tiiu Märss moved members of Furcacaudiformes (and by extension Furcacaudidae) into a more basal position based on a more up-to-date data matrix, suggesting the divergence of Furcacaudidae from other thelodonts occurred earlier than previously theorized.

== Phylogeny ==
According to Wilson and Märss' 2009 study, Furcacaudidae are more basal members of Furcacaudiformes, having diverged earlier than other members of the order. The following is a portion of the 2009 revised cladogram, demonstrating Furcacaudidae's position in relation to the order Furcacaudiformes.

- Furcacaudiformes
  - Furcacaudidae
    - Canonia
    - - Sphenonectris
      - - Cometicercus
        - Furcacauda
  - Drepanolepidae
    - - Drepanolepis
  - Pezopallichthydae
    - - Pezopallichthys

== Genera ==
=== Furcacauda ===
Furcacauda, the type genus of the order Furcacaudiformes, includes two species, F. heintzae and F. fredholmae. Fossils of the genus have been dated to the Lower Devonian. Its discovery and analysis gave rise to Wilson's and Caldwell's theory that stomachs evolved before jaws, based on sediment infillings found in fossils of F. heintzae.

=== Canonia ===
Canonia was a part of the family Furcacaudidae, and the order Furcacaudiformes. It is the earliest discovered member of Furcacaudiformes, described in 1980 by palaeontologist Jutta Vieth. There are two species, C. costulata and C. grossi, with the latter being the type species of the genus.

=== Cometicercus ===
Cometicercus was a member of the family Furcacaudidae that lived during the Early Devonian. It is only known from fragmentary fossilized remains of its caudal fin and parts of its dorsal surface, including its dorsal fin.

=== Sphenonectris ===
Sphenonectris, like Cometicercus, lived during the Early Devonian. Its body was hunched and pomacanthid-esque, almost resembling modern marine angelfish in its qualities. Like other Furcacaudids, its only visible fin was the caudal fin.
