= Hoedjiespunt =

Hominid fossil-bearing site in South Africa

Hoedjiespunt Fossil Site
- Location within Western Cape
- Location: Western Provence, South Africa
- Nearest city: Saldanha Bay, South Africa
- Coordinates: 33°01′43″S 17°57′34″E
- Area: less than 30 m
- Governing body: State

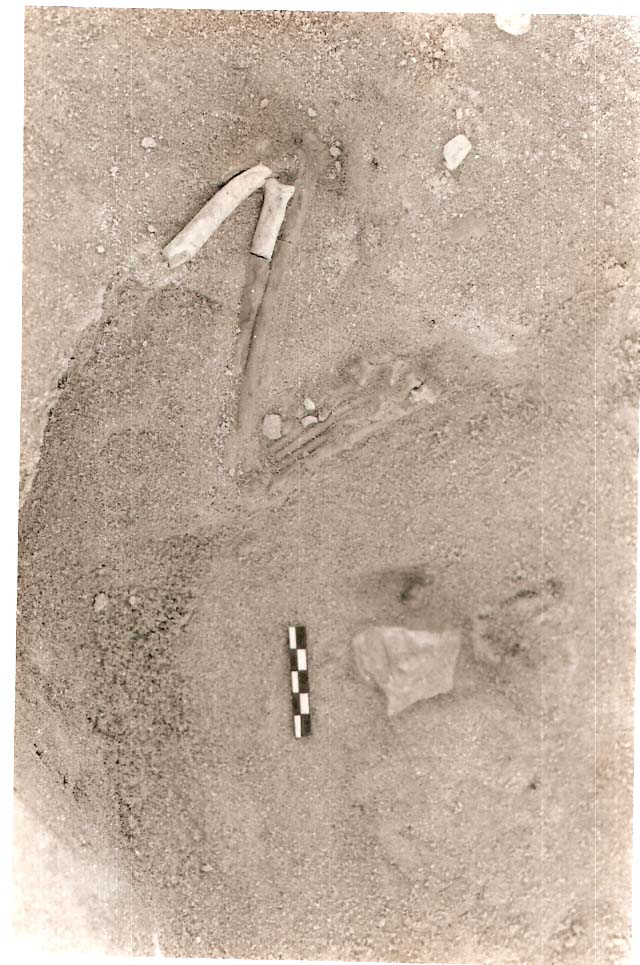
Fossil jackal arm in-situ at the Hoedjispunt site. Note the fingers in articulation just above the scale.

Hoedjiespunt is a Middle Pleistocene aged hominid fossil-bearing site on the West coast of South Africa, near the town of Saldanha Bay. The site is an ancient brown hyena lair dug into the side of a sand dune, located on a peninsula overlooking the Atlantic Ocean. The site became fossilized under a large calcrete formation around 280,000 years ago, at which time it was likely several kilometers from the ocean.

== Fossil discovery ==
Prior to the early 1990s, Hoedjiespunt had been known for several years as a fossil locality after roadworks had exposed abundant bone when a grader dug into a fossilized sand dune. A number of very fragile fossils were subsequently recovered in the initial search. In 1993, a single fossil hominid tooth was found in fragments eroding from the surface of the deposit, prompting further excavations which recovered many thousands of fossils, among them teeth, skull fragments and a tibia shaft from a juvenile hominid attributed to Homo heidelbergensis. However, Stynder et al. (2001) suggest that the evidence from the mandibular incisors from HDP1 is "insufficient to point to closer affinities of the HDP1 sample with either African or European Middle Pleistocene Hominids."

== Related links ==
- Hominids
- List of fossil sites
