= Thẩm Khuyên Cave =

Cave formation in Vietnam

Coordinates: 21.9236°N 106.4139°E

The Tham Khuyen Cave is a palaeontological formation located in Vietnam. It dates to the Jurassic period. The cave is located in Lang Son province, about 125 kilometers northeast of Hanoi.

== See also ==
- List of fossil sites
