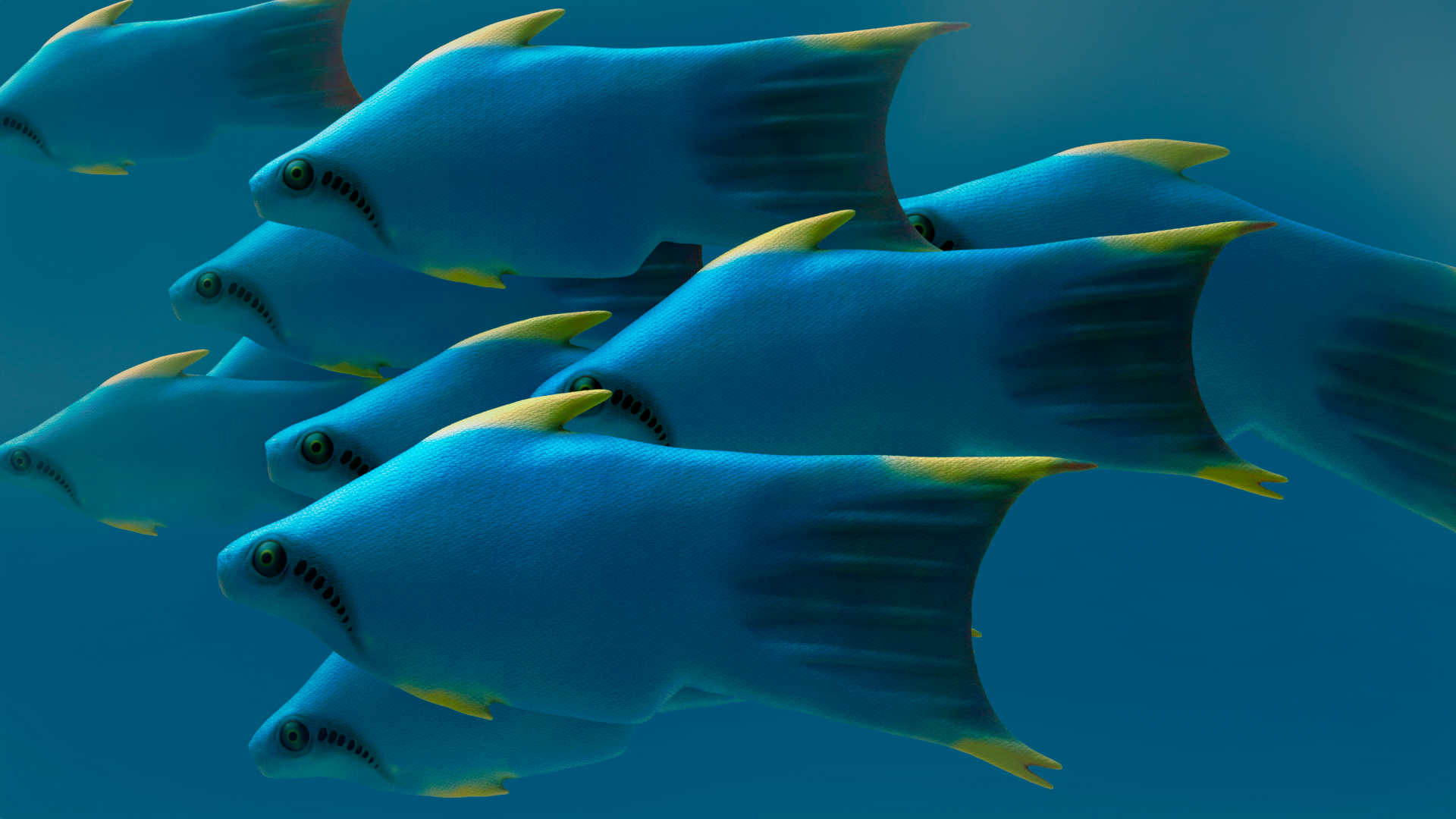
- Furcacauda fredholmae

Scientific classification
- Kingdom: Animalia
- Phylum: Chordata
- Infraphylum: Agnatha
- Class: †Thelodonti
- Order: †Furcacaudiformes
- Family: †Furcacaudidae
- Genus: †Furcacauda; Wilson & Caldwell, 1998

Type species
- Furcacauda heintzae

Species
- Furcacauda heintzae; Furcacauda fredholmae

= Furcacauda =

Furcacauda Temporal range: 419.2–393.3 Ma Lower Devonian

Genus of jawless fishes

Furcacauda is a genus of thelodontid agnathan from the Lower Devonian of Canada, and is the type genus of the order Furcacaudiformes. It contains two species, both of which hail from the MOTH locality in the Mackenzie Mountains of the Northwest Territories.

Furcacaudiform thelodontids were deep water jawless vertebrates with symmetrical fork and lobed-finned tails and scales smaller than typical loganellid and nikoliviid thelodonti scales. Furcacaudiform thelodonts are noted as having a laterally compressed body, large anterior eyes, slightly posterior, lateral, and vertical to a small mouth, and a condensed curved row of branchial openings (gills) directly posterior to the eyes. Many but not all had laterally paired fins. Wilson and Caldwell also note the presence of a caudal peduncle and a long caudal fin made of two large lobes, one dorsal and one ventral separated by 8 to 14 smaller intermediate lobes, giving the appearance of a striated half-moon shaped tail resembling the tail of a heterostracan. A large square cavity within the gut connecting a small intestine to an anal opening lead many to believe that it is this genus that exhibits the first vertebrate stomach. According to Wilson and Caldwell, their discovery of sediment infillings of fossils of the Furcacauda heintze fossils gives credence to the evolutionary development of stomach before jaws.

The scales of Furcacauda are robust and abrasion-resistant, similar to modern sharks which live among rough substrates such as rocky caves or reefs.

== Gallery of species ==
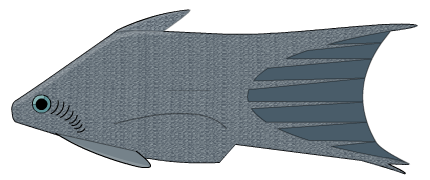
Furcacauda heintzae

Furcacauda fredholmae
