= Zhongming Formation =

Paleontological formation in China

The Zhongming Formation is a palaeontological formation located in China. It dates to the Devonian period.

== See also ==
- List of fossil sites
