= Tralcán Formation =

Triassic age geological formation in Chile

- Stratigraphic range: Rhaetian
- Type: Geological formation
- Underlies: Quaternary glacial deposits
- Overlies: Trafún Metamorphic Complex
- Thickness: >800 m (2,600 ft)

Lithology
- Primary: Conglomerate, sandstone, mudstone
- Other: Shale

Location
- Coordinates: 39.8°S 72.5°W
- Region: Los Ríos Region
- Country: Chile

Type section
- Named for: Tralcán
- Named by: Aguirre & Levi
- Year defined: 1964
- Tralcán Formation (Chile)

Tralcán Formation (Spanish: Formación Tralcán) is a sedimentary formation of Triassic age in Los Ríos Region in south–central Chile. It overlies unconformably the Trafún Metamorphic Complex. Tralcán Formation and nearby Panguipulli Formation form possibly the remnants of an ancient lake and river system. The formation is named after Mount Tralcán on the western edge of Riñihue Lake.

== Description ==
The Tralcán Formation was first defined by Aguirre and Levi in 1964, based on the outcrop at Tralcán. The more than 800 metres (2,600 ft) thick formation comprises reddish-grey conglomerates with a sandy matrix and intercalated reddish shales. The shales of the formation contain abundant fossil flora. Fossils of Cladophlebistenia oeshi have helped to redefine the age of the formation, that was formerly considered Late Jurassic (Kimmeridgian to Tithonian), to the Rhaetian of the Triassic.

== Fossil content ==
The following genera of fossil flora have been identified in the formation:

- Asterotheca
- Cladophlebis
- Dicroidium
- Ginkgoites
- Gleichenites
- Heidiphyllum
- Johnstonia
- Lepidopteris
- Linguifolium
- Neocalamites
- Phoenicopsis
- Pseudoctenis
- Pterophyllum
- Rissikia
- Sphenobaiera
- Taeniopteris
