= Oi Formation =

Geologic formation in Japan

The Oi Formation is a palaeontological formation located in the Ichishi region of Central Japan. It is part of the Miocene Ichishi Group, which dates to the Lower Miocene period. The Kamimitsugano tuffaceous sandstone members of the Oi Formation were found to contain two of the oldest fossils of still existent species (the Ophiomusium lymani and Ophiochiton cf. fastigatus).

== See also ==
- List of fossil sites
