= Yushima Formation =

Geologic formation in Japan

The Yushima Formation, also known as the Tatsunokuchi Formation, is a palaeontological formation in Japan, dating to the Lower Pliocene period.

== See also ==
- List of fossil sites
