= Huadian Formation =

Geological formation in Jilin Province, China

- Stratigraphic range: Eocene
- Type: Geological formation

Location
- Region: Jilin
- Country: China

The Huadian Formation is a palaeontological geological formation located in Jilin Province, northern China.

It dates to the Eocene period.

== See also ==
- List of fossil sites
