= Indricotherium Formation =

Geologic formation in Kazakhstan

- Stratigraphic range: Oligocene
- Type: Geological formation

Location
- Location: Kazakhstan

Type section
- Named for: Paraceratherium

The Indricotherium Formation is a palaeontological formation located in Kazakhstan. It dates to the Oligocene period.

It is named after Paraceratherium, also commonly known as Indricotherium, an extinct genus of gigantic hornless rhinoceros-like mammals of the family Hyracodontidae.

== See also ==
- List of fossil sites
