= Kishima Group =

Geologic formation in Japan

- Stratigraphic range: Paleogene
- Type: Geological formation

Location
- Country: Japan

The Kishima Group is a group of palaeontological geological formations located in Japan.

It dates to the Upper Eocene—Lower Oligocene epochs of the Paleogene Period, in the Cenozoic Era.

The formations of the Kishima Group are:

- Daimyoji Formation
- Funazu Formation
- Itanoura Formation
- Kakinoura Formation
- Kishima Formation
- Magome Formation
- Matsushima Formation
- Okinoshima Formation
- Oshima Formation

== See also ==
- List of fossil sites
