= Krukowski Quarry =

Quarry in Wisconsin, USA

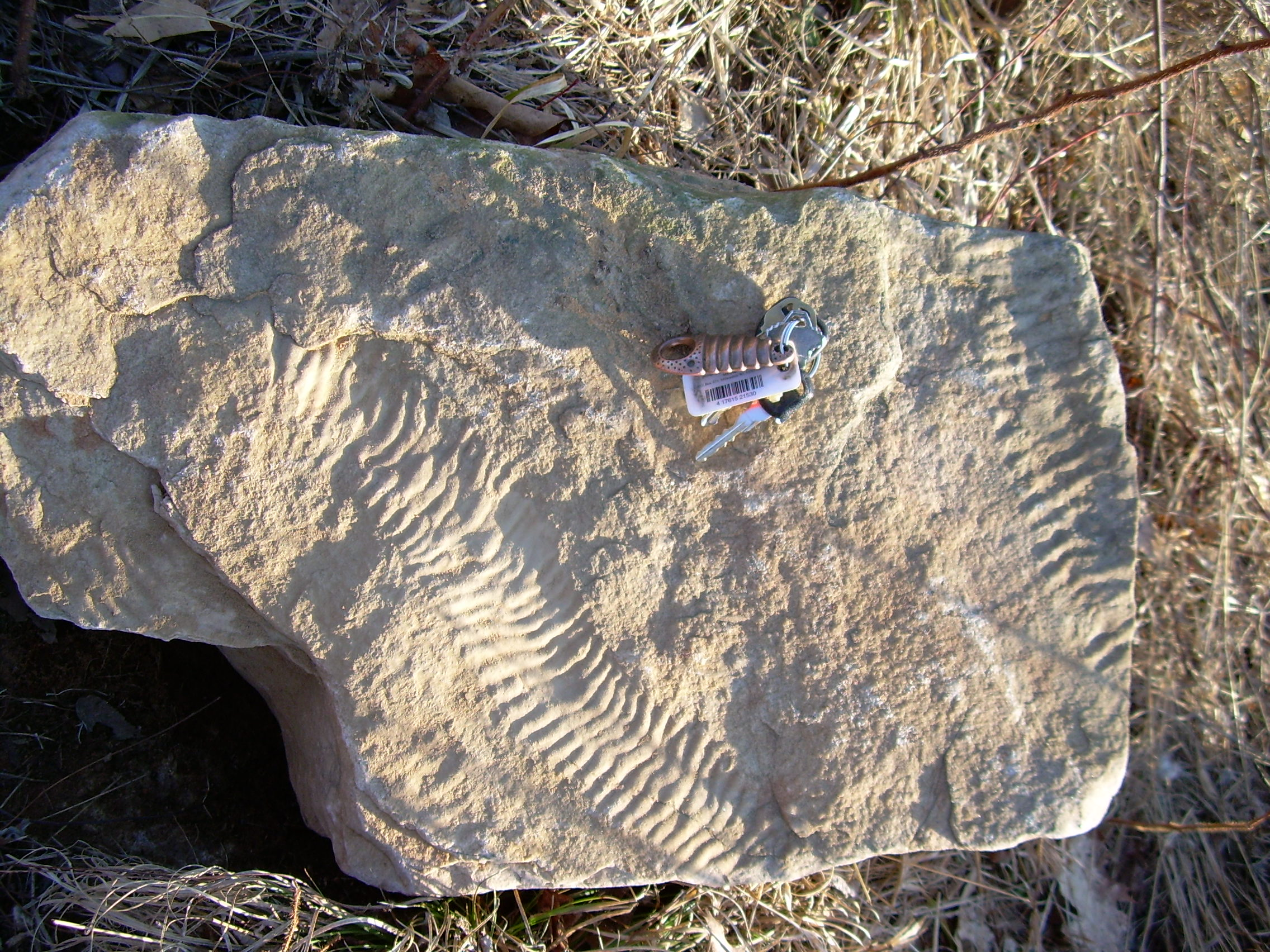
- Climactichnites burrow

- Location within Wisconsin
- Location: Wisconsin, USA; 44.714°N 89.524°W
- Opened: 1978

Krukowski Quarry is a quartzite sandstone quarry near Mosinee, Wisconsin. In the late Cambrian period (510 m.y.a.), this area was a beach and shoreline, and the quarry is well known for abundant fossil impressions of Climactichnites, Protichnites, and beached jellyfish, Scyphozoan Medusae. Pre-Devonian evidence of this jellyfish is exceedingly rare; this location and one in New Brunswick hold the only known fossils. The fossilized tracks of Climactichnites and Protichnites are also amongst the best preserved examples in the world. No fossilized remains of the either animal exist, making them enigmatic species. The quality and quantity of these fossil tracks in the quarry are extremely valuable to paleontologists.

== History ==
Krukowski Quarry was founded in 1978 by Jeff Krukowski in Irma Hill and Blackberry Hill near Mosinee, Wisconsin, and is owned by Krukowski and his wife and children. The Krukowski Stone Company, incorporated in May 1984, manages the quarry. At present, the quarry has over 1,000 acres of quarriable land and possesses 37,000 feet of European sawing equipment. The quarry is known for sedimentary rock slabs used in applications such as countertops.

== Paleontology ==
The quarry is known for Cambrian fossils that have been discovered since its founding.

The most prominent fossils found at the quarry are scyphozoan medusae (true jellyfish) ranging in diameter from 50 to 70 centimeters, the largest jellyfish in the fossil record; these were initially discovered in 1998 by Dan Damrow, who published with paleontologist James Hagadorn. Paleontologists have also discovered slug- and mollusk-like climactichnites, as well as fossilized trackways of anthropods (including protichnites and diplichnites), and stromatolites including elephant skin, sand-chips, and domal sand stromatolites.

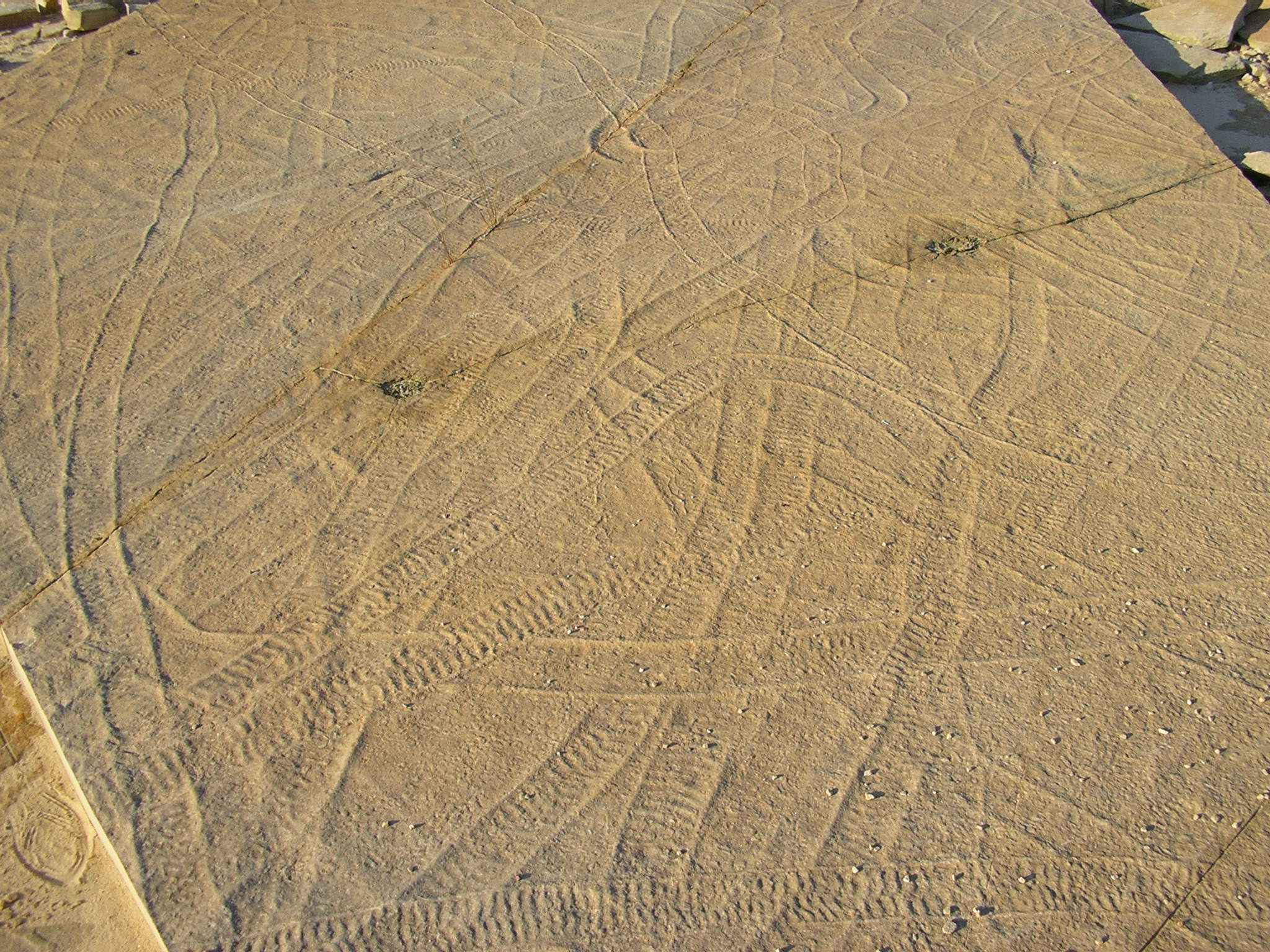
Climactichnites
