= Kashima District =

Kashima District may refer to places in Japan:

- Kashima District, Ibaraki, a former district
- Kashima District, Ishikawa, a district
