= Drepanolepis =

- Reconstruction of Drepanolepis maerssae

Scientific classification
- Kingdom: Animalia
- Phylum: Chordata
- Infraphylum: Agnatha
- Class: †Thelodonti
- Order: †Furcacaudiformes
- Genus: †Drepanolepis

Species
- Drepanolepis maerssae

Extinct genus of jawless fishes

Drepanolepis is an extinct genus of furcacaudiform thelodont which lived in the Northwest Territories of Canada during the Early Devonian period. It hails from the MOTH locality in the Mackenzie Mountains.

== Description ==
Drepanolepis possessed a tall, angelfish-like body, with a ventral mouth and a hypocercal tail. The gill atrium is large for this order, and the nasal runs down to the oral cavity from the orbit. The oral cavity is jawless, with no premaxilla or maxilla present.

The scales of Drepanolepis likely served an anti-parasite role, similar to modern sharks which form large groups and cruise at slow to medium speeds.
