= Cozla Fossil Site =

Romanian paleontological reserve

- IUCN category IV (habitat/species management area)
- A map of the Cozla Fossil Site protected area

- Location within Romania
- Location: Neamț County, Romania
- Nearest city: Piatra Neamț
- Coordinates: 46.9442°N 26.3661°E
- Area: 0.53 km^{2} (0.20 sq mi)
- Max. elevation: 700m

The Cozla Fossil Site is located near the town of Piatra Neamț in Neamț County, Romania. The limestones exposed at this site are part of the Cozla Formation. The first fossils from the site were found in 1883, consisting of fish from the Oligocene epoch. Four areas containing fossils have been identified around the town of Piatra Neamț, those being Cernegura, Pietricica, Cozla and Agârcia. The fish fossils identified at the site were the first discovered in Romania.

== History ==
The Cozla Fossil Site was located under the Paratethys Sea approximately 60-35 million years ago, with the fossils found in the area consisting mostly of fish and shells characteristic of a subtropical climate. The first fossils from the site were discovered in Cozla and Pietricica from 1883-1885, around the time where paleontological studies across Europe were commencing.

The Cozla Fossil Site was declared a protected area in 2000 due to the diverse nature of fossil fauna discovered in the area. A total of 102 species have been identified at the site.

The Cozla Fossil Site became an IUCN Category IV protected area in 2008.
