= Tralcán =

Mountain in Chile

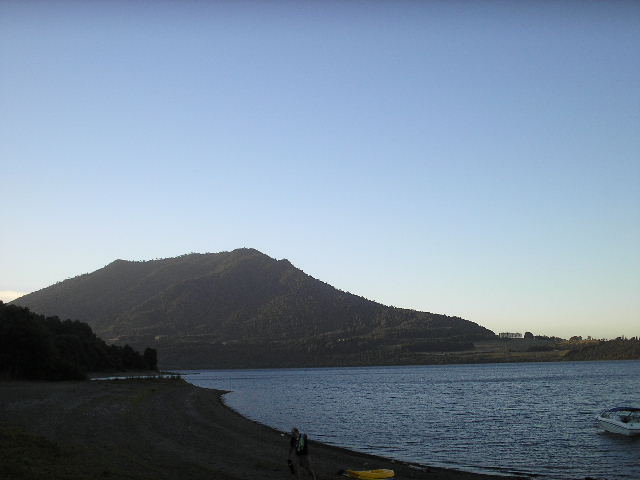
- View of Tralcán from the south side of Riñihue

Highest point
- Elevation: around 1,024 meters
- Coordinates: 39°47′33″S 72°28′42″W

Geography
- Location: West of Riñihue Lake, Valdivia Province, Chile
- Parent range: Andes

Geology
- Rock age: Triassic

Climbing
- First ascent: Probably prehispanic.

Tralcán (Mapudungun for thunder) is a triangular-shaped mountain, which is located near Riñihue Lake, Chile. It is located south of the outflow dividing western Riñihue in two arms. Despite having been sacred to the Huilliches for centuries, the mount became famous when several landslides near Tralcan dammed the Riñihue Lake after the 1960 Valdivia earthquake. The water levels in the lake rose more than 20 m and became a threat to the existence of Valdivia city. These events came to be known as The Riñihuazo ("El Riñihuazo" in Spanish). There is evidence that a similar landslide occurred after the 1575 Valdivia earthquake.

The mountain is made of volcanic sediments from the Triassic making it one of the few fossiliferous sequences from the Mesozoic in Zona Sur. These sediments are known as the Tralcán Formation.

Northwest of Tralcán lies the hill Llecué.
