= Anjar Formation =

Geologic formation in India

- Stratigraphic range: Maastrichtian; ~70–66 Ma
- Type: Geological formation

Lithology
- Primary: Limestone, Shale

Location
- Region: Gujarat, Kachchh
- Country: India

The Anjar Formation is a geologic formation in India where dinosaur eggs have been found.
