= Altholepis =

Altholepis Temporal range: Lochkovian– Pragian

Scientific classification
- Kingdom: Animalia
- Phylum: Chordata
- Class: Chondrichthyes
- Order: Altholepidiformes
- Family: Altholepididae
- Genus: Altholepis Karatajūtė-Talimaa, 1997

Genus of Chondrichthyes

Altholepis is an extinct genus of stem-chondrichthyian from the early Devonian. It is known by two described species: A. composita and A. salopensis. A. composita is the type species and was described in the Lochkovian of Ukraine. It is also reported from the Lochkovian and Pragian of Spain, as well as the Lochkovian of the MOTH site and Britain. A. salopensis was described out of the Lochovian aged lower Old Red Sandstone of Wales and southern England. It has been suggested all of these sites have other species that are currently undescribed.
