= Pleistocene fossils in Michigan =

Pleistocene fossils

Throughout the State of Michigan in the United States, many people have found the remains of Pleistocene mammals, almost exclusively mammoths and mastodons. Most of these fossils are found by farmers or construction workers, but most are now in the collection of the University of Michigan. The finding of vertebrate fossils in Michigan is quite rare, so it is best to turn over any specimens to a university or museum for proper cleaning and documentation. Many of these mastodon fossils are found in Southern Michigan, mostly around Ann Arbor.

== Pleistocene mammals of Michigan ==
- American mastodon, †Mammut americanum

The American mastodon is not only a spectacular fossil found in southern Michigan, but is Michigan's state fossil. It is believed that these animals fed on trees, and lived in herds, much like modern elephants. Along with mammoths, specimens of mastodons with marks from stone tools have been found, which means that they were probably hunted. Fossils of this animal have been found in almost every county in the Lower Peninsula.

- American elk/wapiti, Cervus canadensis

American elk (or wapiti) have been found in the southern regions of Michigan. These elk could have belonged to the extinct subspecies, the Eastern elk (†Cervus canadensis canadensis).

- Columbian mammoth, †Mammuthus columbi

This species of Mammoth has been found in Michigan. It is believed to have eaten mostly grass based on the characteristics of its teeth. These animals were much like the horse, chewing their food from side to side. Specimens of this animal have been found with marks on their bones from what is believed to have been stone tools, which suggests that ancient indigenous people hunted and butchered these huge animals.

- Caribou, Rangifer tarandus

Caribou were historically present in the state of Michigan up until 1928. Fossils of caribou have been found in Michigan and date to the late Pleistocene. These caribou belonged to the subspecies boreal woodland caribou (Rangifer tarandus caribou).

- Flat-headed peccary, †Platygonus compressus

These extinct peccaries have been found throughout the Great Lakes region, including Michigan. They are often found in herds, suggesting social behavior similar to modern-day peccaries.

- Giant beaver, †Castoroides ohioensis

This was by far the largest beaver ever to live, growing up to 7 feet long. Only five sites have ever been recovered, and most of what has been found are parts of the skull and lower jaw.

- Gray wolf, Canis lupus

3 specimens of this wolf have been found in the state. These predators likely hunted medium-sized game, such as Stag moose, Woodland muskox, and other herbivores.

- Stag moose, †Cervalces scotti

Only one specimen of this animal has been found in Michigan, an antler that was found in Berrien County.

- Woolly mammoth, †Mammuthus primigenius

Remains of the famed Woolly mammoth have been found across the state. Although rarer than its close cousin, the Columbian mammoth, they would have interacted with each other frequently. This caused interbreeding and hybridization to happen. These hybrids were thought to be distinct species adapted to Great Lakes environments and were named Mammuthus jeffersonii, which is now considered a junior synonym of M. columbi.

- Woodland muskox, †Bootherium bombifrons

There are seven sites in Michigan where this animal has been found, and it is believed that it roamed the plains of North America in large numbers.

- White-tailed deer, Odocoileus virginianus

6 fossil specimens of this extant deer have been found throughout the state.

- North American beaver, Castor canadensis

2 fossil specimens of this extant rodent have been found in Michigan. They likely played a part in shaping the post-glacial wetlands of Pleistocene Michigan.
