= Llecué =

Mountain in Chile

- Location within Chile

Highest point
- Elevation: 633 m (2,077 ft)
- Coordinates: 39°47′28.34″S 72°34′21.92″W

Geography
- Location: Chile
- Parent range: Loncoche Massif

Geology
- Rock age: Paleozoic
- Mountain type(s): Block mountain, Mittelgebirge

Llecué is a mountain in the commune of Los Lagos in Los Ríos Region, southern Chile. The mountain lies west of mount Tralcán and immediately south of San Pedro River. The eastern slope of the mountain is a sharp fault scarp as is part of its western slope. The name of the mountain is Mapuche based on llecu, meaning near, and hue, meaning place. The mountain lies next to the catastrophic landslide of 1575 which dammed San Pedro River causing a flood when the dam burst.
