= Paleontological site =

Natural deposit containing fossils

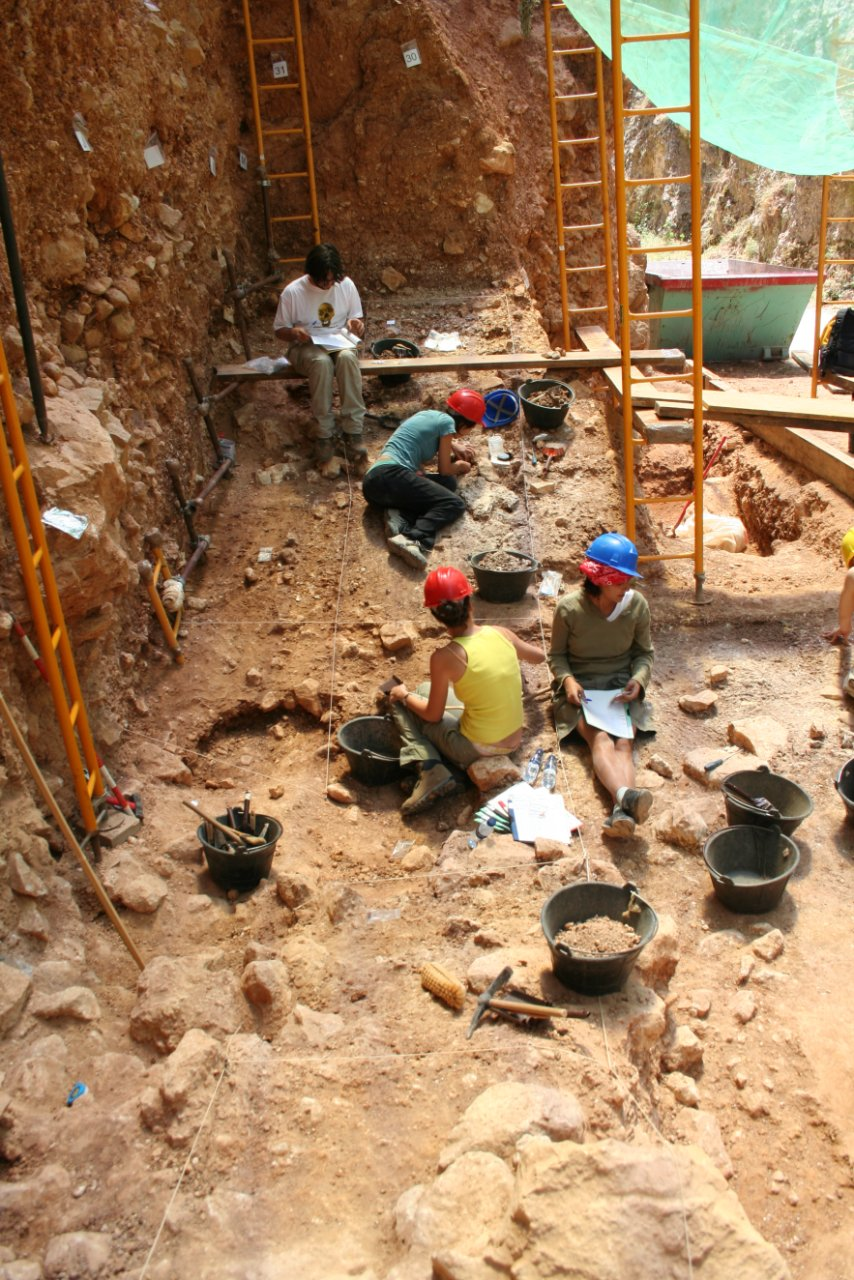
Sima del Elefante, one of the Atapuerca sites, Spain.

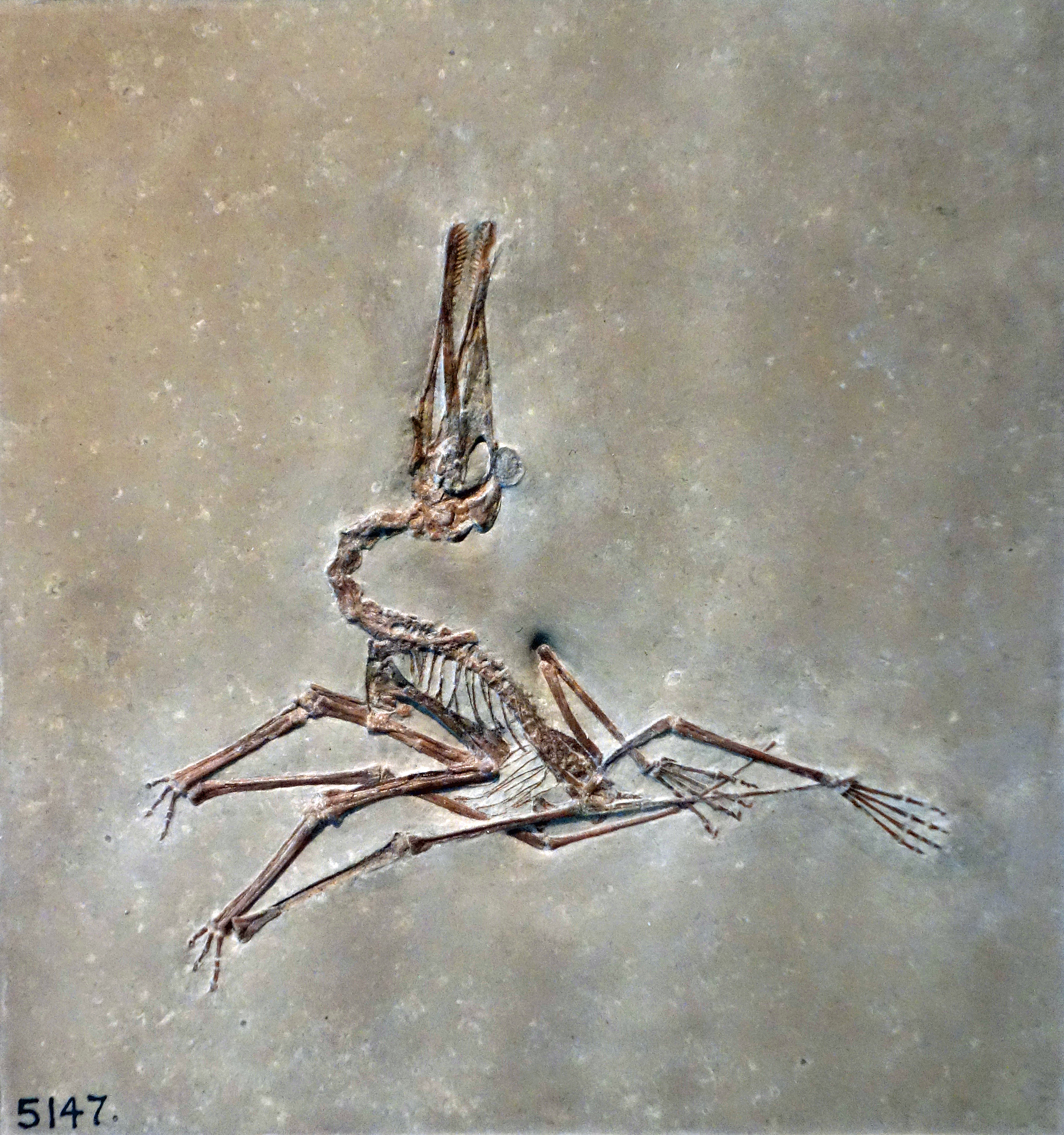
Fossil of a pterosaur (Ctenochasma) from the Solnhofen Limestone, Germany (American Museum of Natural History, New York, US).

A paleontological or fossiliferous site is a locality in which a significant quantity of fossils is naturally preserved in the rocks. The extent of the site is determined, in some cases, by the spatial distribution of the concentration of fossils and in others by practical issues of sampling or excavation. The discipline that studies the formation of fossil sites is the part of paleontology called taphonomy.

The term paleontological site is somewhat ambiguous and its use is more practical than scientific, so it can refer to localities in which several fossiliferous layers of different ages appear, whose study must be faced by clearly separating each layer (strictly speaking, each layer would be a different site).

The term fossil-lagerstätte (from the German Fossillagerstätte, "fossil site") is often used for some sites with a special quality of fossils or with a high number of remains.

== Types of sites ==
Fossils can be found in many different types of rocks, mostly sedimentary, but sometimes volcanic (ash or lava flows).

Sites of sedimentary origin usually have very different characteristics depending on the sedimentary medium, whether they are sediments of marine, continental (fluvial or lacustrine) or transitional origin. The stratigraphy in marine environments usually has great lateral continuity and the fossils are more or less distributed over large areas (e.g., in the Solnhofen Limestones in Germany), whereas sediments of continental origin, mostly derived from the upper and middle reaches of rivers or from alluvial fans are usually more irregular and discontinuous, with fossils concentrated in only a few facies, usually in stream beds or scattered in alluvial plain (e.g., the Torralba and Ambrona sites in Spain).

Another type of continental sediments are the hypogeous sediments of karstic origin, where groundwater circulation causes the redistribution, mixing and accumulation of red decalcification clays and fossil remains (e.g. Sima de los Huesos in Atapuerca, Spain).

A peculiar site of mixed lacustrine-karst origin is the site of Bernissart (Belgium), where a subterranean karst system, through the continuous lowering of a doline, conditioned the sedimentation that took place in the lacustrine and marsh environment installed on it, gradually "swallowing" the sediments together with the abundant complete bones of iguanodonts and other vertebrates that they contained.

Of volcanic origin is the deposit of Australopithecus ichnites on volcanic ash at Laetoli (Tanzania).

Also of volcanic origin are the deposits formed by the lacustrine filling of the maar resulting from a phreatomagmatic eruption, although in this case the volcanism is the cause of the formation of a small basin, not the sedimentary filling. Of this type are the sites of Messel (Germany), with abundant and exceptionally well-preserved Eocene fossils, or the site of La Higueruelas (Ciudad Real, Spain), from the Upper Pliocene, which records an abundant and varied fauna of terrestrial mammals, birds, amphibians and reptiles.

== See also ==
- Archaeological site
- Depositional environment
- Field (mineral deposit)
- Geological formation
- List of fossil sites
- Petrified wood
