= La Roma =

La Roma is a Miocene fossil site in the Teruel Province of Spain.

A micropaleontological analysis of the digestion and diet of hyenas of the latter part of the Miocene age was made possible from a large sample of coprolite in the La Roma 2 site. A species of Hipparion from the later Vallesian was found at La Roma 2.

Bones of the rhinoceros Dicerorhinus schleiemacheri in La Roma 2 and Masia del Barbo in the Teruel region were exceptionally larger than the upper range for the species as specified by Guérin (1980).

Excavation of two sites assigned to MN 10 contained the youngest example of the Semigenneta (Viverridae) and the oldest Ursidae (bear) genus Indarctos.
