= Tanohata Formation =

Geologic formation in Japan

- Stratigraphic range: Aptian
- Type: Geological formation

Location
- Country: Japan

The Tanohata Formation is a Mesozoic geologic formation in northeastern Japan. Dinosaur remains diagnostic to the genus level are among the fossils that have been recovered from the formation.

== See also ==
- List of dinosaur-bearing rock formations
  - List of stratigraphic units with few dinosaur genera
