= Panguipulli Formation =

Geologic formation in Chile

- Stratigraphic range: Triassic
- Type: Geological formation
- Underlies: Quaternary sediments and lavas Estratos de Lago Ranco
- Thickness: more than 800 m (2,600 ft)

Lithology
- Primary: Sandstone, mudstone, conglomerate

Location
- Region: Araucanía Region; Los Ríos Region
- Country: Chile

Type section
- Named for: Panguipulli
- Named by: Aguirre & Levi
- Year defined: 1964

Panguipulli Formation (Spanish: Formación Panguipulli) is a sedimentary formation of Triassic age located in Los Ríos Region and southernmost Araucanía Region in south–central Chile. The formation is variously covered by Quaternary lavas in the east and Quaternary moraines, Holocene alluvium and colluvium in the west. The formation itself may possibly be the remnants of an ancient lake and river system. The formation is named after the town of Panguipulli on the western edge of Panguipulli Lake. The formation has evidence of low grade metamorphism and is locally intruded by plutons of the North Patagonian Batholith that are of Jurassic, Cretaceous and Miocene age.
