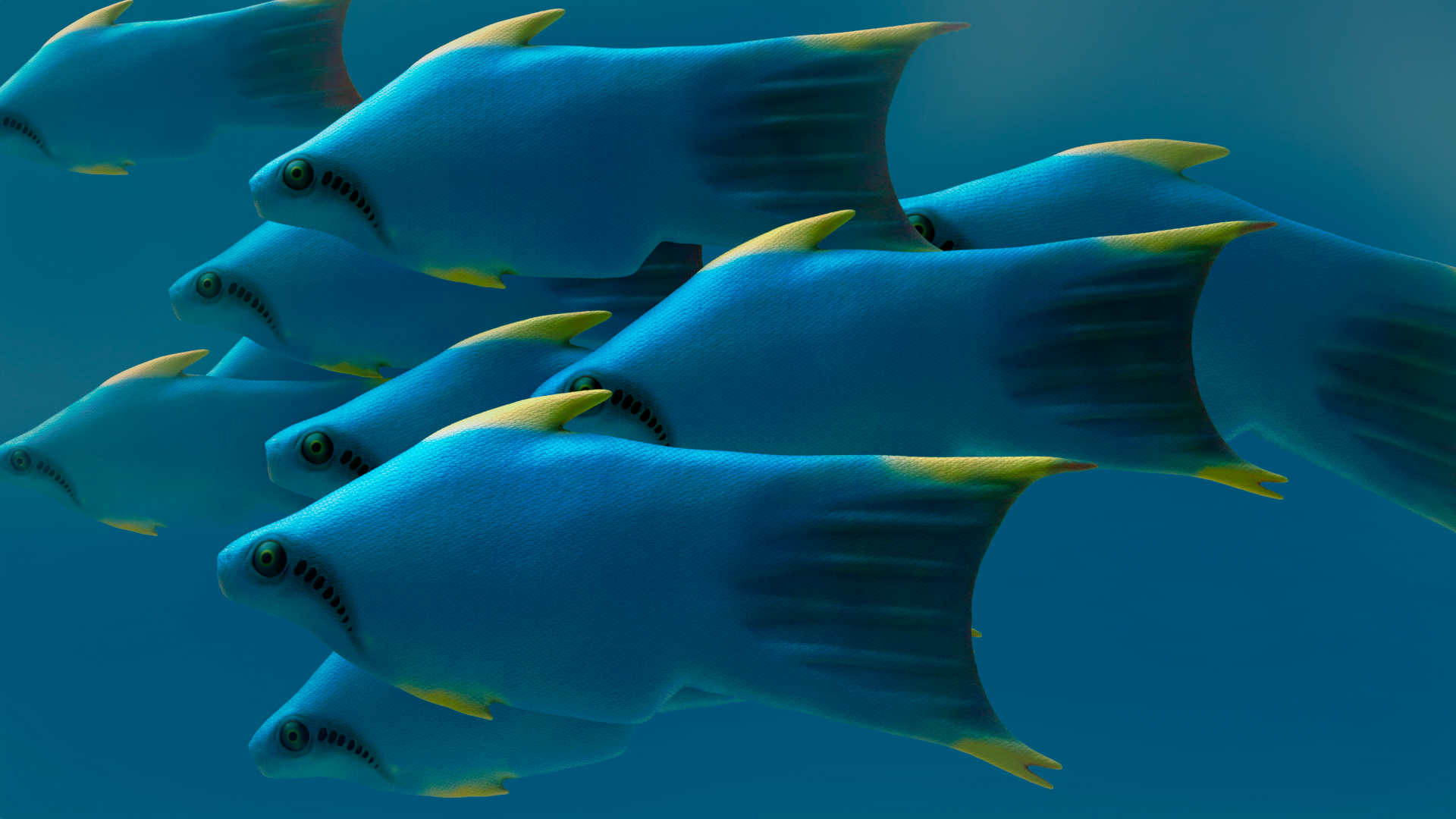
- Furcacauda fredholmae

Scientific classification
- Kingdom: Animalia
- Phylum: Chordata
- Infraphylum: Agnatha
- Class: †Thelodonti
- Order: †Furcacaudiformes; Wilson & Caldwell, 1998

Type genus
- †Furcacauda Wilson & Caldwell, 1998

Families
- †Apalolepididae; †Barlowodidae; †Drepanolepididae; †Furcacaudidae; †Lanarkiidae; †Nikoliviidae; †Pezopallichthyidae

= Furcacaudiformes =

Furcacaudiformes Temporal range: 453–358.9 Ma Katian - Famennian

Extinct order of jawless fishes

Furcacaudiformes is an extinct order of jawless fish in the class Thelodonti.

Because the paucity of intact fossils, especially since some families are known entirely from scale fossils, taxonomy of thelodonts is based primarily on scale morphology. A 2009 assessment of thelodont taxonomy by Wilson and Märss merges the orders Loganelliiformes, Katoporiida and Shieliiformes into Thelodontiformes, places families Lanarkiidae and Nikoliviidae into Furcacaudiformes (because of scale morphology) and establishes Archipelepidiformes as the basal-most order.
