= 2026 in paleoichthyology =

This list records new taxa of fossil fish that were announced or described in 2026. Other peer-reviewed publications on discoveries related to fish paleontology which occurred in that year are also detailed here.

== Jawless vertebrates ==
Name	Novelty	Status	Authors	Age	Type locality	Country	Notes	Images
Asioaspis	Gen. et sp. nov	Valid	Zhang et al.	Devonian (Lochkovian)	Xishancun Formation	China	A member of Galeaspida belonging to the group Polybranchiaspiformes. The type species is A. brachyotus.	
Bataspis	Gen. et sp. nov	Valid	Meng et al.	Devonian (Lochkovian)	Xishancun Formation	China	A member of Galeaspida belonging to the family Tridensaspidae. The type species is B. crux.	
Platyrhakis	Gen. et comb. nov	Valid	El Fassi El Fehri et al.	Devonian (Lochkovian)	Lower Old Red Sandstone	United Kingdom	A member of Zenaspidida of uncertain affinities. The type species is "Cephalaspis" traquairi Stensiö (1932).	
Rochtarge	Gen. et comb. nov	Valid	El Fassi El Fehri et al.	Devonian (Lochkovian)	Lower Old Red Sandstone	United Kingdom	A member of Osteostraci of uncertain affinities. The type species is "Cephalaspis" watsoni Stensiö (1932); genus also includes "Cephalaspis" spinifer Stensiö (1932) and "Cephalaspis" cwmmillensis White & Toombs (1983).	
Saigheadaspis	Gen. et comb. nov	Valid	El Fassi El Fehri et al.	Devonian (Lochkovian)	Lower Old Red Sandstone	United Kingdom	A member of Osteostraci of uncertain affinities. The type species is "Cephalaspis" websteri Stensiö (1932).	
Traquairosteus prius	Sp. nov	Valid	Glinskiy & Bolshiyanov in Glinskiy et al.	Devonian (Givetian)		Russia (Kursk Oblast)	A member of the family Psammosteidae.	
Xihaiaspis	Gen. et sp. nov	Valid	Zhang et al.	Silurian (Telychian)	Qingshui Formation	China	A member of Galeaspida belonging to the family Dayongaspidae. The type species is X. wuningensis.	
Ymersaspis	Gen. et comb. nov	Valid	El Fassi El Fehri et al.	Devonian (Lochkovian)	Lower Old Red Sandstone	United Kingdom	A member of Osteostraci of uncertain affinities. The type species is "Eucephalaspis" agassizi Lankester (1870).	

=== Jawless vertebrate research ===
- Evidence of presence of a pair of lateral eyes and pineal/parapineal organs likely functioning as camera-type eyes capable of image formation is reported in 6 specimens of Haikouichthys and 4 specimens of indeterminate myllokunmingids by Lei et al. (2026).
- Evidence from the study of eyes of Gilpichthys greenei, Myxinikela siroka and Squirmarius testai, indicative of gradual reduction and loss of complexity of hagfish eyes throughout the Paleozoic that likely happened before hagfish colonization of the continental slope, is presented by McCoy et al. (2026).
- Leflaëc et al. (2026) report evidence indicating that Pteraspidomorpha died out before fully exploring the diversity of headshield morphologies that were possible for them to achieve and that would enable the optimality of their hydrodynamic performance, and question whether the decline of ostracoderms was linked to constraints limiting the evolution of their morphological diversity.
- Schnetz et al. (2026) present a revised reconstruction of the oral apparatus of Athenaegis chattertoni.
- Reeves et al. (2026) provide new information on the anatomy of Jamoytius and Lasanius, including evidence of vertebrate biomineralization in both taxa and evidence of presence of complex camera-eye vertebrate eyes in Jamoytius.
- A study on the anatomy and affinities of Tyriaspis whitei is published by Li & Blom (2026).

== Placoderms ==
Name	Novelty	Status	Authors	Age	Type locality	Country	Notes	Images
Cuanyu	Gen. et sp. nov	Valid	Wen et al.	Devonian (Lochkovian)	Xitun Formation	China	A member of the family Actinolepidae. The type species is C. liui.	
Panjiangosteus	Gen. et sp. nov	Valid	Xue et al.	Devonian (Pragian)	Posongchong Formation	China	An antarctaspid placoderm. The type species is P. eurycephala.	
Yangfanyu	Gen. et sp. nov		Xian et al.	Devonian (Pragian)		China	An early member of Euantiarcha. Genus includes new species Y. anachoresis.	
Yipetalichthys	Gen. et sp. nov		Pan et al.	Devonian (Eifelian)	Shangshuanghe Formation	China	A quasipetalichthyid placoderm. The type species is Y. maxiongensis.	

=== Placoderm research ===
- Pan, Zhang & Zhu (2026) reconstruct the diversification dynamics of placoderms throughout the Silurian and Devonian.
- He et al. (2026) provide new information on the anatomy of Entelognathus primordialis and Qilinyu rostrata, revising earlier descriptions of their opercular morphologies.
- Redescription of the anatomy and a study on the affinities of Bothriolepis yunnanensis is published by Yan et al. (2026).
- A study on the mandible biomechanical performance and dental complexity in eight eubrachythoracid placoderms from the Devonian Gogo Formation (Australia), providing evidence of different adaptations to feeding on hard objects in the studied taxa (interpreted as likely linked to the relative size of prey to predator), is published by Mitchell et al. (2026).

== Cartilaginous fishes ==
Name	Novelty	Status	Authors	Age	Type locality	Country	Notes	Images
Curvorudentis	Gen. et comb. nov	Valid	Begat et al.	Middle and Late Jurassic (Callovian to Kimmeridgian)		Germany; Poland	A member of Galeomorphii of uncertain affinities. The type species is "Synechodus" prorogatus Kriwet (2003).	
Echinochimaera curva	Sp. nov		Itano	Carboniferous (Viséan)	St. Louis Formation	United States (Indiana)		
Eoscyllium	Gen. et comb. nov	Valid	Delsate	Jurassic (Toarcian-Kimmeridgian)		Belgium; France; Germany; Luxembourg; United Kingdom	A carpet shark, probably a member of the family Hemiscylliidae. The type species is "Heterodontus" duffini Thies (1983).	
Galeorhinus semiserratus	Sp. nov	Valid	Cicimurri, Ebersole & Bowman	Eocene (Priabonian)	Tupelo Bay Formation	United States (South Carolina)	A species of Galeorhinus.	
Georgaello	Nom. nov	Valid	Greenfield	Late Jurassic		Germany	A replacement name for Aellopos Münster (1836)	
Listracanthus shaoyangensis	Sp. nov	Valid	Fang et al.	Permian (Wuchiapingian)	Longtan Formation	China		
Lonchidion minimorsus	Sp. nov		Keeble et al.	Late Triassic	Chinle Formation	United States (Arizona)		
Lonchidionoides	Gen. et sp. nov	Valid	Vullo et al.	Cretaceous (Barremian–Cenomanian)	Tiout Formation	Algeria; Brazil	A member of Hybodontiformes belonging to the family Lonchidiidae. The type species is L. trifurcatum.	
Magwayodus	Gen. et sp. nov		Adnet et al.	Eocene (Priabonian)	Yaw Formation	Myanmar	A requiem shark. The type species is M. boboi.	
Palaeobrachaelurus vanessae	Sp. nov	Valid	Delsate	Jurassic (Toarcian-Bajocian)		Belgium; France; Luxembourg	A member of the family Brachaeluridae.	
Parvodus graciliani	Sp. nov		Ribeiro & França	Late Jurassic	Aliança Formation	Brazil	A member of Hybodontiformes belonging to the family Lonchidiidae.	
Polyacrodus microdon	Sp. nov		Wen et al.	Early Triassic	Luolou Formation	China	A member of Hybodontiformes.	
Thiesoscyllium	Gen. et 2 sp. nov	Valid	Delsate	Jurassic (Toarcian-Bajocian)		Belgium; Luxembourg	A carpet shark, probably a member of the family Hemiscylliidae. The type species is T. underwoodi; genus also includes T. felteni.	
Tuyuria	Gen. et sp. nov		Lebedev in Lebedev et al.	Carboniferous (Viséan)		Russia (Tula Oblast)	A member of Edestoidea. Genus includes new species T. insolita.	

=== Cartilaginous fish research ===
- Kang et al. (2026) describe a new morphotype of ischnacanthid acanthodian jawbone from the Silurian strata from Estonia with a combinations of teeth covered with a white dental tissue and oral denticles without such tissue, reconstruct the growth series of the studied morphotype, report evidence of incomplete orthodentine mineralization in the white teeth (unlike in the denticles), and interpret these findings as evidence of possibilities of evolution of novel hard tissues through changes of their developmental processes.
- Acanthodian fossil material assigned to Acanthodes lopatini, previously known only from Carboniferous strata from Siberia, is described from the Tournaisian Obrutschew Bjerg Formation (Greenland) by Cowen et al. (2026).
- Ivanov et al. (2026) describe new cartilaginous fish fossil material from the Devonian and Carboniferous strata in China and Mongolia, including the first record of Anachronistiformes from Asia reported to date.
- A new assemblage of cartilaginous fish fossils, including the oldest record of Glikmanius occidentalis reported to date, is described from the Carboniferous (Bashkirian) Pottsville Formation (Alabama, United States) by Egli (2026).
- Maisey (2026) describes the internal morphology of the holotype braincase of Tamiobatis vetustus, and considers the species to be founded upon the type specimen inadequate for definitive diagnosis.
- A study on the morphology, histology and growth pattern of fin spines of Wellerodus priscus is published by Flament et al. (2026).
- Blanco-Ferrera et al. (2026) describe a tooth of a member of the genus Carcharopsis from the Carboniferous (Mississippian) strata of the Alba Formation (Spain), extending known geographical range of the genus into northern Gondwana.
- Bhat et al. (2026) describe a partially preserved Meckel's cartilage of a possible member of Eugeneodontiformes from the Permian strata of the Zewan Formation, representing the first finding of non-dental fossil material of a Permian cartilaginous fish in Kashmir.
- Duffin & Schweigert (2026) report the first discovery of fossil material of Chimaeropsis paradoxa from the Kimmeridgian strata of the Nusplingen Limestone (Germany).
- Manzanares et al. (2026) report evidence of preservation of whitlockite in dental plates of chimaeras from the Paleocene and Eocene strata in the United Kingdom.
- New fossil material of Phoebodus saidselachus, providing new information on the anatomy of members of this species, is described from the Devonian (Famennian) strata from eastern Anti-Atlas (Morocco) by Klug et al. (2026) .
- Velin et al. (2026) report the discovery of calcified cartilage from the Upper Triassic Chinle and Tecovas formations (Arizona and Texas, United States), interpreted as likely coming from xenacanthiform or hybodontiform sharks.
- Zhao et al. (2026) describe teeth of members of four euselachian taxa from the Ladinian-Carnian strata of the Falang Formation (Guizhou and Yunnan, China) with three-dimensional preservation of dental microstructure, confirming that that the assemblage including the studied teeth was dominated by non-durophagous sharks.
- Santos-Granzotti (2026) revises the fossil record of hybodontiforms from South America, and identifies 52 geological formations that might yield further fossils of members of this group.
- The oldest fossil material of a hybodontiform shark from Mexico reported to date is described from the Permian (Wordian) strata of the Las Delicias Formation by Cantalice et al. (2026).
- A tooth of an indeterminate hybodontiform representing the first confirmed fossil material of a cartilaginous fish from the Reifling Basin is described from the Carnian strata from the Scheiblingbach Lagerstätte (Austria) by Stumpf, Lukeneder & Winkler (2026).
- Evidence of differences in the structure of enameloid of Priohybodus arambourgi and modern sharks (in spite of similarities in external morphology of their teeth) is presented by Silva, Gallo & Eltink (2026).
- Trikolidi, Golubev & Novikov (2026) describe teeth of members of the genus Strophodus from the Lower Cretaceous (Valanginian and Hauterivian) strata from Crimea, expanding known geographical range of the genus.
- New fossil material of distobatid, hybodontid and lonchidiid hybodontiform sharks is described from the Cenomanian Alcântara Formation (Brazil) by Neves et al. (2026), providing evidence of biogeographic links between Cretaceous shark assemblages from South America and Africa.
- Gardiner et al. (2026) reconstruct changes of neoselachian diversity patterns throughout the last 145 million years, reporting evidence of a long-term diversity increase during the Cretaceous, approximately 10% decline in diversity during the Cretaceous–Paleogene extinction event, mid-Eocene diversity peak and gradual decline afterwards.
- Lopyrev, Popov & Ward (2026) argue that exclusion of the genus Eychlaodus from the family Orthacodontidae proposed by Villalobos-Segura et al. (2025) was based on erroneous interpretation of its morphology, and retain Eychlaodus as a valid genus for "Oxyrhina" lundgreni Davis (1890).
- Evidence of complexity of microstructure of enameloid in teeth and in denticles covering the elongated rostra of members of Sclerorhynchoidei, present in members of the group with diverse morphologies, is presented by Chateauneuf-Gautier & Guinot (2026).
- Türtscher, Jambura & Kriwet (2026) describe the skeletal anatomy of Myledaphus bipartitus, and recover it as a member of Rhinopristiformes.
- Redescription and a study on the affinities of Bavariscyllium tischlingeri is published by Stumpf et al. (2026).
- Amadori, Villalobos-Segura & Kriwet (2026) redescribe the holotype of Palaeoscyllium formosum, and report evidence of a distinctive fin configuration in the studied species.
- The youngest confirmed fossil material of Megascyliorhinus miocaenicus reported to date is described from the Pliocene (Piacenzian) strata from Castelfiorentino (Italy) by Collareta et al. (2026).
- Ariz et al. (2026) study the body size and age structure of the assemblage of members of the genus Carcharhinus from the Bahía Inglesa Formation (Chile), and interpret the studied assemblage as likely to be a fossil record of a shark aggregation area with a feeding and possibly also nursery function.
- A new assemblage of lamniform shark fossils, including possibly the youngest record of Scapanorhynchus cf. raphiodon reported to date, is described from the Upper Cretaceous (Campanian) strata of the Duwi Formation (Egypt) by Yassin et al. (2026).
- The first confirmed record of teeth of Ptychodus whipplei from South America is reported from the Upper Cretaceous (Campanian–Maastrichtian) Itamaracá Formation (Brazil) by Assumpção et al. (2026).
- A specimen of Squalicorax cf. pristodontus preserving teeth, vertebrae and cartilaginous postcrania and possibly representing the first known specimen of S. pristodontus with articulated dentition is described from the Upper Cretaceous (Campanian) strata of the Pierre Shale (Wyoming, United States) by Thompson & Mulcahy (2026).
- Santos Granzotti, Modesto Alves & Bampi (2026) revise the affinities of confirmed and purported fossil members of Alopiidae on the basis of the study of their dental characters.
- Baptista et al. (2026) report the discovery of a tooth of Otodus megalodon at the Rio Grande Rise, providing evidence of presence of the species in southern Atlantic Ocean during the early–middle Miocene.
- Herraiz et al. (2026) revise the fossil record of teeth of Otodus megalodon, finding no evidence of a significant differences of body size of members of Atlantic populations and Mediterranean populations other than the one known from the Miocene strata from the Reverté quarries (Spain), and interpret the Reverté assemblage as likely to be a fossil record of a nursery.
- Shimada et al. (2026) report rediscovery of the vertebral specimen of Otodus megalodon NHMD 157890 from the Miocene Gram Formation (Denmark), and confirm the accuracy of the original report of the maximum vertebral diameter (23 cm).
- Ferrón et al. (2026) reevaluate the dataset from the study of Shimada et al. (2023), and find no evidence of a significant relationship between sea-surface temperatures and body size in the fossil record of Otodus megalodon, and interpret the assemblages of small-bodied individuals as likely to be nurseries.
- Schwenk et al. (2026) compare zinc enrichment of the enameloid of Otodus obliquus and O. megalodon, finding evidence of higher concentrations of zinc in regions of teeth of O. megalodon affected by high stress during feeding and finding evidence of less pronounced spatial variation of zinc in teeth of O. obliquus, and interpret this finding as suggestive of a shift from a fish-based diet to preying on marine mammals during the evolutionary history of otodontid sharks.
- Gašparič et al. (2026) report the discovery of a regurgitalite (likely produced by a mackerel or hexanchid shark) with remains of the basking shark Keasius cf. septemtrionalis from the Miocene (Burdigalian) strata from Slovenia, extending known geographical range of Keasius into southeastern part of central Paratethys.
- Reichmann, Shimada & Long (2026) report the first discovery of fossil material of Pseudocarcharias rigida from the Miocene (Aquitanian) strata of the Pyramid Hill Sand Member of the Jewett Sand Formation (California, United States).
- McCormack et al. (2026) study the ecology of Late Cretaceous (Turonian–Coniacian) sharks from the Western Interior Seaway as indicated by enameloid zinc isotope values, providing evidence of high trophic positions of members of the genera Archaeolamna, Cretodus and Cretoxyrhina, and evidence of opportunistic and flexible dietary habits of members of the genus Cretalamna.
- Feichtinger et al. (2026) study changes of composition of the elasmobranch assemblages from the Byala Formation (Bulgaria) during the Cretaceous-Paleogene transition, reporting evidence of stronger ecological restructuring in shallower environments compared to deep-marine and high-latitude settings, and report the first discovery of fossil material of Cretascymnus from the Danian strata, indicative of survival of members of this genus past the Cretaceous–Paleogene extinction event.
- New assemblages of cartilaginous fish fossils are reported from the Cretaceous and Paleogene strata in the Kaliningrad Oblast (Russia) by Mychko et al. (2026).
- A new cartilaginous fish assemblage including taxa with European and North African affinites is reported from the Eocene strata from the Algarrobo Beds (Chile) by Otero et al. (2026).
- Marramà et al. (2026) report the discovery of a diverse elasmobranch assemblage from the Miocene (Aquitanian) strata from the Tunga Formation (Peru), representing the oldest Neogene vertebrate assemblage from the Pisco Basin reported to date.
- Takakuwa et al. (2026) identify teeth of Galeocerdo aduncus and Carcharhinus sp. associated with a specimen of the desmostylian Paleoparadoxia tabatai from the Miocene Akeyo Formation (Japan), as well as probable shark feeding traces on bones of the studied desmostylian.
- Lambert et al. (2026) report shark feeding traces on bones of cetacean specimens from the Pliocene Kattendijk Formation (Belgium), including evidence of a bluntnose sixgill shark feeding on a right whale Balaenella brachyrhynus and evidence of Carcharodon plicatilis feeding on a member of the genus Casatia.

== Ray-finned fishes ==
Name	Novelty	Status	Authors	Age	Type locality	Location	Notes	Images
Acanthophleges	Gen. et sp. nov	Valid	Calzoni, Giusberti & Carnevale in Calzoni et al.	Early Eocene (Ypresian)	Chiusole Formation	Italy	A member of the family Euzaphlegidae. The type species is A. lessiniae.	
Aijaichthys	Gen. et sp. nov	Valid	Ordóñez et al.	Late Jurassic (Tithonian)	Tinajones Formation	Peru	A member of Ellimmichthyiformes belonging to the family Ancashichthyidae. The type species is A. brevis Ordóñez & Arratia.	
Aminiichthys	Gen. et comb. nov	Valid	Ebert	Middle Jurassic (Callovian)	Oxford Clay	United Kingdom	A member of Pycnodontiformes belonging to the family Mesturidae. The type species is "Mesturus" leedsi Woodward (1895).	
Ancashichthys	Gen. et sp. nov	Valid	Ordóñez et al.	Late Jurassic (Tithonian)	Tinajones Formation	Peru	A member of Ellimmichthyiformes, the type genus of the new family Ancashichthyidae. The type species is A. peruensis Ordóñez & Arratia.	
Anomoeodus teneidaensis	Sp. nov	Valid	Marzouk et al.	Late Cretaceous (Maastrichtian)	Dakhla Formation	Egypt		
Bolcaichthys solanensis	Sp. nov	Valid	Calzoni, Giusberti & Carnevale in Calzoni et al.	Early Eocene (Ypresian)	Chiusole Formation	Italy	A member of the order Clupeiformes; a species of Bolcaichthys.	
Changoichthys	Gen. et sp. nov		Alvarado-Ortega & Carbot-Chanona	Late Cretaceous (Cenomanian)	Cintalapa Formation	Mexico	A member of Ichthyodectiformes belonging to the family Heckelichthyidae. Genus includes new species C. ovallesi.	
Confoundichthys	Gen. et comb. nov		Henderson & Giles	Carboniferous		United Kingdom	An early ray-finned fish. The type species is "Elonichthys" aitkeni Traquair (1886).	
Contemptor	Gen. et sp. nov	Valid	Calzoni, Giusberti & Carnevale in Calzoni et al.	Early Eocene (Ypresian)	Chiusole Formation	Italy	A member of the family Gempylidae. The type species is C. mastinoi.	
Coryphaenoides richi	Sp. nov	Valid	Schwarzhans, Moritz & Goedert	Oligocene	Makah Formation	United States (Washington)	A species of Coryphaenoides.	
Dactylopterus decrozi	Sp. nov		Aguilera, De Gracia, Buckup & Rodríguez in Aguilera et al.	Miocene	Chagres Formation	Panama	A member of the family Dactylopteridae.	
Elnorichthys	Gen. et sp. nov		Murray et al.	Late Cretaceous (Maastrichtian)	Scollard Formation	Canada (Alberta)	A beardfish, possibly a member of the family Boreiohydriidae. Genus includes new species E. pennockae.	
Enchodus machairus	Sp. nov		Nelson, Murray & Sims	Late Cretaceous	Niobrara Formation	United States (Kansas)		
Exeomastix	Gen. et sp. nov	Valid	Calzoni, Giusberti & Carnevale	Early Eocene (Ypresian)	Chiusole Formation	Italy	A member of the family Trichiuridae. The type species is E. zabimaru Calzoni, Giusberti & Carnevale in Calzoni et al. Its original generic name Eomastix is preoccupied by the fly Eomastix Jaschhof, 2009, necessitating creation of the replacement name.	
Franchessella	Gen. et sp. nov	Valid	Gonçalves et al.	Permian		France	A member of the family Aeduellidae. Genus includes new species F. pohlcremeri.	
Garrardiscus	Gen. et sp. nov	Valid	Shen	Carboniferous	Staunton Formation	United States (Indiana)	An early ray-finned fish, possibly a member of the new group Permocarbonimorpha. The type species is G. magnicephalus.	
Gondwanacanthus	Gen. et sp. nov	Valid	Ribeiro et al.	Early Cretaceous	Morro do Chaves Formation	Brazil	A member of Acanthomorpha of uncertain affinities. The type species is G. decollatus.	
Goodichthys	Gen. et sp. nov	Valid	Ebert	Late Jurassic (Tithonian)	Solnhofen Limestone	Germany	A member of Pycnodontiformes belonging to the family Mesturidae. The type species is G. prettii .	
Ictalurus geraldsmithi	Sp. nov		Grande & Lundberg	Oligocene (Whitneyan)	Brule Formation	United States (South Dakota)	A species of Ictalurus.	
Ikawaihere	Gen. et sp. nov		Gottfried et al.	Late Paleocene or Early Eocene	Red Bluff Tuff Formation	New Zealand (Chatham Islands)	A member of the family Megalopidae. The type species is I. koehleri.	
Jianghanichthys huachongensis	Sp. nov		Liu & Zhang	Eocene	Huachong/Huayong Formation	China	A member of Cypriniformes belonging to the family Jianghanichthyidae.	
Juramordax	Gen. et comb. nov	Valid	Cooper	Early Jurassic		Germany; Luxembourg	A member of Pachycormiformes; a new genus for "Sauropsis" veruinalis White (1925).	
Karabalyk	Gen. et sp. nov	Valid	Bakaev & Kogan	Permian (Wordian)		Russia (Orenburg Oblast)	A member of Palaeoniscimorpha belonging to the family Gonatodidae. The type species is K. esini.	
Landanaelops	Gen. et sp. nov	Valid	Taverne & Smith	Paleocene (Selandian)	Landana Formation	Angola	A member of the family Elopidae. The type species is L. gunnelli. Announced online in 2024; the final version of the article naming it was published in 2026.	
Leolepis	Gen. et sp. nov		Gallo et al.	Permian	Corumbataí Formation	Brazil	A member of Paramblypteriformes. The type species is L. matogrossensis.	
Lepidoclupea	Gen. et sp. nov	Valid	Calzoni, Giusberti & Carnevale in Calzoni et al.	Early Eocene (Ypresian)	Chiusole Formation	Italy	A member of the family Dussumieriidae. The type species is L. renga.	
Limnodapalis	Gen. et sp. nov	Valid	Ahnelt & Bradić-Milinović in Ahnelt, Winkler & Bradić-Milinović	Oligocene		Serbia	A member of the family Ambassidae. The type species is L. insolitus.	
Mesonichthys culmensis	Sp. nov		Henderson & Giles	Carboniferous	Bude Formation	United Kingdom	An early ray-finned fish.	
Mictlanichthys	Gen. et sp. nov		Villeda-Ruiz, Alvarado-Ortega & Pérez-Rodríguez	Late Cretaceous (Turonian)		Mexico	A member of Crossognathiformes. The type species is M. garibayi.	
Nazaria	Gen. et sp. nov		Richter et al.	Permian (Cisuralian)	Pedra do Fogo Formation	Brazil	A deep-bodied ray-finned fish related to Blourugia and Paranaichthys. Genus includes new species N. limnica.	
Neodapalis	Gen. et sp. nov	Valid	Bradić-Milinović, Schwarzhans & He	Miocene (Serravallian)	Valjevo-Mionica Basin	Serbia	A member of the family Ambassidae. The type species is N. haraldahnelti.	
Nusaviichthys antigonae	Sp. nov		Lupercio-Espericueta & Alvarado-Ortega	Early Cretaceous (Albian)	Tlayúa Formation	Mexico	A member of Crossognathiformes.	
Orthocormus gushchinae	Sp. nov		Kanarkina, Zverkov & Varenov	Late Jurassic		Russia		
Ostenolepis	Gen. et sp. nov	Valid	Franceschi, Marramà & Carnevale	Early Jurassic (Sinemurian)	Moltrasio Formation	Italy	A member of Palaeoniscimorpha. The type species is O. marianii.	
Paleohoplias amazonensis	Sp. nov		Decat et al.	Miocene	Solimões Formation	Brazil	A member of the family Erythrinidae.	
Paralbula carlae	Sp. nov		Pimentel et al.	Late Cretaceous (Campanian-Maastrichtian)		Portugal	A member of Elopiformes belonging to the family Phyllodontidae.	
Paraorthocormus	Gen. et comb. nov		Kanarkina, Zverkov & Varenov	Middle Jurassic (Callovian)	Oxford Clay Formation	United Kingdom	A member of Pachycormiformes belonging to the family Protosphyraenidae. The type species is "Hypsocormus" tenuirostris Woodward (1889)	
Parapristigenys	Gen. et sp. nov	Valid	Bannikov & Carnevale	Eocene (Bartonian)	Kuma Formation	Russia (Krasnodar Krai)	A member of the family Priacanthidae. Genus includes new species P. marramai.	
Parastylephorus	Gen. et sp. nov	Valid	Ridolfi et al.	Eocene	Pabdeh Formation	Iran	A member of the family Stylephoridae. The type species is P. anatoides.	
Parkeichthys	Gen. et sp. nov	Valid	Shen	Carboniferous	Staunton Formation	United States (Indiana)	An early ray-finned fish, possibly a member of the new group Permocarbonimorpha. The type species is P. richardsoni.	
Peripeltopleurus jurassicus	Sp. nov	Valid	Franceschi, Marramà & Carnevale	Early Jurassic (Sinemurian)	Moltrasio Formation	Italy		
Pholidolepis teruzzii	Sp. nov	Valid	Franceschi, Marramà & Carnevale	Early Jurassic (Sinemurian)	Moltrasio Formation	Italy		
Placopleurus evelynae	Sp. nov		Conedera et al.	Middle Triassic (Anisian)		Italy		
Placopleurus seidli	Sp. nov		Conedera et al.	Middle Triassic (Anisian)		Slovenia		
Placopleurus taibonensis	Sp. nov		Conedera et al.	Middle Triassic (Ladinian)		Italy		
Placopleurus verbanensis	Sp. nov		Conedera et al.	Middle Triassic (Ladinian)		Italy		
Placopleurus zmelkooworum	Sp. nov		Conedera et al.	Middle Triassic (Anisian)		Slovenia		
Priacanthus pellegrinoi	Sp. nov	Valid	Bannikov & Carnevale	Eocene (Bartonian)	Kuma Formation	Russia (Krasnodar Krai)	A species of Priacanthus.	
Pteronisculus luopingensis	Sp. nov	Valid	Ren & Xu	Middle Triassic (Anisian)	Guanling Formation	China		
Ptycholepis huoae	Sp. nov	Valid	Xu et al.	Middle Triassic (Anisian)	Guanling Formation	China		
Rumsichthys	Gen. et sp. nov		Murray et al.	Late Cretaceous (Maastrichtian)	Scollard Formation	Canada (Alberta)	A member of Percomorpha of uncertain affinities. Genus includes new species R. novaspinus.	
Sabbathichthys	Sp. nov	Valid	Calzoni, Giusberti & Carnevale in Calzoni et al.	Early Eocene (Ypresian)	Chiusole Formation	Italy	A member of the family Phosichthyidae. The type species is S. osbournei.	
Sauropsis calloviensis	Sp. nov	Valid	Cooper	Middle Jurassic (Callovian)	Oxford Clay	United Kingdom		
Sinamia meemanniana	Sp. nov	Valid	Liu & Zhang	Early Cretaceous	Dalazi Formation	China		
Spirinchus izumoensis	Sp. nov	Valid	Hamada et al.	Miocene	Kawai Formation	Japan	A species of Spirinchus.	
Stephaniella	Gen. et sp. nov		Gonçalves, Pouzadoux & Luccisano	Carboniferous (Gzhelian)		France	An aeduellid. Genus includes new species S. melanocephala.	
Tatarstanichthys	Gen. et sp. nov	Valid	Taverne & Capasso	Permian		Russia (Tatarstan)	A member of Bobasatraniiformes. The type species is T. bannikovi.	
Thoracopterus polzbergensis	Sp. nov	Valid	Tintori, Conedera & Lukeneder	Late Triassic (Carnian)	Reingrabener Schiefer	Austria		
Thyrsitoides cangrandei	Sp. nov	Valid	Calzoni, Giusberti & Carnevale in Calzoni et al.	Early Eocene (Ypresian)	Chiusole Formation	Italy	A member of the family Gempylidae; a species of Thyrsitoides.	
Unionichthys	Gen. et sp. nov		Henderson & Giles	Carboniferous	Pennine Lower Coal Measures Formation	United Kingdom	An early ray-finned fish. The type species is U. friedmani.	
Uylyakushlyukia	Gen. et sp. nov	Valid	Bannikov	Eocene (Ypresian)	Danata Formation	Turkmenistan	A probable stromateoid. Genus includes new species U. danatensis.	
Valgarzaella	Gen. et sp. nov	Valid	Capasso et al.	Late Triassic (Norian)		Italy	A member of Gyrodontiformes. Genus includes new species V. antiquissima.	
Veronaphleges ambrosii	Sp. nov	Valid	Calzoni, Giusberti & Carnevale in Calzoni et al.	Early Eocene (Ypresian)	Chiusole Formation	Italy	A member of the family Euzaphlegidae; a species of Veronaphleges.	
Wadiichthys	Gen. et sp. nov	Valid	Abu El-Kheir et al.	Late Cretaceous (Maastrichtian)	Dakhla Formation	Egypt	A member of the family Saurodontidae. Genus includes new species W. anbaawyi.	
Yucypris	Gen. et sp. nov		Chen et al.	Eocene	Hetaoyuan Formation	China	A member of the family Cyprinidae. Genus includes new species Y. nanxiangensis.	
Zangerlichthys	Gen. et sp. nov	Valid	Shen	Carboniferous	Staunton Formation	United States (Indiana)	An early ray-finned fish, possibly a member of the new group Permocarbonimorpha. The type species is Z. scutatus.	
Zealandorhynchus	Gen. et sp. nov		Rust et al.	Eocene	Kurinui Formation	New Zealand	A billfish. The type species is Z. fordycei. Announced in 2025; the final article version was published in 2026.	

=== Otolith taxa ===
Name	Novelty	Status	Authors	Age	Type locality	Location	Notes	Images
"Albula" aqualis	Sp. nov	Valid	Stringer et al.	Paleocene	Aquia Formation	United States (Maryland)	A bonefish of uncertain generic placement.	
Artediellus iutlandicus	Sp. nov	Valid	Schwarzhans et al.	Oligocene	Brejning Formation	Denmark; Germany	A species of Artediellus.	
Benthosema rarang	Sp. nov	Valid	Mediodia & Lin in Mediodia et al.	Pliocene		Philippines	A species of Benthosema.	
Centropomus neildouglasi	Sp. nov	Valid	Stringer et al.	Paleocene	Aquia Formation	United States (Maryland)	A species of Centropomus.	
Coelorinchus ignotus	Sp. nov	Valid	Schwarzhans et al.	Oligocene	Brejning Formation	Denmark	A species of Coelorinchus.	
Dapalis bradicae	Sp. nov	Valid	Schwarzhans et al.	Oligocene		Germany	A member of the family Ambassidae.	
Diancistrus kasei	Sp. nov	Valid	Schwarzhans et al.	Pliocene	Tartaro Formation	Philippines	A species of Diancistrus.	
Enchelyopus dybkjaerae	Sp. nov	Valid	Schwarzhans et al.	Oligocene	Brejning Formation	Denmark	A species of Enchelyopus.	
Eomupus	Gen. et comb. nov	Valid	Schwarzhans et al.	Eocene to Miocene		Denmark; France; Germany; United Kingdom	A medusafish. The type species is "Mupus" neumanni Schwarzhans (1974); genus also includes "Scombrops" sinuosus Stinton (1965).	
Hoplobrotuloides similisbartonensis	Sp. nov	Valid	Stringer et al.	Paleocene	Aquia Formation	United States (Maryland)	A cusk-eel.	
Lampanyctus morsensis	Sp. nov	Valid	Schwarzhans et al.	Oligocene	Brejning Formation	Denmark	A species of Lampanyctus.	
Lampanyctus vilsundensis	Sp. nov	Valid	Schwarzhans et al.	Oligocene		Denmark	A species of Lampanyctus.	
Lophiodes sliwinskae	Sp. nov	Valid	Schwarzhans et al.	Oligocene	Brejning Formation	Denmark	A species of Lophiodes.	
Macquaria pundalpa	Sp. nov	Valid	Schwarzhans		Namba Formation	Australia	A species of Macquaria.	
Mareperca	Gen. et comb. nov	Valid	Stringer et al.	Paleocene	Aquia Formation	United States (Maryland)	A member of the family Serranidae. Genus includes M. remensis.	
Myctophum luzonicum	Sp. nov	Valid	Mediodia & Lin in Mediodia et al.	Pliocene		Philippines	A species of Myctophum.	
Myoxocephalus aculeatus	Sp. nov	Valid	Schwarzhans et al.	Oligocene	Brejning Formation	Denmark	A species of Myoxocephalus.	
Nomeus sternbergensis	Sp. nov	Valid	Schwarzhans et al.	Oligocene		Germany	A species of Nomeus.	
Palaeoesox scandicus	Sp. nov	Valid	Schwarzhans et al.	Oligocene	Brejning Formation	Denmark	A member of the family Umbridae.	
Palaeomorrhua longus	Sp. nov	Valid	Stringer et al.	Paleocene	Aquia Formation	United States (Maryland)	A member of Gadiformes belonging to the family Phycidae.	
Palimphemus pinguis	Sp. nov	Valid	Schwarzhans et al.	Oligocene	Brejning Formation	Denmark	A member of the family Gadidae.	
Parambassis? pipperrae	Sp. nov	Valid	Gegg & Reichenbacher	Miocene (Burdigalian)	Kirchberg Formation	Germany	Possibly a species of Parambassis.	
Paraulopus superstitius	Sp. nov	Valid	Schwarzhans et al.	Oligocene		Germany	A species of Paraulopus.	
Platysepta compactus	Sp. nov	Valid	Stringer et al.	Paleocene	Aquia Formation	United States (Maryland)	A member of Osteichthyes of uncertain familial placement.	
Primitivusscomber	Gen. et sp. nov	Valid	Stringer et al.	Paleocene	Aquia Formation	United States (Maryland)	A member of the family Scombridae. Genus includes new species P. triangulum.	
Sardinella mecklenburgensis	Sp. nov	Valid	Schwarzhans et al.	Oligocene		Germany	A species of Sardinella.	
Trisopterus brevicollum	Sp. nov	Valid	Gaemers & Schwarzhans in Schwarzhans et al.	Oligocene		Denmark; Germany	A species of Trisopterus.	
Trisopterus cylindratus	Sp. nov	Valid	Gaemers & Schwarzhans in Schwarzhans et al.	Oligocene		Germany	A species of Trisopterus.	
Trisopterus weileri	Sp. nov	Valid	Gaemers & Schwarzhans in Schwarzhans et al.	Oligocene		Denmark; Germany	A species of Trisopterus.	
Ungusurculus phasmaticus	Sp. nov	Valid	Schwarzhans et al.	Pliocene	Tartaro Formation	Philippines	A species of Ungusurculus.	

=== Ray-finned fish research ===
- Review of the fossil record and evolutionary history of early ray-finned fishes is published by Stack (2026).
- Evidence from the study of endocasts of extant ray-finned fishes, indicating that endocasts are not reliable predictors of morphology of brains in extinct fishes, is presented by Figueroa & Pierce (2026).
- Vanhaesebroucke & Cloutier (2026) study the morphological variation among Devonian and Carboniferous ray-finned fishes, and interpret their diversification as most likely driven by adaptations to diverse feeding strategies.
- Caron, Tietjen & Coates (2026) provide new information on the neuroanatomy of Trawdenia planti, reporting evidence of presence of a large brain and phylogenetically informative characters in the endocast.
- A revision of the aeduellid Puertollanichthys ritchiei from the early Gzhelian Puertollano Formation (Spain) is published by Gonçalves et al. (2026).
- Gonçalves (2026) describe a new occurrence of the aeduellid Aeduella blainvillei from the Gzhelian Saint-Pierre-la-Cour Formation (Armorican Massif, France).
- Fragmentary fossils interpreted as evidence of presence of ray-finned fishes with body length exceeding 1 meter in the North American Phosphoria Sea during the early Permian are reported from the Phosphoria Formation and Minnekahta Formation (Idaho and South Dakota, United States) by Stack (2026).
- Murray et al. (2026) report the discovery of fossil material of bichirs from the Maastrichtian Maevarano Formation (Madagascar), representing the first known record of the group outside of South America and continental Africa.
- Evidence from the study of the anatomy of Polypterus faraou interpreted as indicative of air-breathing capability is presented by Coelho et al. (2026).
- Zhang et al. (2026) report the first fossil evidence of presence of Saurichthys in the Early Triassic Nanzhang-Yuan'an fauna (China).
- Tintori et al. (2026) provide an updated morphological description of Saurichthys majiashanensis.
- Quinn et al. (2026) revise purported fossil material of "Severnichthys" acuminatus from the Upper Triassic (Rhaetian) strata of the Westbury Formation (Penarth Group; United Kingdom), describe a new saurichthyiform rostrum from the same strata, and interpret the studied fossil material as belonging to two distinct taxa: Saurichthys sp. and Birgeria acuminata.
- Friedman & Giles (2026) study the cranial anatomy of Chondrosteus acipenseroides and reevaluate purported anatomical evidence of affinities of fishes such as saurichthyiforms, Birgeria, Errolichthys, coccolepidids and Eochondrosteus with Acipenseriformes, finding no compelling evidence for placement of taxa other than chondrosteids in the acipenseriform stem group.
- Evidence from the study of abundance and contents of coprolites from the Kanguk Formation (Devon Island, Nunavut, Canada) and from the study of distribution of sturgeons and other taxa known from the Devon Island during the Cretaceous, interpreted as suggestive of migrations of sturgeons in the Arctic driven by seasonal planktonic blooms during the Late Cretaceous, is presented by Duffy et al. (2026).
- Giordano, Benavente & Martínez Palacio (2026) describe pseudobeaconiid fossil material representing the first vertebrate record from the Middle Triassic Mollar Formation (Argentina) and possibly representing the oldest record of the family reported to date.
- Stack, Kligman & Stricklin (2026) provide new information on the anatomy of tubercles from the snout of Redfieldius gracilis, and interpret the studied structures as dermal odontodes that evolved independently from those seen in living fishes.
- Tintori et al. (2026) redescribe "Peltopleurus" orientalis on the basis of data from new fossil material from the Ladinian strata of the Falang Formation (China), and assign the studied species to the genus Habroichthys.
- Taxonomic revision and a study on the affinities of Macromesodon and Apomesodon is published by Ebert (2026).
- Cawley, Villalobos-Segura & Kriwet (2026) study the phylogenetic relationships of members of Coccodontoidea, and recover the group as monophyletic.
- Ebert & López-Arbarello (2026) revise members of the genus Ophiopsiella from the Jurassic Solnhofen Limestone (Germany), and interpret O. attenuata as a junior synonym of O. tenuiserrata.
- Unwin et al. (2026) argue that the holotype of purported pterosaur Bakiribu waridza is actually fossil material of an indeterminate ray-finned fish (possibly an amiid).
- Wilson et al. (2026) study the anatomy and affinities of a large gar specimen (the holotype of Atractosteus grandei) from the earliest Paleocene strata of the Fort Union Formation (North Dakota, United States), supporting its placement in the crown group of Lepisosteiformes and in the total group of the genus Atractosteus, and also cast doubt on its distinctiveness from Atractosteus simplex.
- Cooper & Maxwell (2026) redescribe Sauropsis longimana, interpret it as the sole species belonging to the genus Sauropsis, and transfer "Sauropsis" depressus to the genus Simocormus.
- Kanarkina et al. (2026) describe new pachycormiform fossil material from the Lower Cretaceous (Albian) Khadzhalmakhi Formation (Dagestan, Russia), sharing morphological similarities with Protosphyraena ferox and "Australopachycormus" hurleyi, and interpret "A." hurleyi as a species of Protosphyraena closely related to P. ferox, possibly even its junior synonym.
- Drumheller et al. (2026) report the discovery of a fish tooth embedded in a cervical vertebra of a specimen of Polycotylus latipinnis from the Cretaceous Mooreville Chalk (Alabama, United States), interpreted as likely evidence of an attack by Xiphactinus.
- Marramà & Carnevale (2026) revise the classification of extant and extinct members of Clupeomorpha, and name new taxa Clupeopsidae and Eollimmichthyinae.
- Veiga et al. (2026) consider Tharrhias castellanoi to be a nomen dubium, and assign its fossil material to Tharrhias cf. araripis.
- Yang et al. (2026) describe fossil material of an indeterminate cyprinid and an indeterminate member of Barbini from the Miocene strata of the Dingqing Formation (Lunpola Basin, Tibet, China), interpreted as indicative of greater diversity of cyprinids in the hinterland of the Qinghai–Tibet Plateau during the early–middle Miocene compared to the present.
- Panzeri et al. (2026) describe cranial anatomy of Arhinolemur scalabrinii, and interpret Megaleporinus as a junior synonym of Arhinolemur.
- Caron et al. (2026) report the discovery of fossil material of a member of the genus Yuskaichthys from the Paleocene Santa Lucía Formation (Bolivia), extending known geographic and temporal range ot the genus.
- Evidence of genetic discontinuities between Pleistocene and modern Iberian populations of the Atlantic salmon is reported from the study of ancient DNA from salmon vertebrae from El Mirón Cave (Spain) from the by García-Souto et al. (2026).
- Tennenbaum et al. (2026) identify microfossil teeth indistinguishable from those of extant members of the genus Cyclothone in the Eocene strata from Campbell Plateau south of New Zealand, representing the oldest record of the genus or its stem lineage reported to date.
- Fossil material of two members of the genus Enchodus (E. petrosus and E. cf. gladiolus), including the largest articulated skull of a member of the genus reported to date, is described from the Upper Cretaceous Bearpaw Formation (Alberta, Canada) by Nelson, Murray & Brinkman (2026).
- Calzoni et al. (2026) redescribe Omiodon cabassii and interpret is as a possible member of Chlorophthalmoidea.
- Bienkowska-Wasiluk, Radmacher & Head (2026) describe a lanternfish fossil from the Pliocene Monte Narbonne Formation (Sicily, Italy), providing evidence of survivable conditions in the mesopelagic zone in the studied area at the time of deposition.
- Redescription of the anatomy and a study on the affinities of Palaeocentrotus boggildi is published by Schrøder, Lindow & Carnevale (2026).
- Evidence from the study of cod otoliths from deep-sea sediments in the Arctic Ocean, indicative of presence of Arctogadus glacialis and Boreogadus saida in the central Arctic Ocean at 87–89 °N between 48,000 and 35,000 years ago, as well as indicative of presence of A. glacialis in refugia at 84–85 °N during the peak of the Last Glacial Maximum, is presented by Chawarski et al. (2026).
- A study on the phylogenetic relationships and evolutionary history of extant and extinct snakeheads is published by Murray & Holmes (2026).
- DeHaan, Slater & Friedman (2026) report evidence from experiments with a dataset of carangarian fishes indicative of utility of a posteriori insertion of fossils in the phylogenetic studies for improvement of inferences about rates of phenotypic evolution.
- Frank, Marshall & Bell (2026) reconstruct the chronology of the stickleback evolution on the basis of data from their fossil record.
- Santaquiteria et al. (2026) reconstruct the evolutionary history of Acanthuriformes on the basis of genomic data from extant species and morphological data from fossil ones, reporting evidence of at least seven independent origins of planktivory, as well as evidence of links of dietary shifts to both climate changes and lineage-specific evolutionary histories.
- Fossil material of a probable butterflyfish, representing the oldest record of the group reported to date, is described from the Eocene strata from the Monte Postale site (Monte Bolca Lagerstätte, Italy) by Bannikov, Zorzin & Carnevale (2026).
- The largest diodontid tooth plate batteries reported to date are described from the Pliocene Yorktown Formation on the continental shelf of Onslow Bay (North Carolina, United States) by Maisch et al. (2026).
- The first fossil record of Arothron sp. is reported from the Pleistocene strata of the Liuchungchi Formation (Taiwan) by Lee et al. (2026).
- Yadav et al. (2026) study the composition of the Late Cretaceous fish assemblages from the Deccan intertrappean localities Bhagwania, Mohanpura and Kesavi (India), interpreted as indicative of freshwater environment with possible episodic marine or brackish-water influences.
- A new, diverse fish assemblage, dominated by percomorphs which are represented by at least eight taxa and including the oldest confirmed representatives of Veliferidae, Syngnathidae, Scombridae, Trichuroidea, Carangidae and Menidae reported to date, is described from the Paleocene (Danian) strata from the Qreiya 3 Lagerstätte (Dakhla Formation; Egypt) by El-Sayed et al. (2026).
- Ball et al. (2026) report evidence indicating that stable isotope compositions of extant fish otoliths reflect their ecophysiological niches, and reconstruct thermal and metabolic niches of members of the Eocene fish assemblage from the London Clay (United Kingdom) on the basis of the study of their otoliths.
- Kovalchuk et al (2026) document the paleofauna of a Middle Miocene-aged locality in Rivne Oblast, Ukraine, identifying 5 genera and 3 families of ray-finned fish, and finding evidence that it represented a marginal freshwater habitat on the outskirts of the Forecarpathian Basin.
- Ballen et al. (2026) describe fish fossils from the Pliocene strata of the Sincelejo and Ware formations (Colombia), including fossils of members of lineages with extant representatives restricted to drainages east of the Andes.
- Singh et al. (2026) report the first discovery of freshwater fish otoliths from the upper Pliocene strata of the Mohand section of Siwaliks (Uttar Pradesh, India).
- A study on the composition of the late Early Pleistocene freshwater fish assemblage from the Aalat Formation (Eritrea) is published by Pagliuzzi et al. (2026).
- Hashimoto et al. (2026) describe fossil material of Lateolabrax cf. japonicus and Mugil sp. from the Saginota Formation (Japan), interpreted as indicative of presence of a brackish environment with intermittent marine inflow during the Middle Pleistocene.
- Evidence from the study of the fossil record of otoliths from the Erchiu and Cholan formations (Taiwan), indicative of presence of distinct Miocene, Pliocene and Pleistocene teleost assemblages and of community restructuring through gradual taxonomic replacement, is presented by Lin et al. (2026).

== Lobe-finned fishes ==
Name	Novelty	Status	Authors	Age	Type locality	Location	Notes	Images
Aemilia	Gen. et sp. nov	Junior homonym	Mondéjar Fernández et al.	Carboniferous (Gzhelian)	Graham Formation	United States (Texas)	A coelacanth. The type species is A. stellata. The generic name is preoccupied by Aemilia Kirby (1892).	
Amazinyomakhulu	Gen. et sp. nov		Gess & Ahlberg	Devonian (Famennian)	Witpoort Formation	South Africa	A member of the family Onychodontidae. The type species is A. mallinsonia.	
Asperideceratodus	Gen. et sp. nov	Valid	Barbosa et al.	Late Jurassic	Aliança Formation	Brazil	A lungfish. Genus includes new species A. marisae.	
Ceratodus ibimiriensis	Sp. nov	Valid	Barbosa et al.	Late Jurassic	Aliança Formation	Brazil	A lungfish.	
Eusthenodon mesingw	Sp. nov		Downs et al.	Devonian (Famennian)	Catskill Formation	United States (Pennsylvania)		
Ferganoceratodus cabreirai	Sp. nov		Quezado et al.	Late Triassic (Carnian)	Santa Maria Formation	Brazil	A lungfish.	
Jumisodus	Gen. et sp. nov	Valid	Clement et al.	Devonian (Famennian)	Ketleri Formation	Latvia	A lungfish. The type species is J. latus.	
Loreleia	Gen. et sp. nov		Manuelli et al.	Middle Triassic	Calcaire à Cératites Formation	France	A coelacanth belonging to the group Latimerioidei. The type species is L. eucingulata.	
Macropoma gombessae	Sp. nov		Norton et al.	Early Cretaceous (Albian)	Gault Formation	United Kingdom	A latimeriid coelacanth.	
Ptychoceratodus eliseui	Sp. nov		Quezado et al.	Late Triassic (Carnian)	Santa Maria Formation	Brazil	A lungfish.	
Sinoceratodus	Gen. et sp. nov		Luo et al.	Early Jurassic (Sinemurian)	Ziliujing Formation	China	A lungfish belonging to the group Ceratodontoidei. The type species is S. fortunus.	
Talentichthys	Gen. et sp. nov		Young & Lu	Devonian	Shogrãm Formation	Pakistan	A lungfish belonging to the family Holodontidae. The type species is T. kuragh.	
Tekoaceratodus	Gen. et sp. nov	Valid	Barbosa et al.	Late Jurassic	Aliança Formation	Brazil	A lungfish. Genus includes new species T. pernambucensis.	

=== Lobe-finned fish research ===
- Gouiric-Cavalli et al. (2026) report the discovery of new actinistian material from the Carboniferous (Pennsylvanian) strata from the San Juan Province (Argentina), representing the oldest record of the group in southwestern Gondwana reported to date.
- Evidence of preservation of internal bone tissues as tubular structures in bone fragments of Mawsonia from the Lower Cretaceous Quiricó Formation (Brazil) is presented by Rodrigues et al. (2026).
- A study on the articulation between the palatoquadrate and the neurocranium in Youngolepis, Diabolepis and Paleolophus, providing evidence of stepwise evolution of lungfish cranial organization that was likely driven by biomechanical demands associated with durophagy, is published by Qiao et al. (2026).
- Redescription of the anatomy and a study on the affinities of Sorbitorhynchus deleaskitus is published by Li et al. (2026).
- Thiele et al. (2026) revise the fossil material of Cainocara enigma, and interpret it as a lungfish and a probable nomen dubium.
- Branigan et al. (2026) study the histology of pectoral fin bones in Glyptolepis groenlandica and reconstruct their ossification patterns.
- Evidence of morphological variability of dental plates of Gnathorhiza sp. from the Permian Corumbataí Formation (Brazil), interpreted as most likely resulting from high phenotypic plasticity of the studied population, is published by Lacerda et al. (2026).
- Pawlak et al. (2026) identify lungfish aestivation burrows in the Triassic strata of the Ørsted Dal Formation (Greenland), interpreted as indicative of a seasonally dry climate in the studied area during the late Norian.
- Pawlak et al. (2026) describe fossil material of Ptychoceratodus sp. from the Upper Triassic Klettgau Formation (Switzetland) and reevaluate patterns of distribution of Late Triassic lungfishes from northwestern Pangaea, reporting evidence of latitudinal pattern of distribution of Ptychoceratodus and Arganodus, and linking the distribution of Ceratodus to the proximity of saline water.
- Clement et al. (2026) study the morphological diversity of cranial endocasts of early members of Tetrapodomorpha, and report evidence of distinctive morphology of tristichopterids, megalichthyids and osteolepidids.
- A new osteolepidid specimen with morphological similarities to Thursius wudingensis is described from the Devonian Xichong Formation (Yunnan, China) by Pu, Wang & Lu (2026).
- Leong & Liu (2026) interpret Tinirau clackae as a member of the family Tristichopteridae, and interpret Bruehnopteron murphyi as a junior synonym of T. clackae.
- Redescription of the anatomy and a study on the affinities of Koharalepis jarviki is published by Mensforth et al. (2026).
- Redescription of Megalichthys pygmaeus, based on data from new fossil material from the Carboniferous Scottish Lower Coal Measures Formation (United Kingdom), is published by Elliott (2026).
- Mo et al. (2026) describe probable elpistostegalian pectoral fin material from the Devonian (Frasnian) Fram Formation (Nunavut, Canada), expanding known morphological diversity of tetrapodomorph fins.

== Other fishes ==
Name	Novelty	Status	Authors	Age	Type locality	Location	Notes	Images
Eosteus	Gen. et sp. nov	Valid	Zhu et al.	Silurian (Telychian)	Huixingshao Formation	China	An early bony fish. The type species is E. chongqingensis.	

=== Other fish research ===
- Fritzsch & Cavin (2026) compare the anatomy of Palaeospondylus with those of other jawed vertebrates, as argue that it might be a member of a previously unrecognized lineage.
- Lu et al. (2026) report the discovery of new fossil material of Megamastax amblyodus providing new information on its anatomy, compare it with fossil material of Lophosteus and Andreolepis, and interpret the three taxa as likely stem-bony fishes.
- Schultze, Arratia & Shen (2026) study the anatomy and affinities of Dialipina salgueiroensis, interpreting it as a basal member of Osteichthyes.

== General research ==
- Evidence from the study of the fossil record of early to mid-Paleozoic fishes, interpreted as indicative of diversification of jawed vertebrates and their close jawless relatives in isolated refugia in the aftermath of the Late Ordovician mass extinction, is presented by Hagiwara & Sallan (2026).
- Cirtina et al. (2026) study the diversity and evolution of melanosomes in eyes, skin and internal tissues of extant and extinct fishes, reporting evidence of tissue- and lineage-specific variation.
- Evidence of variable patterns of extinction selectivity of early fishes from the Silurian to the Carboniferous, including a phylogenetically clustered (affecting close relatives at the same time) extinction of jawless fishes during the Silurian-Devonian transition, clustered extinctions of several fish groups during the Late Devonian and a shift to non-clustered extinctions during the Carboniferous, is presented by Flannery-Sutherland et al. (2026).
- Cai et al. (2026) determine that late Silurian fish from the Kuanti Formation (Yunnan, China) lived in a nearshore marine environment with humid tropical climatic conditions.
- Shan et al. (2026) study the histology of the dermal skeleton of Moythomasia durgaringa and evaluate the distribution of cosmine-related characters in bony fishes, reporting evidence of sparse distribution of characters associated with cosmine among early bony fishes and evidence of presence of true cosmine only in Rhipidistia.
- Xian et al. (2026) report the discovery of a new vertebrate site in the Devonian (Pragian) strata of the Posongchong Formation (Yunnan, China), preserving fossil material of galeaspids, antiarchs, petalichthyids and sarcopterygians.
- Jobbins et al. (2026) study the composition of the fish (placoderm and sarcopterygian) assemblage from the Devonian (Eifelian) Elm Point Formation (Manitoba, Canada), and identify a possible osteolepiform postparietal shield representing the oldest record of a tetrapodomorph from Canada reported to date.
- Coprolites likely produced by lobe-finned fishes similar to Eusthenopteron, Laccognathus and Glyptolepis, preserving remains of acanthodians, holoptychiids and lungfish from multiple trophic levels, are described from the Devonian (Givetian-Frasnian transition) Kumushka Formation (Nenets Autonomous Okrug, Russia) by Rebillard et al. (2026).
- Gonçalves et al. (2026) study the composition of the Carboniferous (late Moscovian) fish assemblage from the Vaulnaveys-le-Bas locality (France), including the oldest occurrence of Aeduellidae, and interpret the studied assemblage as fossil evidence of faunal transition at the end of the Westphalian.
- Gonçalves et al. (2026) describe new acanthodid, hybodontiform and actinopterygian fossil material from the Permian (Asselian) strata of the Cantemerle Formation (France), providing new information on the anatomy and affinities of Progyrolepis.
- Schwarzhans & Brandt (2026) study the composition of the assemblage of otoliths and other fish fossils from the Permian strata from the Kupferschiefer (Germany), providing new information on the morphological diversity of otoliths of late Permian fishes.
- Karapunar et al. (2026) report the discovery of new fossil material of marine vertebrates from the Permian and Triassic strata of the Bellerophon and Werfen formations (Italy), including the youngest Paleozoic occurrence of Bobasatrania providing evidence that its geographical range included both equatorial and mid-latitudes before the Permian–Triassic extinction event, and interpret the fossil record as suggestive of decline in diversity of marine fishes in shallow tropical waters of western Paleo-Tethys Ocean during the extinction interval.
- Ralhan et al. (2026) study the composition of the fish-dominated vertebrate assemblage from the Rhaetian strata of the Westbury Formation at the Carrefour Hypermarket site (Patchway, near Bristol, United Kingdom).
- A study on the composition of the fish assemblage from the Callovian strata from the Vaches Noires cliffs (Normandy, France) is published by Beaufils et al. (2026).
- A study on the composition and ecological characteristics of Aptian−Albian fish assemblages from the Romualdo Formation (Brazil) is published by Lopes et al. (2026).
- Salih et al. (2026) describe hybodontiform, nurse shark and pycnodontid fossil material associated with the crocodyliform Brachiosuchus kababishensis from the Upper Cretaceous Kababish Formation (Sudan).
- Comans, Tobin & Totten (2026) reconstruct the thermoregulatory modes of marine predatory fishes from the Smoky Hill Chalk Member of the Niobrara Formation (Kansas, United States) on the basis stable oxygen isotope composition of tooth enameloid, interpreted as consistent with ectothermy of the majority of the studied taxa, but suggestive of elevated body temperatures consistent with endothermy in Cretoxyrhina, Ptychodus and Xiphactinus.
- Crothers et al. (2026) study the composition of a diverse, actinopterygian-dominated fish assemblage from the ReBecca's Hollow locality from the Upper Cretaceous Williams Fork Formation (Colorado, United States), different from contemporary assemblages from higher latitudes and interpreted as indicative of provincialism of fish assemblages from Laramidia dating to the Campanian-Maastrichtian transition.
- López-Galán, Ferrón & Botella (2026) study ecomorphological variation of filter-feeding pachycormiforms, selachians and extant and extinct cetaceans, interpreting members of the three groups as repeatedly converging toward analogous functional designs, but also interpreting their convergent evolution as influenced by lineage-specific constraints.
- A new middle Miocene fish assemblage, interpreted as living in a marginal marine environment, is reported from the Pidhaitsi site (Ukraine) by Dubikovska et al. (2026).
- Sibert et al. (2026) provide an updated coding system for morphological characters of microfossil fish teeth, covering the morphological diversity seen in over 800 extant fish species and in the fossil record.
