= Erquitaia =

Scientific classification
- Kingdom: Animalia
- Phylum: Chordata
- Class: Chondrichthyes
- Subclass: Elasmobranchii
- Division: Selachii
- Superorder: Galeomorphi
- Family: incertae sedis
- Genus: †Erquitaia; Cappetta, 1989

Genus of sharks

Erquitaia is a poorly known genus of prehistoric galeomorph shark whose fossils are found in rocks dating from the Maastrichtian stage.

== Classification ==
Erquitaia was originally described by Henri Cappetta in 1989. It was thought to be a ray and was placed in the order Rajiformes. In 2002, Jack Sepkoski moved it into the shark super order Galeomorphi, which includes all modern sharks except the dogfish and their relatives.

== See also ==
- List of vertebrate fauna of the Maastrichtian stage
- List of prehistoric cartilaginous fish genera
