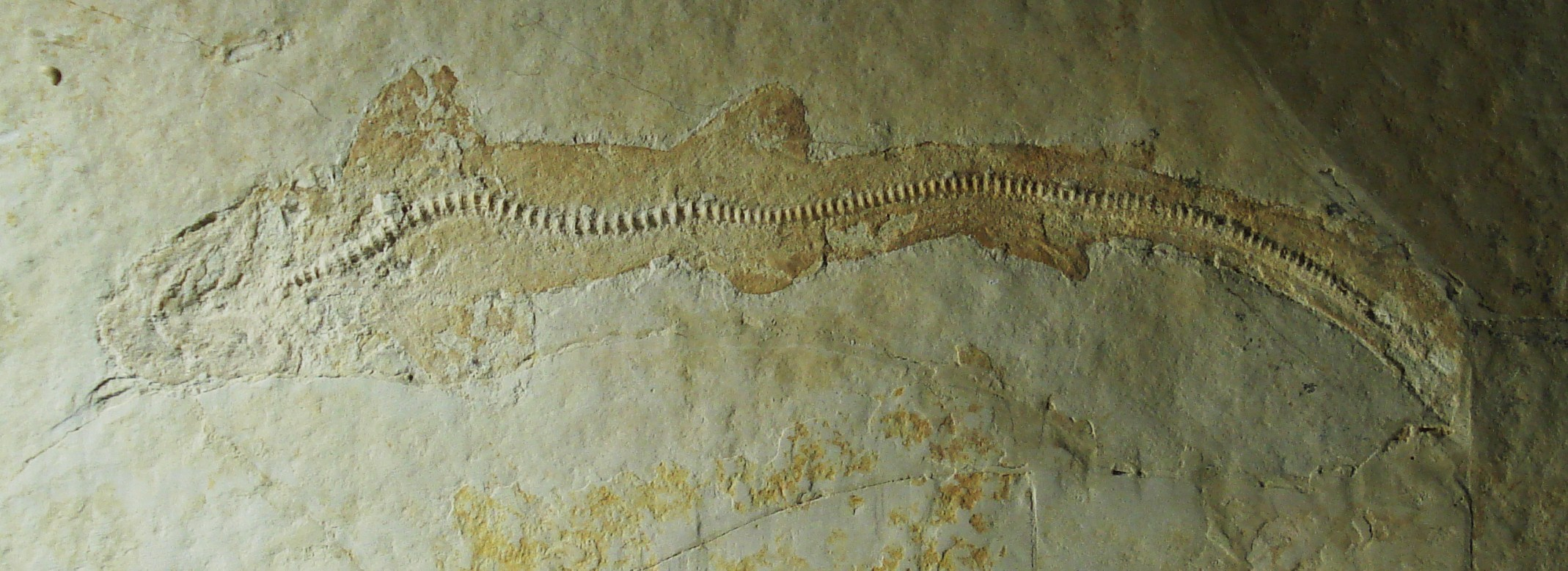
- Macrourogaleus hassei

Scientific classification
- Kingdom: Animalia
- Phylum: Chordata
- Class: Chondrichthyes
- Subclass: Elasmobranchii
- Family: †Paraorthacodontidae
- Genus: †Macrourogaleus; Fowler, 1947

= Macrourogaleus =

Macrourogaleus Temporal range: Late Jurassic

Genus of sharks

Macrourogaleus is a genus of shark from the Late Jurassic Solnhofen Limestone. It is closely related to Paraorthacodus, and placed in the same family Paraorthacodontidae, (though both genera were formerly placed in Palaeospinacidae) The body is slender, with a single dorsal fin and a elongate caudal fin. The anal fin is also very elongate. The pectoral and pelvic fins are noticeably rounded.
