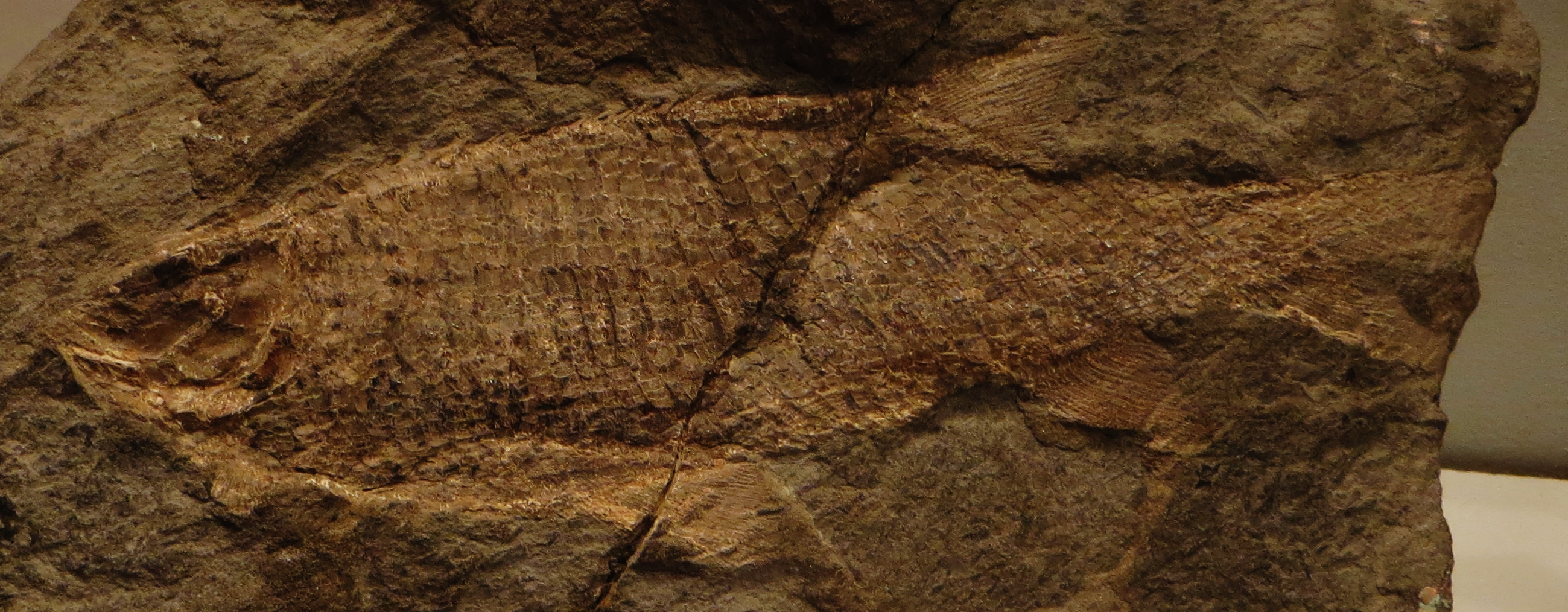
- Bourbonnella sottyi fossil

Scientific classification
- Domain: Eukaryota
- Kingdom: Animalia
- Phylum: Chordata
- Class: Actinopterygii
- Order: †Aeduelliformes
- Family: †Aeduellidae
- Genus: †Bourbonnella; Heyler, 1967

Type species
- †Bourbonnella guilloti Heyler 1967

Species
- See text

= Bourbonnella =

Bourbonnella Temporal range: early Pennsylvanian-Sakmarian

Extinct genus of fishes

Bourbonnella is an extinct genus of prehistoric freshwater and coastal marine ray-finned fish that lived during the late Mississippian (Carboniferous) and Asselian (Cisuralian/early Permian epoch) in what is now Burgundy (Autun, France), the Czech Republik (Boskovice Graben), and Utah (United States), with other remains known from elsewhere. The genus was named by Daniel Heyler in 1967.

It contains the following species:

- †B. fourrieri Poplin, 2001 - Late Pennsylvanian (Stephanian) of France
- †B. guilloti Heyler, 1967 - Early Permian (Asselian) of France
- †B. hirsuta Štamberg, 2007 - Early Permian (Sakmarian) of the Czech Republic
- †B. jocelynae Mickle, 2011 - Early Pennsylvanian (Bashkirian) of the United States (Utah)
- †B. sottyi Anonymous, 1972 - Late Pennsylvanian (Stephanian) of France

Indeterminate remains are known from the Carboniferous of the US (New Mexico) and Spain. Specimens from Germany were found in 2001 to belong to Aeduella.

The species B. jocelynae is the earliest known representative of the family Aeduellidae.

== See also ==
- Prehistoric fish
- List of prehistoric bony fish
