= Palaeospinax =

Palaeospinax Temporal range: Late Triassic–Early Jurassic

Scientific classification
- Kingdom: Animalia
- Phylum: Chordata
- Class: Chondrichthyes
- Subclass: Elasmobranchii
- Order: †Synechodontiformes
- Family: †Palaeospinacidae
- Genus: †Palaeospinax; Egerton, 1872

Type species
- †Paleospinax priscus Agassiz 1843

Species
- †Palaeospinax priscus

Synonyms
- †Paleospinax; †Synechodus Woodward, 1888

Extinct genus of cartilaginous fishes

Palaeospinax is an extinct genus of synechodontiform cartilaginous fish. Although several species have been described, the genus is considered nomen dubium because the type-specimen of the type species, Palaeospinax priscus, from the Late Triassic-Early Jurassic of Europe lacks appropriate diagnostic characters to define the genus.

Other species originally described as Synechodus were transferred to the genus Palidiplospinax.
