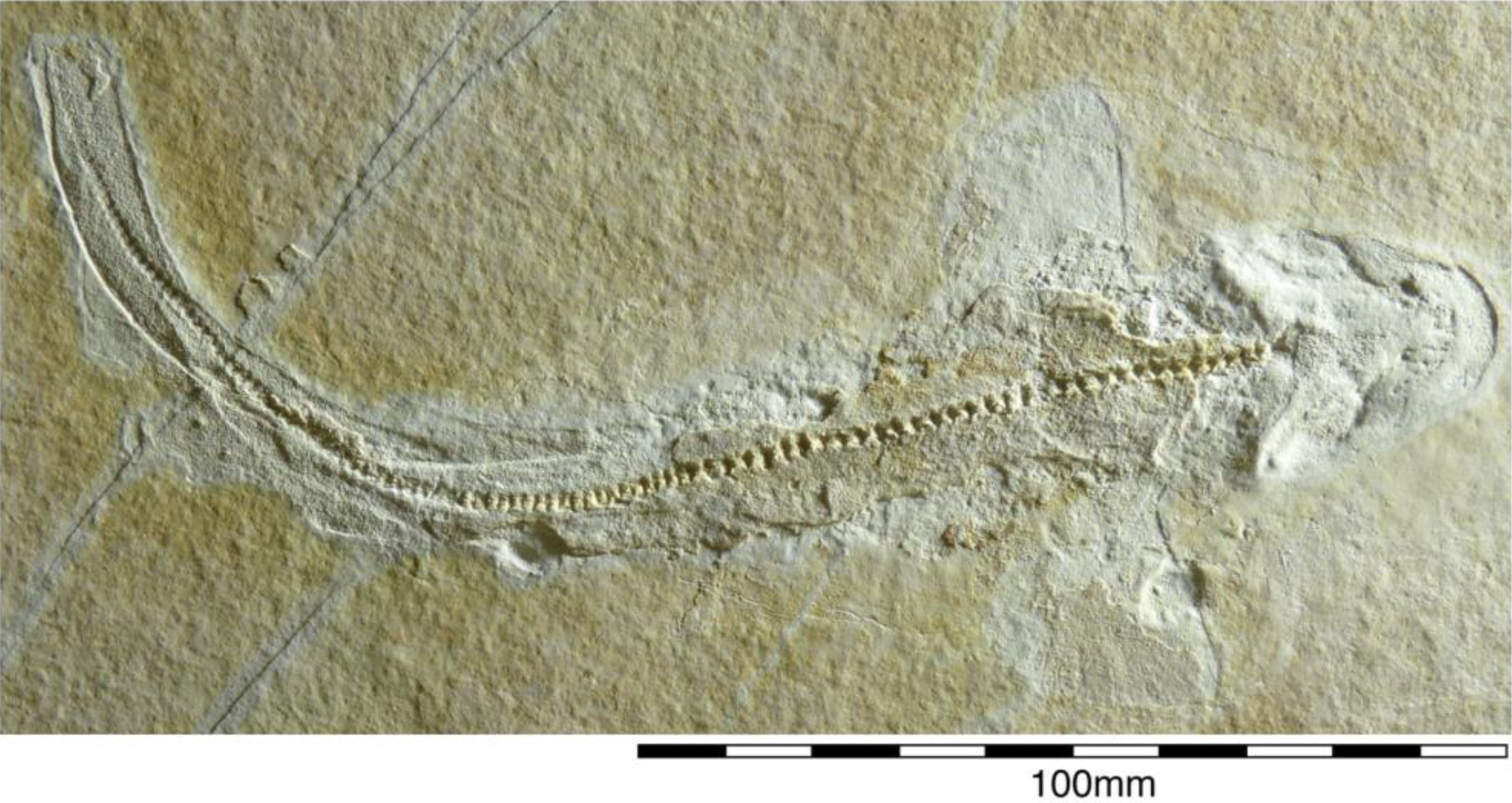
- Fossil of Synechodus ungeri from the Late Jurassic of Germany
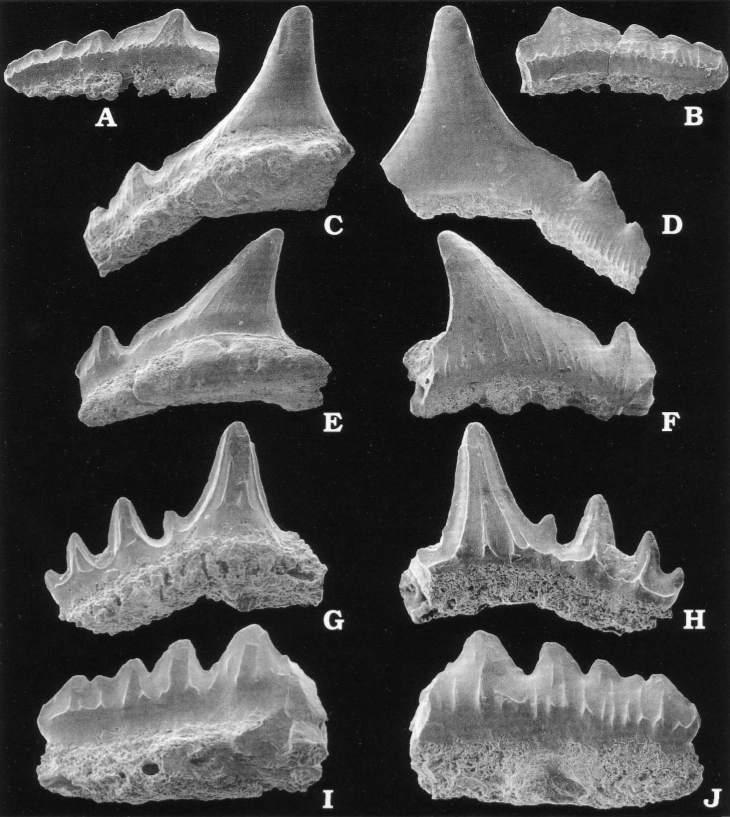
- Fossil teeth of Palidiplospinax occultidens (top) and P. enniskilleni

Scientific classification
- Kingdom: Animalia
- Phylum: Chordata
- Class: Chondrichthyes
- Subclass: Elasmobranchii
- Order: †Synechodontiformes; Duffin & Ward, 1993

Families
- See text

= Synechodontiformes =

Synechodontiformes Temporal range: Early Permian-Paleogene 290.1–37.2 Ma

Extinct order of cartilaginous fishes

Synechodontiformes is an extinct order of prehistoric shark-like cartilaginous fish, known from the Permian to the Paleogene. They are considered to be members of Neoselachii, the group that contains modern sharks and rays.

Their placement in the group is uncertain, some authors have considered them to be members of the modern shark group Galeomorphi, while others have considered them to represent a stem-group to modern sharks, with some suggesting that they are basal to the last common ancestor of modern sharks and rays. There is also disagreement about the relationships between Triassic and earlier members of the group, only known from isolated teeth, and those from the Jurassic onwards, with the similarity between the two groups possibly being superficial.

The main shared characters of the group relate to teeth anatomy. The teeth roots have a distinctive pseudopolyaulacorhize vascularisation pattern, with a depression on the tooth root to where the nutritive grooves are confined. While Klug (2010) recovered the group as monophyletic, the monophyly of the group has been doubted by other authors, who suggest that they represent a paraphyletic group, and that the tooth vascularisation patterns do not clearly demonstrate that these sharks are more closely related to each other than to other sharks. One family is unambiguously placed in the order, Palaeospinacidae. The families Orthacodontidae, Paraorthacodontidae and Pseudonotidanidae, often considered members of the group, have been alternatively considered as members of the modern shark order Hexanchiformes rather than as members of Synechodontiformes.

The oldest known synechodontiform remains are teeth of Synechodus antiquus from the early Permian (Cisuralian) of the Ural Mountains. However, other authors have considered the attribution to the teeth to Synechodus to be questionable.

== Taxonomy ==
- †Palaeospinacidae (Regan, 1906).
  - †Antrigoulia (Guinot, Cappetta, & Adnet, 2014). Southern France, Early Cretaceous (Valanginian).
  - †Palidiplospinax (Klug & Kriwet, 2008). Europe, Early Jurassic
  - †Palaeospinax (Egerton, 1872) (nomen dubium)
  - †Synechodus (Woodward, 1888) Worldwide, Permian to Eocene
  - †Nemacanthus (Agassiz, 1837) Worldwide, Permian-Late Triassic (not considered to belong to the family by some authors)
- Incertae sedis
  - †Mucrovenator (Cuny et al., 2001), Northwestern Nevada, USA, Middle Triassic (Anisian, 245 Ma).
  - †Polyfaciodus (Koot & Cuny, 2014). Oman, China, Early Triassic
  - †Safrodus (Koot & Cuny, 2014). Oman, China, Early Triassic
  - †Rhomphaiodon (Duffin, 1993) Europe, Late Triassic-Early Jurassic
  - †Parascylloides (Thies et al, 2016) Europe, Late Triassic
  - †Keichouodus (Li et al, 2021) China, Middle-Late Triassic
  - †Rhomaleodus Andreev and Cuny, 2012 Middle Triassic, Bulgaria

=== Disputed members ===
These members were classified in the Synechodontiformes by Klug (2010), but are classified by some other authors as Hexanchiformes:

- †Orthacodontidae de Beaumont, 1960
  - †Occitanodus (Guinot, Cappetta & Adnet, 2014). France, Early Cretaceous (Valanginian).
  - †Sphenodus (Agassiz, 1843). Early Jurassic to Paleocene.
  - Archaeogracilidens (Villalobos-Segura et al. 2025), Germany, Late Jurassic
- †Paraorthacodontidae (Klug, 2010)
  - †Macrourogaleus (Fowler, 1947). Southeastern Germany, Late Jurassic (Tithonian, 152-145 Ma).
  - †Paraorthacodus (Glikman, 1957) Worldwide, Early Jurassic-Eocene
- †Pseudonotidanidae Underwood and Ward 2004
  - †Welcommia Cappetta 1990 Early Jurassic-Early Cretaceous, Europe
  - †Pseudonotidanus (Underwood & Ward, 2004) Early-Middle Jurassic
