= Decazella =

Decazella Temporal range: Gzhelian

Scientific classification
- Kingdom: Animalia
- Phylum: Chordata
- Class: Actinopterygii
- Order: †Aeduelliformes
- Family: †Aeduellidae
- Genus: †Decazella; Heyler, 1967
- Species: †D. vetteri

Binomial name
- †Decazella vetteri (Heyler, 1964)

Synonyms
- †Aeduella vetteri Heyler, 1964

Extinct genus of ray-finned fishes

Decazella is an extinct genus of freshwater ray-finned fish that lived during the late Carboniferous period. It contains a single species, D. vetteri from the Gzhelian (Stephanian) age of what is now Occitania, France (near Decazeville).
