= Eychlaodus =

Eychlaodus Temporal range: Danian

Scientific classification
- Kingdom: Animalia
- Phylum: Chordata
- Class: Chondrichthyes
- Subclass: Elasmobranchii
- Family: †Orthacodontidae
- Genus: †Eychlaodus; Glickman, 1957

Type species
- †Eychlaodus lundgreni (Davis, 1890)

Synonyms
- Species synonymy: Oxyrhina lundgreni Davis, 1890; Sphenodus lundgreni (Davis, 1890)

Extinct genus of neoselachians

Eychlaodus is an extinct genus of neoselachians that lived during the Paleocene. It contains one species, E. lundgreni, which has been found in Denmark, Sweden, and Russia.

== Taxonomy ==
Oxyrhina lundgreni was named by James W. Davis in 1890 for isolated teeth from various localities in Denmark and Sweden. In 1957, Leonid S. Glickman named the new genus Eychlaodus for this species and referred additional teeth from Russia to it. Eychlaodus was synonymized with Sphenodus by Henri Cappetta in 1987. However, their synonymy was rejected by David J. Ward and colleagues in 2026.
