= Pseudonotidanidae =

Pseudonotidanidae Temporal range: 183–164.7 Ma

Scientific classification
- Domain: Eukaryota
- Kingdom: Animalia
- Phylum: Chordata
- Class: Chondrichthyes
- Subclass: Elasmobranchii
- Division: Selachii
- Order: Hexanchiformes
- Family: †Pseudonotidanidae; Underwood and Ward, 2004

Genera
- †Pseudonotidanus (Underwood & Ward, 2004a); †Welcommia (Cappetta, 1990)

Family of prehistoric sharks

Pseudonotidanidae is an extinct family of prehistoric sharks in the order Hexanchiformes. It was formerly part of the extinct order Synechodontiformes.
