= Antrigoulia =

Antrigoulia Temporal range: Valanginian

Scientific classification
- Kingdom: Animalia
- Phylum: Chordata
- Class: Chondrichthyes
- Subclass: Elasmobranchii
- Order: †Synechodontiformes
- Family: †Palaeospinacidae
- Genus: †Antrigoulia; Guinot, Cappetta, & Adnet, 2014
- Species: †A. circumplicata

Binomial name
- †Antrigoulia circumplicata Guinot, Cappetta, & Adnet, 2014

Extinct genus of cartilaginous fishes

Antrigoulia is an extinct genus of palaeospinacid cartilaginous fish from the Cretaceous period of France. The generic name refers to a farm in the vicinity of the type locality called Mas d’Antrigoule where isolated teeth were found in Valanginian-aged marine strata, A. circumplicata. The specific name is derived from the concentric folds on the labial side of its teeth.
