= Westollia =

Westollia Temporal range: Asselian

Scientific classification
- Kingdom: Animalia
- Phylum: Chordata
- Class: Actinopterygii
- Order: †Aeduelliformes
- Family: †Aeduellidae
- Genus: †Westollia; White & Moy-Thomas, 1940

Type species
- †Lepidopterus crassus (= †Westollia crassa) Pohlig, 1892

Synonyms
- †Lepidopterus Pohlig, 1892 non Agassiz 1846

Extinct genus of ray-finned fishes

Westollia is an extinct genus of ray-finned fish only known at Gottlob Quarry, from the early Asselian Goldlauter Formation of Thuringia, Germany.

The type and only species, Westollia crassa, was first described as Lepidopterus crassus, but because this genus name was preoccupied, a new genus name was given, Westollia, honoring Thomas Stanley Westoll. Redescription and study on the affinities of Westollia crassa was published by Štamberg (2024), who deesignated the complete specimen NHMS-GP1341 as its neotype.
