= Rhomaleodus =

Rhomaleodus Temporal range: Middle Triassic, Anisian

Scientific classification
- Kingdom: Animalia
- Phylum: Chordata
- Class: Chondrichthyes
- Subclass: Elasmobranchii
- Genus: †Rhomaleodus; Andreev & Cuny, 2012

Type species
- †Rhomaleodus budurovi Andreev & Cuny, 2012

Extinct genus of cartilaginous fishes

Rhomaleodus is an extinct genus of cartilaginous fish known from the Middle Triassic (Anisian stage) of Bulgaria. It was first named by Plamen S. Andreev and Gilles Cuny in 2012 and the type species is Rhomaleodus budurovi. While originally identified as a member of Selachii incertae sedis, later studies suggested a placement within the Synechodontiformes.
