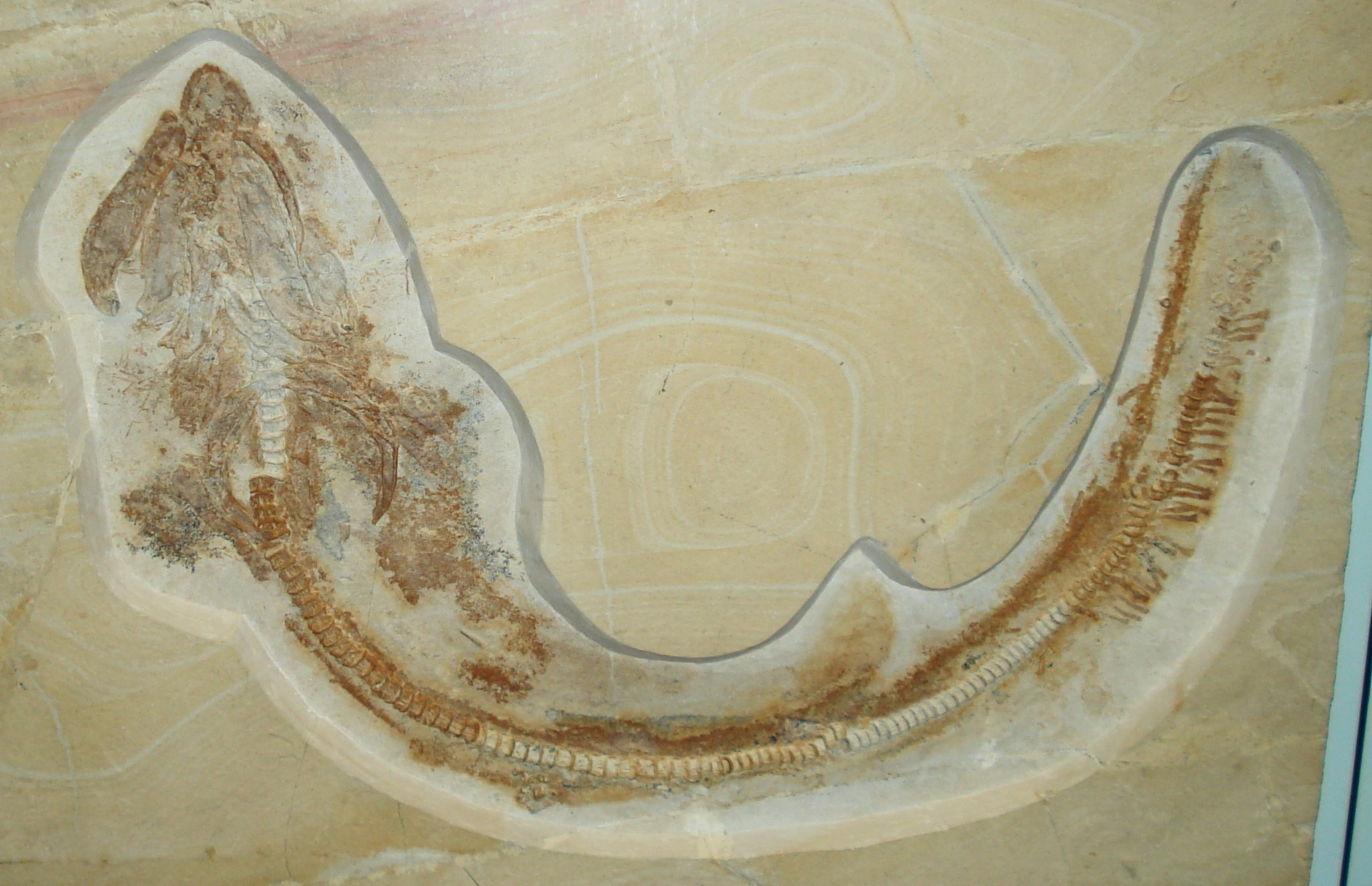
- Paraorthacodus jurensis specimen SMNS 88987/1
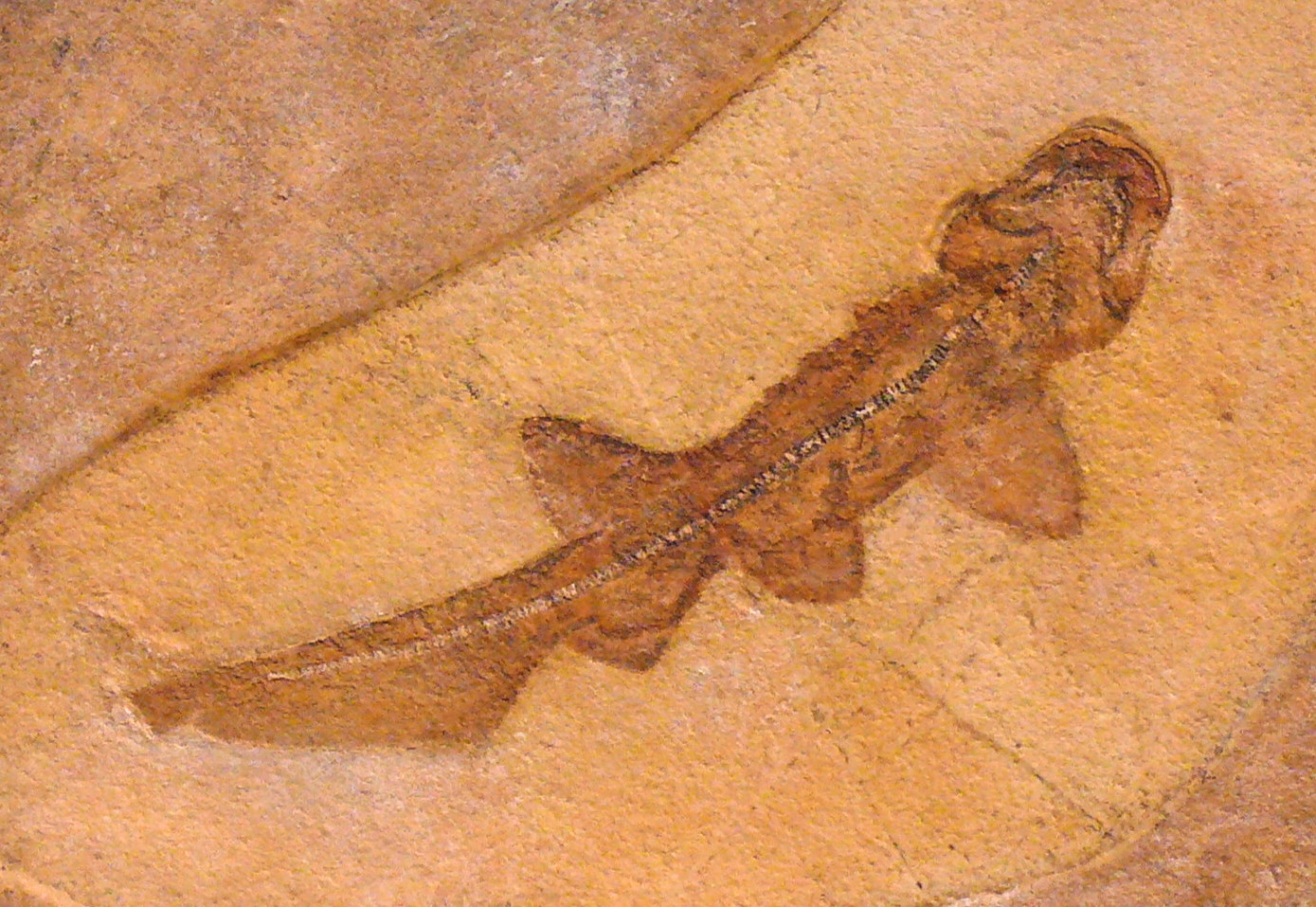
- Paraorthacodus jurensis specimen BSPG 1996 I 31

Scientific classification
- Kingdom: Animalia
- Phylum: Chordata
- Class: Chondrichthyes
- Subclass: Elasmobranchii
- Family: †Paraorthacodontidae
- Genus: †Paraorthacodus; Glückman, 1957

Species
- P. andersoni P. antarcticus P. arduennae P. clarkii P. conicus P. eocaenus P. jurensis P. recurvus P. turgaicus

= Paraorthacodus =

Paraorthacodus Temporal range: Early Jurassic–Eocene

Extinct genus of sharks

Paraorthacodus is an extinct genus of shark. It a member of the family Paraorthacodontidae (though it was formerly regarded as a member of the family Palaeospinacidae), which is either placed in Hexanchiformes or in Synechodontiformes. It is known from over a dozen named species spanning from the Early Jurassic to the Paleocene, or possibly Eocene. Almost all members of the genus are exclusively known from isolated teeth, with the exception of P. jurensis from the Late Jurassic-Early Cretaceous of Europe, which is known from full body fossils from the Late Jurassic of Germany, which suggest that juveniles had a robust body with a round head, while adults had large body sizes with a fusiform profile. There was only a single dorsal fin towards the back of the body without a fin spine. The dentition had teeth with a single large central cusp along with shorter lateral cusplets, which were designed for clutching. The teeth are distinguished from those of Synechodus by the lateral cusplets decreasing in size linearly away from the central cusp rather than exponentially as in Synechodus.

== Taxonomy ==
After

- Paraorthacodus andersoni (Case, 1978) Late Cretaceous (Santonian and Campanian)
- Paraorthacodus antarcticus Klug et al., 2008 Late Cretaceous (Campanian)
- Paraorthacodus clarkii (Eastman, 1901) Paleocene (Thanetian)
- Paraorthacodus conicus (Davis, 1890) Late Cretaceous (Coniacian to Campanian)
- Paraorthacodus eocaenus (Leriche, 1902) Paleogene (Thanetian to Ypresian according to, exclusively Thanetian according to, considered a synonym of P. clarkii by)
- Paraorthacodus jurensis (Schweizer, 1964) Late Jurassic (Kimmeridgian)
- Paraorthacodus nerviensis (Leriche, 1929) uppermost Cretaceous
- Paraorthacodus patagonicus (Ameghino, 1893) Late Cretaceous (Coniacian)
- Paraorthacodus recurvus (Trautschold, 1877) Cretaceous (Albian-uppermost Cretaceous)
- Paraorthacodus sulcatus (Davis, 1888) Late Cretaceous (Campanian)
- Paraorthacodus validus (Chapman, 1918) from the Cretaceous
- Paraorthacodus turgaicus Glickman, 1964, Paleocene (Thanetian)
- Paraorthacodus helveticus (De Beaumont 1960) Early Jurassic (Sinemurian)
- Paraorthacodus arduennae Delsate, 2001) Early Jurassic (Pliensbachian)
- Paraorthacodus kruckowi (Thies 1983) Middle Jurassic (Aalenian)
