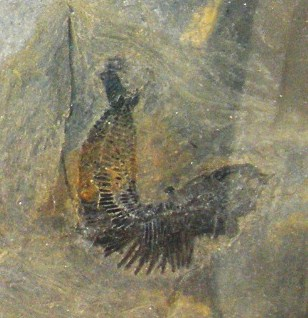
- Placopleurus besanensis fossil

Scientific classification
- Kingdom: Animalia
- Phylum: Chordata
- Class: Actinopterygii
- Order: †Peltopleuriformes
- Family: †Peltopleuridae
- Genus: †Placopleurus

Type species
- †Placopleurus primus Brough, 1939

Other species
- †P. besanensis (Bassani, 1886)

= Placopleurus =

Placopleurus Temporal range: Middle Triassic

Extinct genus of fishes

Placopleurus is an extinct genus of prehistoric ray-finned fish from the Middle Triassic epoch (Anisian and Ladinian stages) of Italy, Slovenia, and Switzerland.

== See also ==
- Prehistoric fish
- List of prehistoric bony fish
