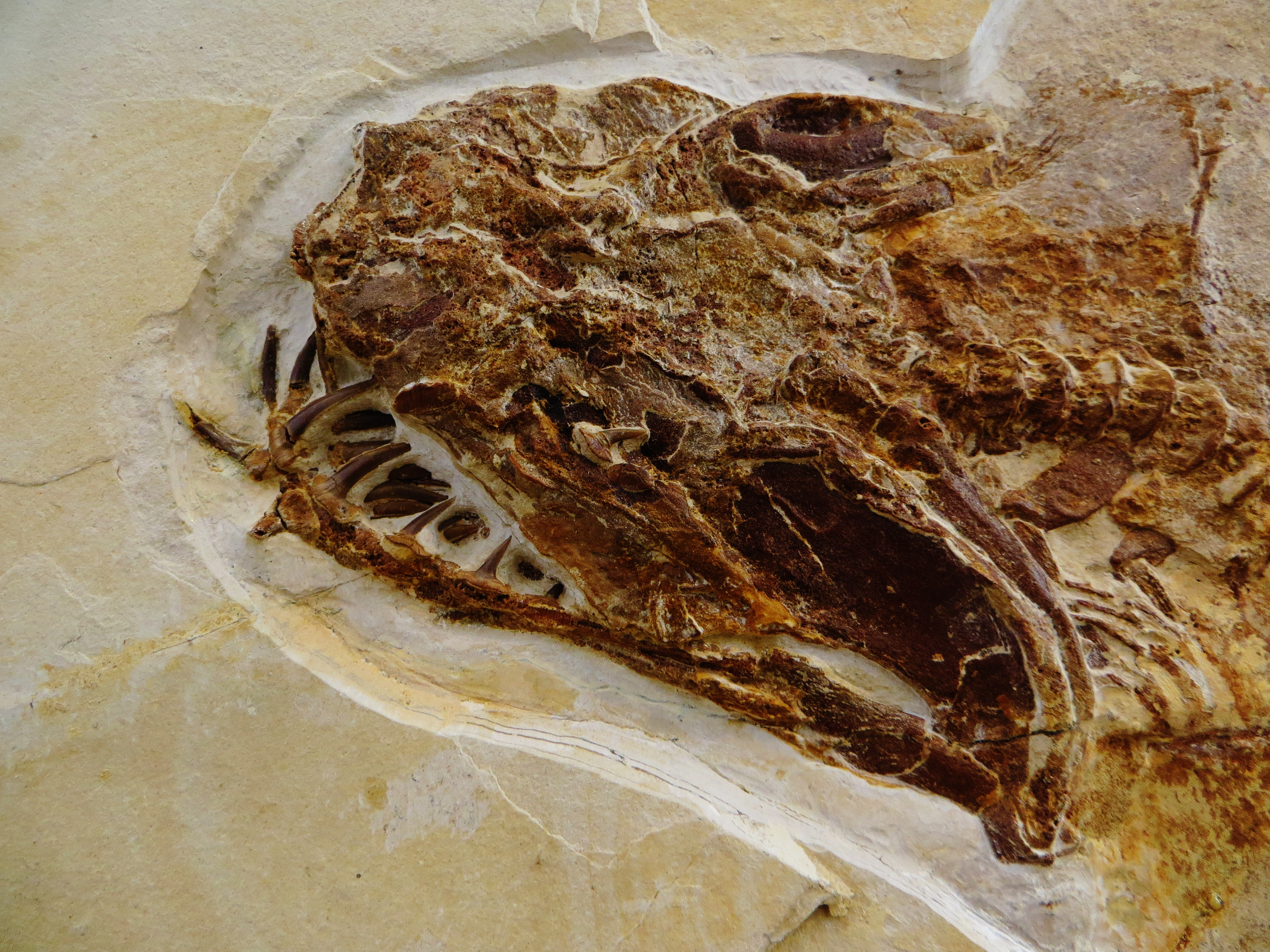
- Head of Archaeogracilidens macer

Scientific classification
- Kingdom: Animalia
- Phylum: Chordata
- Class: Chondrichthyes
- Subclass: Elasmobranchii
- Family: †Orthacodontidae; Glickman, 1957

Genera
- †Archaeogracilidens Villalobos-Segura et al., 2025; †Eychlaodus Glickman, 1957; †Occitanodus Guinot, Cappetta & Adnet, 2014; †Sphenodus Agassiz, 1843

= Orthacodontidae =

Orthacodontidae Temporal range: Early Jurassic–Paleocene

Extinct family of sharks

Orthacodontidae (also spelled Orthacodidae) is an extinct family of sharks. It is disputed as to whether it belongs to the modern shark order Hexanchiformes, or the extinct order Synechodontiformes. It contains four genera. Some other authors included it in Lamniformes. More recent studies have generally favored its placement in the Hexanchiformes.

== Species ==
- Archaeogracilidens Villalobos-Segura et al., 2025
  - Archaeogracilidens macer (Quenstedt, 1852)
- Eychlaodus Glickman, 1957
  - Eychlaodus lundgreni (Davis, 1890)
- Occitanodus Guinot, Cappetta & Adnet, 2014
  - Occitanodus sudrei Guinot, Cappetta & Adnet, 2014
- Sphenodus Agassiz, 1843 (Nomen dubium)
  - Sphenodus alpinus Gümbel, 1861
  - Sphenodus longidens Agassiz, 1843
  - Sphenodus planus Agassiz, 1843
  - Sphenodus rectidens Emmons, 1858
  - Sphenodus robustidens Seguenza, 1900
  - Sphenodus tithonius Gemmellaro, 1871
  - Sphenodus virgai Gemmellaro, 1871
