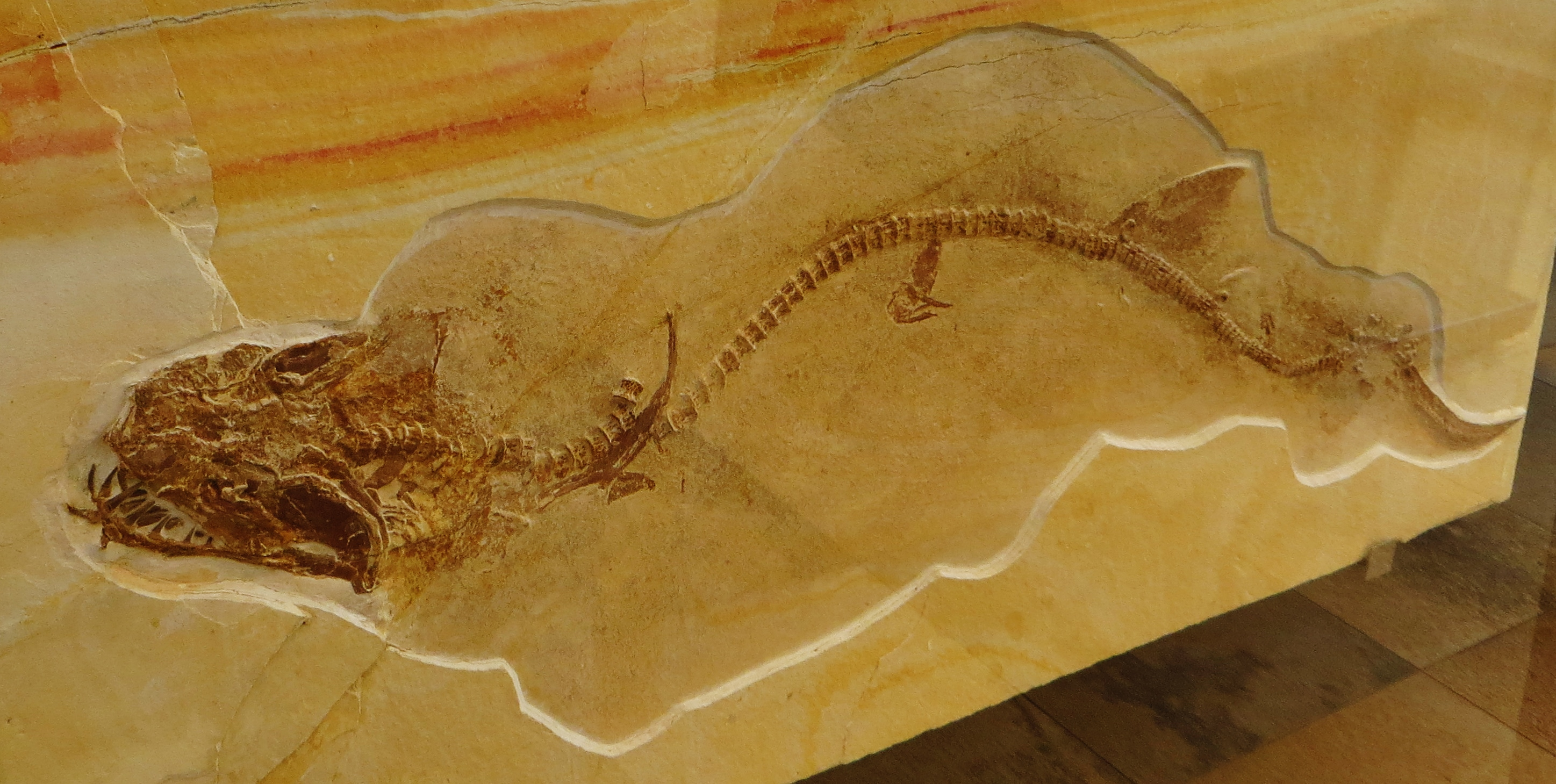
- Skeleton of Sphenodus nitidus (SMNS 96844-7) from the Late Jurassic of Germany
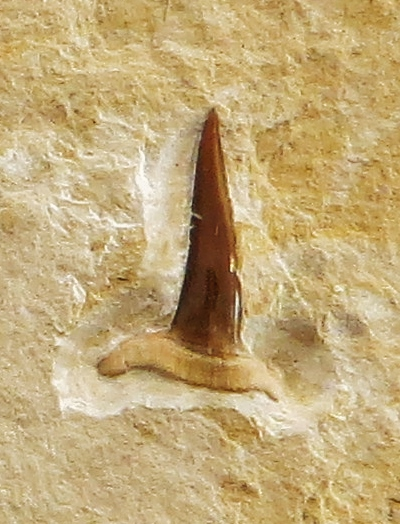
- Tooth of Sphenodus nitidus

Scientific classification
- Kingdom: Animalia
- Phylum: Chordata
- Class: Chondrichthyes
- Subclass: Elasmobranchii
- Family: †Orthacodontidae
- Genus: †Sphenodus; Agassiz, 1843

Type species
- Lamna (Sphenodus) longidens Agassiz, 1843

= Sphenodus =

Sphenodus Temporal range: Sinemurian–Danian

Fossil genus of fishes

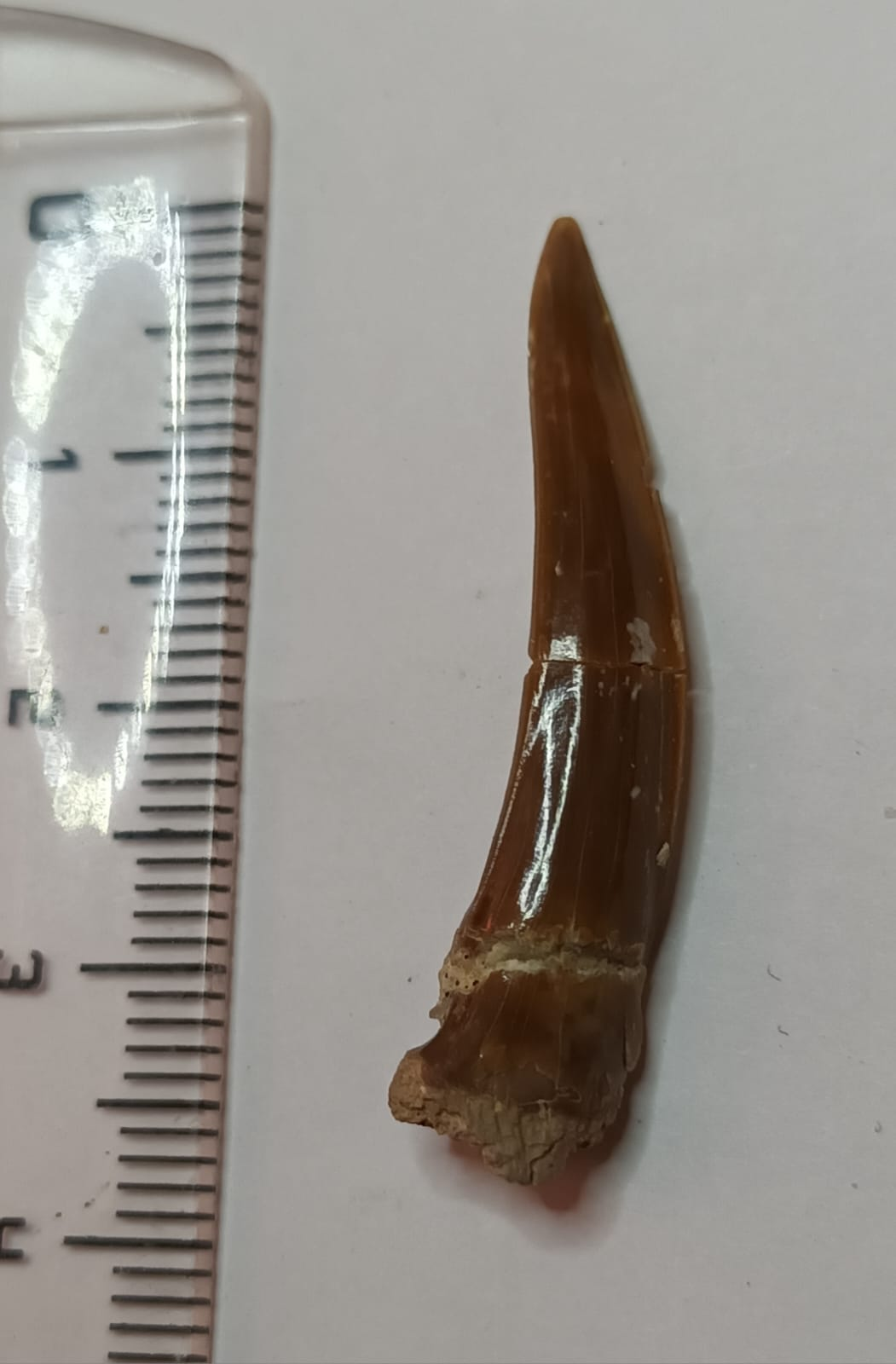
Sphenodus tooth from the oxfordian of Bel-Air, Hérault, France.

Sphenodus is an extinct genus of shark. It is placed as a member of the extinct family Orthacodontidae, which is either considered to be a member of the extinct order Synechodontiformes, or the modern shark order Hexanchiformes.

== Species classification ==
29 species have been described, though some of these are likely synonyms, which span from the Early Jurassic (Sinemurian) to Paleocene (Danian). Most species are only known from isolated teeth, though the species Sphenodus macer and Sphenodus nitidus from the Late Jurassic of Germany are known from skeletons. These suggest that it was relatively large, with a body length of 2–3 metres (6.6–9.8 ft), with a fusiform body with a single dorsal fin placed posteriorly without a fin spine. The teeth of Sphenodus consist of a single long, narrow central cusp, with much smaller lateral cusplets. Species of Sphenodus are thought to have been actively swimming predators, eating cephalopods.

A 2025 study considered Sphenodus nitidus to be a synonym of S. macer, and suggested that Sphenodus should be considered a nomen dubium. This is due to a lack of diagnostic characters associated with original type specimen teeth used to define the genus, with S. macer assigned to the new genus Archaeogracilidens which was also placed as a member of Orthacodontidae within the Hexanchiformes.
