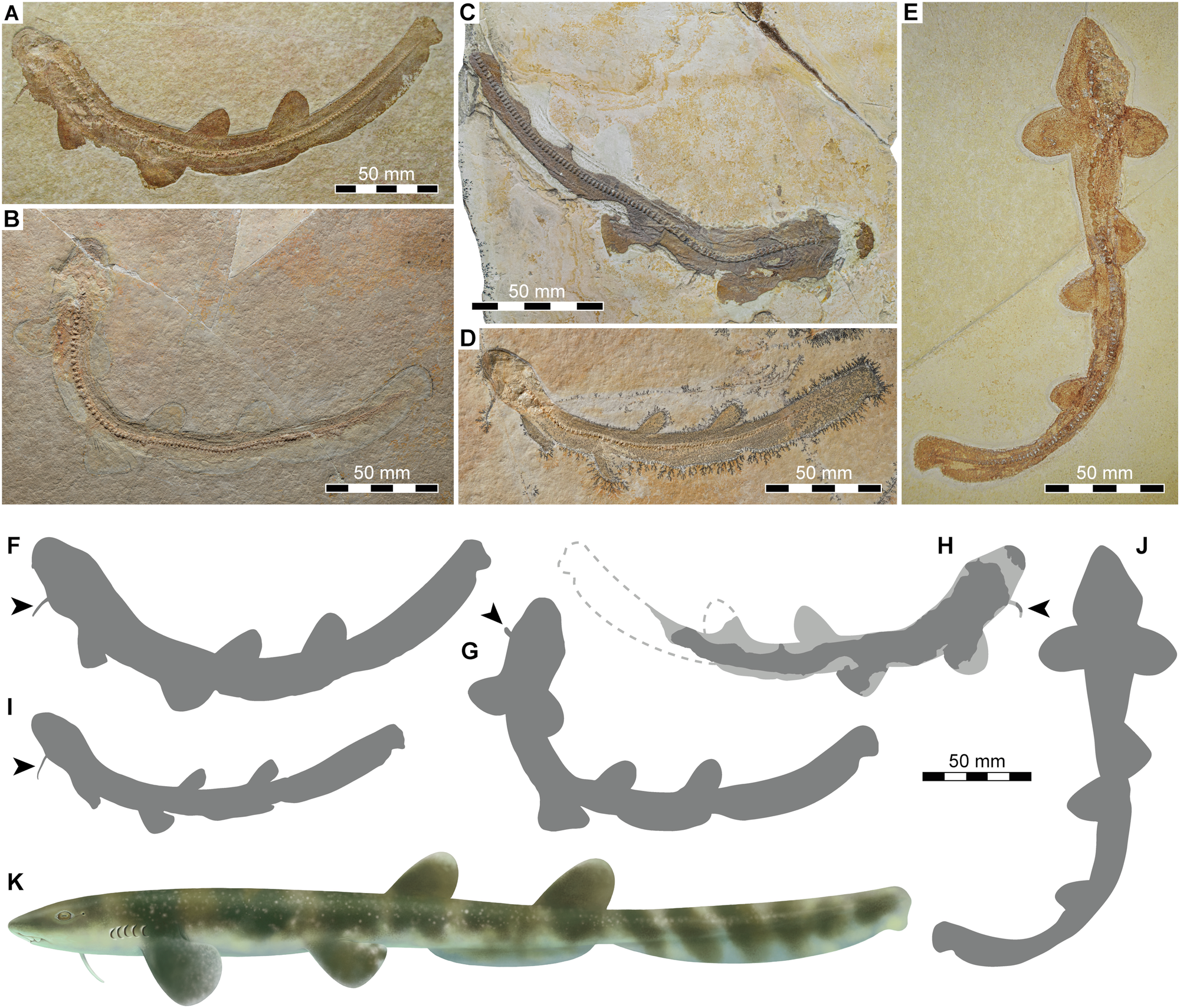
- Various fossil specimens and life restoration

Scientific classification
- Kingdom: Animalia
- Phylum: Chordata
- Class: Chondrichthyes
- Subclass: Elasmobranchii
- Division: Selachii
- Superorder: Galeomorphi
- Genus: †Bavariscyllium; Thies, 2005
- Species: †B. tischlingeri

Binomial name
- †Bavariscyllium tischlingeri Thies, 2005

= Bavariscyllium =

Bavariscyllium Temporal range: Tithonian

Extinct catshark from the Jurassic

Bavariscyllium is an extinct genus of galeomorph shark. It lived in Germany during the Jurassic period (lower Tithonian). It is known by a singular species Bavariscyllium tischlingeri.

It was a small species of shark with an elongated body, with specimens ranging in length from 19 to 25 centimetres (7.5 to 9.8 in). It possesses a whisker-like throat barbel. It also had both rounded pectoral and pelvic fins and a low caudal fin without the ventral lobe. The dorsal fins, which are also rounded, are located far back on the body. The anal fin extends from the posterior edge of the first dorsal fin to the posterior edge of the second dorsal fin. The anal fin has a low, elongated shape. It has generalised clutching-type teeth with a hemiaulacorhize root. This root is characterized by strongly flared root lobes which closely resembles those of the earliest carcharhiniforms from the Middle Jurassic period.

Although previously considered a catshark in the modern family Scyliorhinidae in the Carcharhiniformes (ground sharks), the whisker-like throat barbel potentially suggests that Bavariscyllium has a closer relationship to the family Parascylliidae within the Orectolobiformes (carpet sharks) instead. However the features it has neither confirm or refute a possible relationship with carcharhiniform sharks, leaving its classification incertae sedis within Galeomorphi.

== Discovery ==
It was described off a single complete holotype specimen found in the Solnhofen Archipelago of southern Germany. While the stratigraphy is known, the exact locale is not. The dentition of this genus is poorly known as the specimen of it had fragmentary teeth remains. There may be more, albeit fragmentary, dental remains that have been attributed to Bavariscyllium found in Mahlstetten of southern Germany that has been dated to the lower Kimmeridgian age.

=== Etymology ===
The genus name is derived from the German state of Bavaria, in which it was found, and a Greek mythological sea monster, Scylla. The species was named after the person who donated it, Mr. Helmut Tischlinger.
