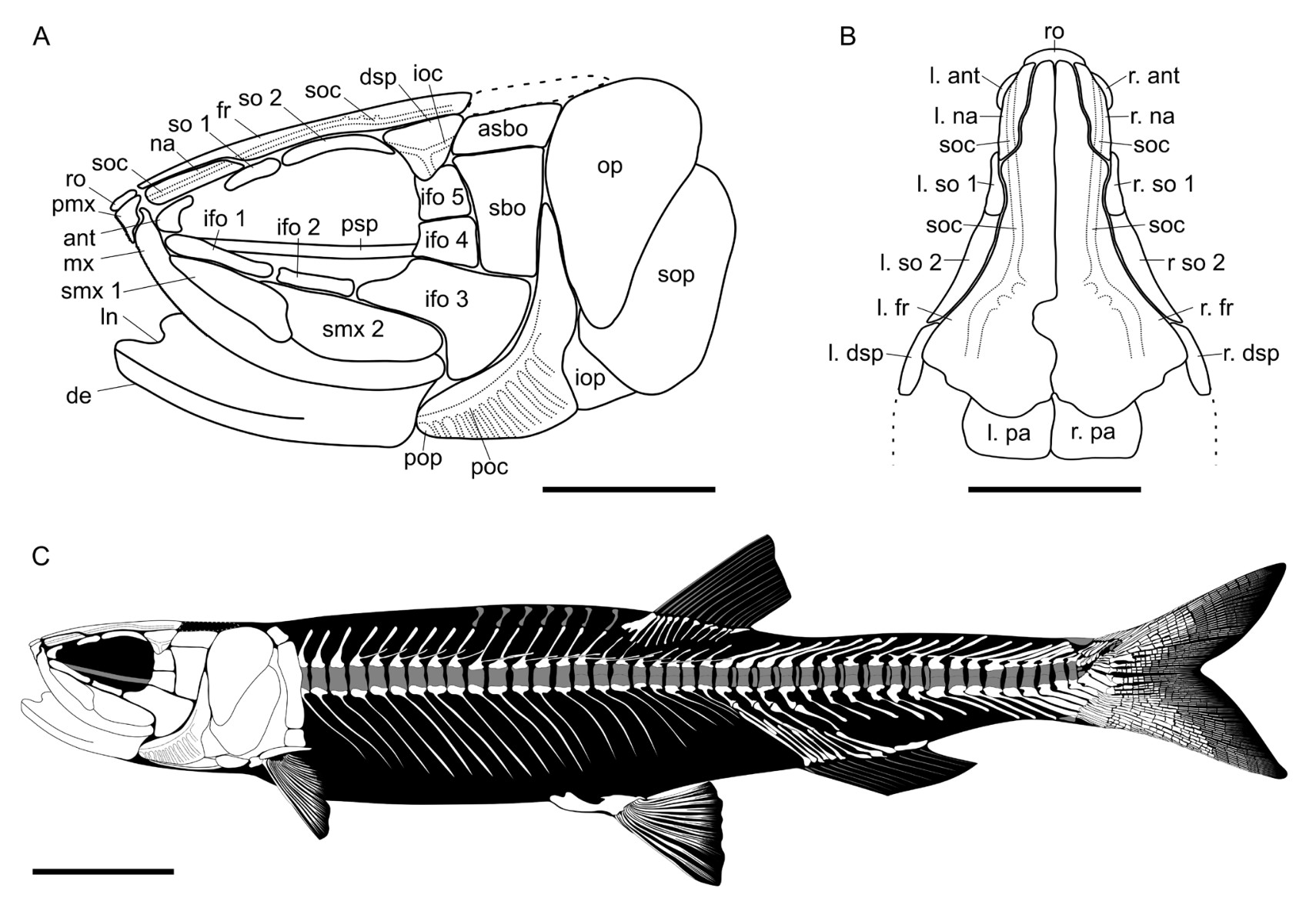

Scientific classification
- Kingdom: Animalia
- Phylum: Chordata
- Class: Actinopterygii
- Division: Teleostei
- Order: †Pholidophoriformes
- Family: †Pholidophoridae
- Genus: †Pholidolepis; Nybelin, 1966

= Pholidolepis =

Pholidolepis Temporal range: 202–197 Ma

Extinct genus of fishes

Pholidolepis is an extinct genus of prehistoric ray-finned fish.

== See also ==
- Prehistoric fish
- List of prehistoric bony fish
