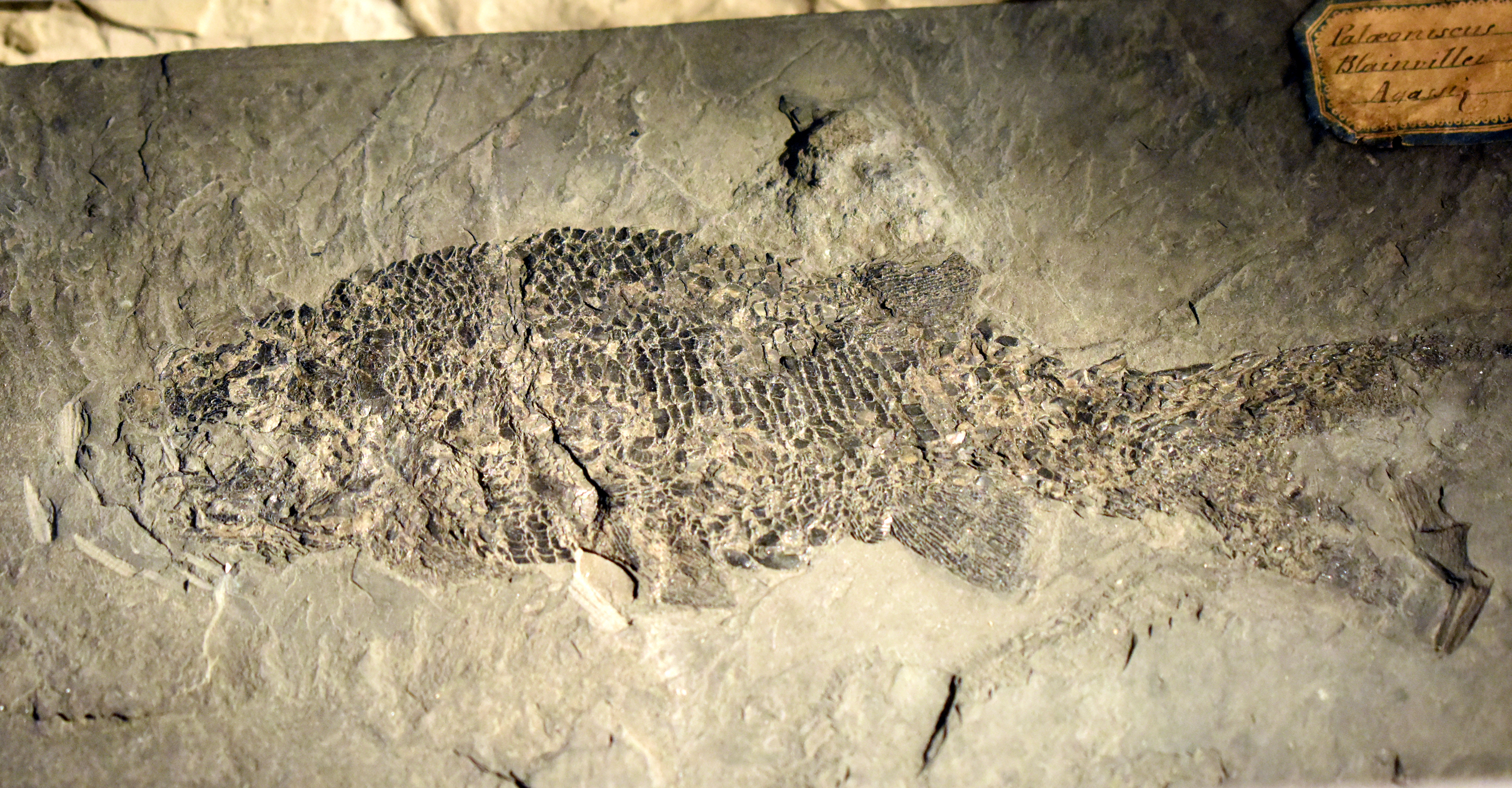
- Specimen of Aeduella blainvillei

Scientific classification
- Kingdom: Animalia
- Phylum: Chordata
- Class: Actinopterygii
- Order: †Aeduelliformes
- Family: †Aeduellidae; Romer, 1945

= Aeduellidae =

Aeduellidae Temporal range: Bashkirian-Asselian

Extinct family of fishes

Aeduellidae is an extinct family of "palaeoniscoid" ray-finned fishes (Actinopterygii), known from the Bashkirian-Asselian of Europe and North America. The family includes the following genera: Aeduella, Amelangia, Bourbonnella, Decazella, Franchessella, Neslovicella, Platysella, Puertollanichthys, Shafeevus, Spinarichthys, Stephaniella and Westollia.

== Classification ==
This list follows the most recent aeduellid classification.

- Family †Aeduellidae Romer, 1954
  - Genus †Aeduella Westoll, 1937
    - Species †Aeduella blainvillei type (Agassiz, 1833)
  - Genus †Amelangia Štamberg & Werneburg, 2023
    - Species †Amelangia ornata Štamberg & Werneburg, 2023
  - Genus †Bourbonnella Heyler, 1967
    - Species †Bourbonnella fourrieri Poplin, 2001
    - Species †Bourbonnella guilloti type Heyler, 1969
    - Species †Bourbonnella hirsuta Štamberg, 2007
    - Species †Bourbonnella jocelynae Mickle, 2011
    - Species †Bourbonnella sottyi (Anonymous, 1972)
  - Genus †Decazella Heyler, 1967
    - Species †Decazella vetteri type (Heyler, 1964)
  - Genus †Franchessella Gonçalves et al., 2026a
    - Species †Franchessella pohlcremeri type Gonçalves et al., 2026a
  - Genus †Neslovicella Štamberg, 2007
    - Species †Neslovicella elongata Štamberg, 2010
    - Species †Neslovicella rzehaki type Štamberg, 2007
  - Genus †Platysella Heyler & Poplin, 1983
    - Species †Platysella descusi Heyler & Poplin, 1983
    - Species †Platysella lallyi type Heyler & Poplin, 1983
    - Species †Platysella poplinae Heyler, 2002
  - Genus †Puertollanichthys Forey & Young, 1985
    - Species †Puertollanichthys ritchiei type Forey & Young, 1985
  - Genus ?†Shafeevus Yankevich & Minich, 1998
    - Species †Shafeevus sulcatus type Yankevich & Minich, 1998
  - Genus †Spinarichthys Štamberg, 1986
    - Species †Spinarichthys dispersus type Štamberg, 1986
  - Genus †Stephaniella Gonçalves et al, 2026b
    - Species †Stephaniella melanocephala type Gonçalves et al., 2026b
  - Genus †Westollia White & Moy-Thomas, 1940
    - Species †Westollia crassa type (Pohlig, 1892 non Agassiz 1846)
