= Eosteus =

Eosteus Temporal range: Telychian

Scientific classification
- Kingdom: Animalia
- Phylum: Chordata
- Clade: Osteichthyes
- Genus: †Eosteus
- Species: †E. chongqingensis

Binomial name
- †Eosteus chongqingensis Zhu et al., 2026

Extinct genus of basal bony fish

Eosteus is an extinct monotypic genus of basal bony fish that lived in what is now China during the Telychian stage of the Llandovery epoch.

== Description ==
Eosteus chongqingensis was fusiform in overall body appearance. It possessed caudal fulcra and a single dorsal fin, features characteristic of actinopterygians. It also had pectoral, dorsal, and anal fin spines, serial dorsal plates, and an absence of lepidotrichia, features shared with stem group chondrichthyans.
