= Thomas Stanley Westoll =

English geologist

Professor Thomas Stanley Westoll FRS FRSE FGS FLS

J. B. Simpson Professor of Geology, King's College, Newcastle upon Tyne/University of Newcastle upon Tyne
- In office 1948–1977

Personal details
- Born: 3 July 1912 West Hartlepool, County Durham, England
- Died: 19 September 1995 (aged 83) Newcastle upon Tyne, England
- Occupation: Geologist

Thomas Stanley Westoll (3 July 1912 – 19 September 1995) was a British geologist, and the long-time head of the Department of Geology at Newcastle University.

== Education and career ==
He was born in West Hartlepool the son of Horace Stanley Raine Westoll. He was educated at the West Hartlepool Grammar School. He then studied Sciences on a scholarship at Durham University, specialising in geology and palaeontology, graduating BSc in 1932.

Continuing as a postgraduate he gained his first doctorate (PhD) in 1934 from research on Permian fishes. In 1937 he began lecturing in Geology and Mineralogy at Aberdeen University, his central interest being the study of fossil fish. In 1943 he was elected a Fellow of the Royal Society of Edinburgh. His proposers were Robert MacFarlane Neill, Thomas Phemister, Ernest Cruickshank, and James Robert Matthews. Aberdeen University awarded him his second doctorate (DSc).

In 1948 he left Aberdeen to return to England as Professor of Geology at the University of Newcastle, staying there until his retirement in 1977. In retirement he remained as a research fellow and Chairman of Convocation.

He was elected a Fellow of the Royal Society of London in March 1952. The citation on his application read: "Westoll is a palaeontologist who by his description of new materials and by the introduction of new and fertile ideas into the interpretation of the structure of early fossil vertebrates has greatly increased our understanding of the problems they present. He has introduced new views about the origins of the pectoral fins of craniates and of the Tetrapod limb. He has clarified our ideas about the homologies of the dermal skull bones of vertebrates and made a new and convincing comparison between the skulls of Amphibia and Fish. He has made important contributions towards the solution of the old problems of the origin of the mammalian palate and ear. His monograph of the Haplolepidae sets a new standard for taxonomic work on fossil fish".

He was on the council of the Royal Society and from 1972 to 1974 was President of the Geological Society of London.

He died in Newcastle upon Tyne on 19 September 1995.

== Family ==
He married twice: firstly in 1939 to Dorothy Cecil Isobel Wood, then, following divorce in 1951, in 1952 he married Barbara Swanson McAdie.

== Research interests ==
His research interests were wide-ranging, but he is best known for his work on the evolution of fish. The development of the tetrapod limb and issues with the Silurian-Devonian boundary were some of the topics which occupied him. Throughout a long academic career he made forceful and important contributions in these and other fields.

A genus or early Permian ray-finned fish, Westollia White & Moy-Thomas, 1940, is named in his honour.

== Publications ==
- Studies on Fossil Vertebrates (1958)
- Geology of the USSR (1973)
