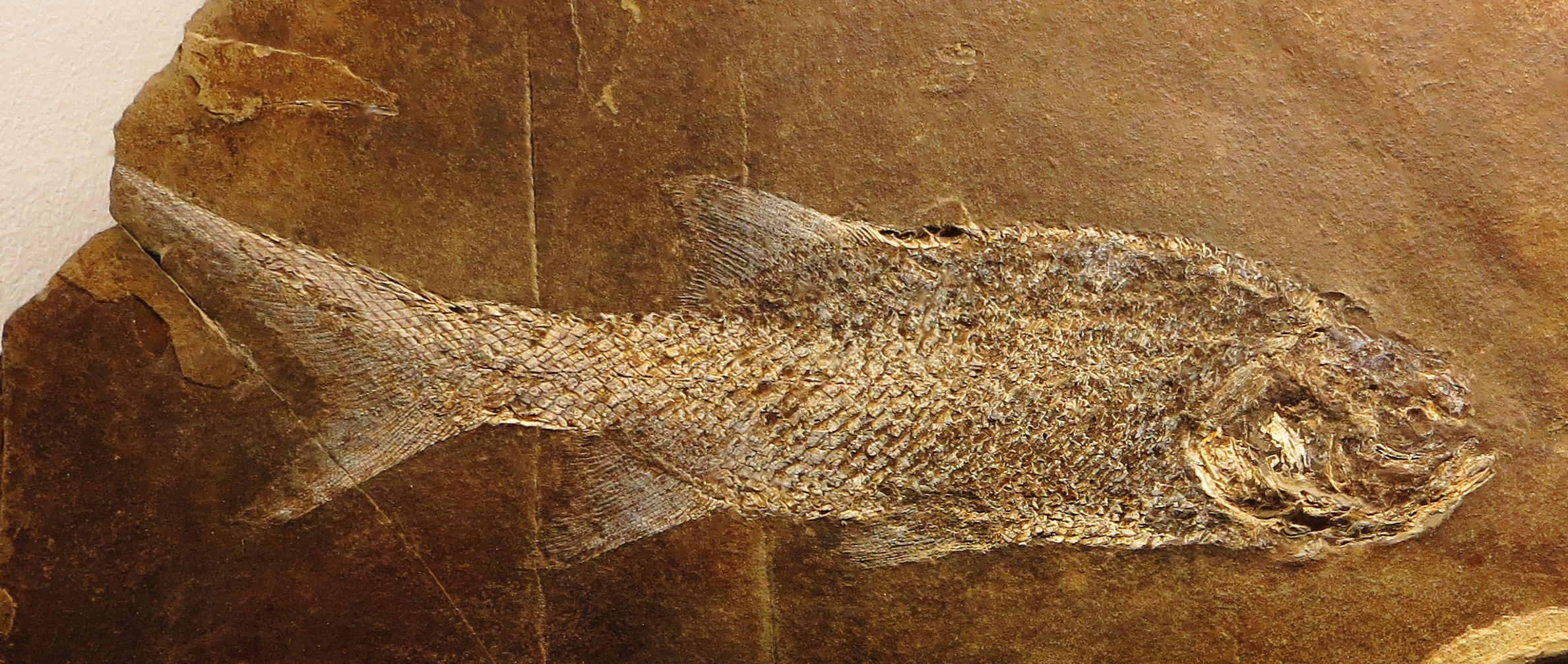
- Aeduella sp. fossil

Scientific classification
- Kingdom: Animalia
- Phylum: Chordata
- Class: Actinopterygii
- Order: †Aeduelliformes
- Family: †Aeduellidae
- Genus: †Aeduella; Westoll, 1937
- Species: †A. blainvillei

Binomial name
- †Aeduella blainvillei (Agassiz, 1833)

Synonyms
- †Palaeoniscus blainvillei Agassiz, 1833

= Aeduella =

Aeduella Temporal range: Gzhelian-Sakmarian

Extinct genus of ray-finned fishes

Aeduella is an extinct genus of freshwater ray-finned fish that lived during the Gzhelian (Late Pennsylvanian, Carboniferous ) and Asselian-Sakmarian (Cisuralian/early Permian epoch) ages in what is now France (Mayenne, Auvergne, Burgundy and Aveyron), Germany (Baden-Württemberg, Rhineland-Palatine, Saarland), and Switzerland (Basel-Landschaft, Zürich).

The type and only species is Aeduella blainvillei. It is restricted to occurrences in the Autun, Decazeville, Bourbon-l'Archambault, and Saar-Nahe basins.
