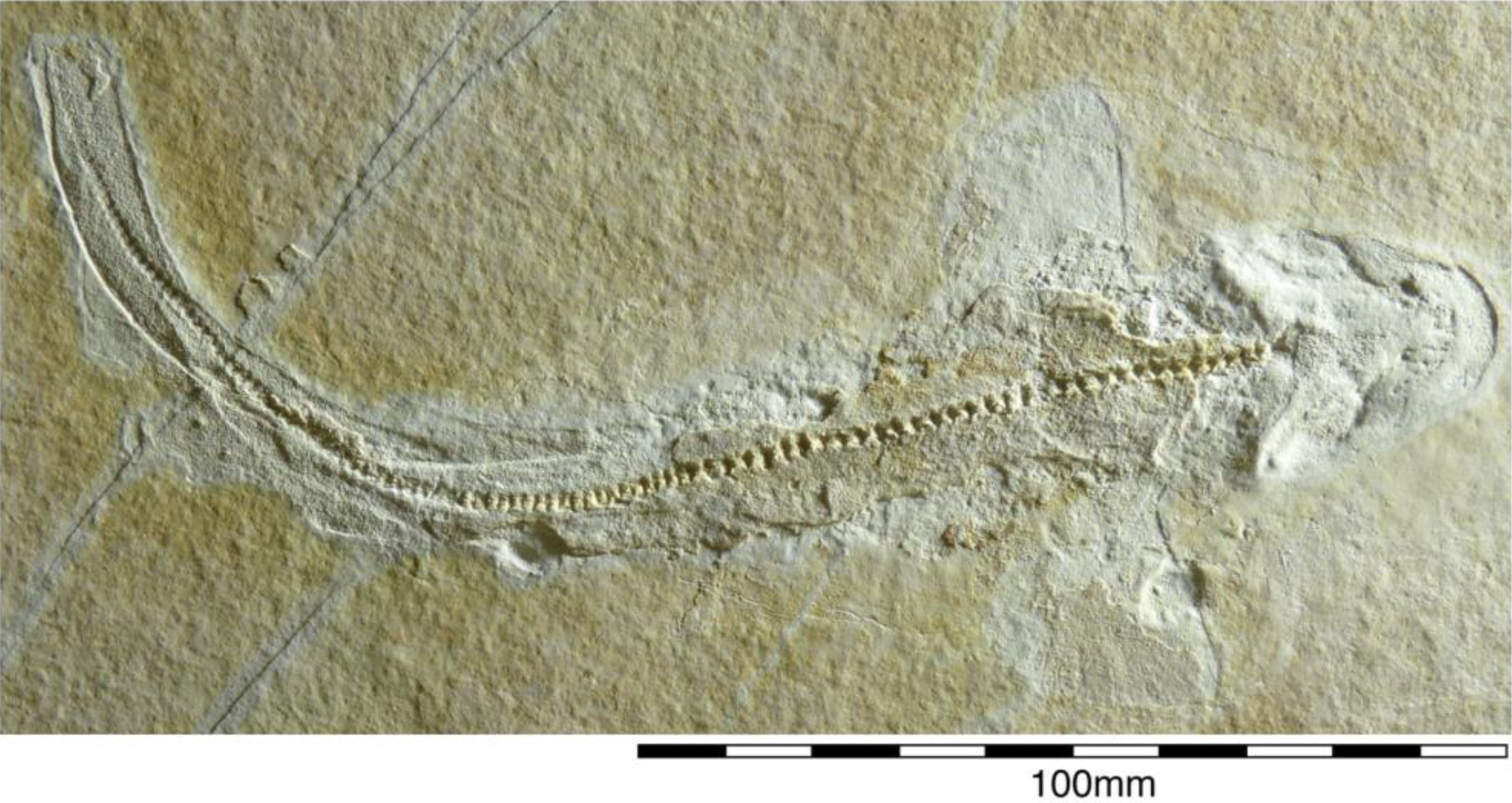
- Skeleton of Synechodus ungeri (JME SOS 3152 B) from the Late Jurassic of Solnhofen, Germany
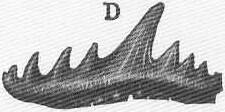
- Tooth of Synechodus dubrisianus

Scientific classification
- Kingdom: Animalia
- Phylum: Chordata
- Class: Chondrichthyes
- Subclass: Elasmobranchii
- Order: †Synechodontiformes
- Family: †Palaeospinacidae
- Genus: †Synechodus; Woodward, 1888

Type species
- Hybodus dubrisiensis Mackie, 1863

= Synechodus =

Synechodus Temporal range: Late Triassic–Palaeocene

Fossil genus of cartilaginous fish

Synechodus is an extinct genus of cartilaginous fish belonging to the family Palaeospinacidae and order Synechodontiformes. It is known from 16 species primarily spanning from the Late Triassic to Paleocene. The dentition is multicusped and was used for grasping. Several species are known from skeletal remains, including the species Synechodus ungeri from the Late Jurassic of Germany, which shows that it was relatively short with large pectoral fins and a proportionally large head with a round snout. This species is suggested to have reached a body length of 30–40 centimetres (0.98–1.31 ft). Skeletal remains are also known of the species Synechodus dubrisiensis from the Cretaceous of Europe. A skeleton of an indeterminate species is also known from the Early Cretaceous (Albian) of France, with a body length of around 70 centimetres (2.3 ft). Synechodus is suggested to have had two dorsal fins that lacked fin spines, though the number of dorsal fins is unknown in Synechodus ungeri.

The remains of the oldest known Synecodontiformes from the Early Permian of Russia have been assigned to the genus as the species Synechodus antiquus, though other authors have considered its attribution to the genus doubtful, with other authors considering attribution of all other pre-Jurassic species to genus being questionable.
