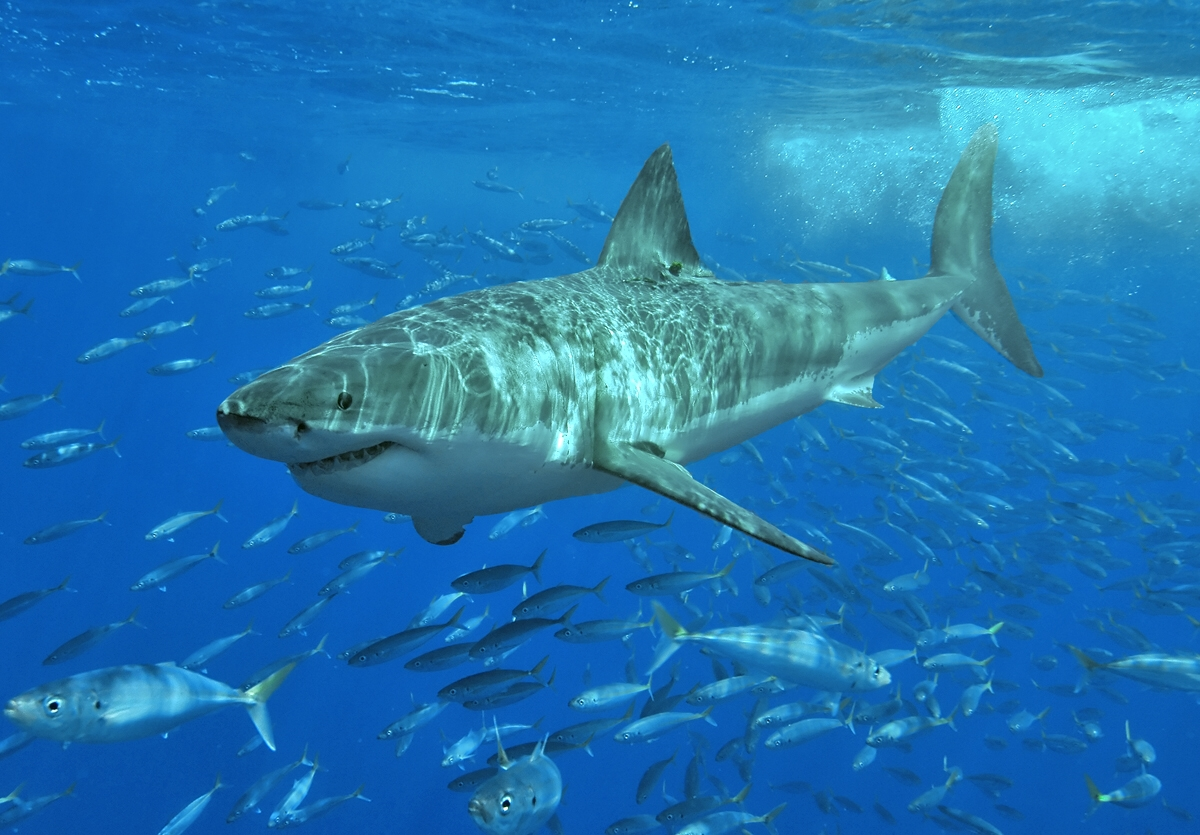
- Great white shark

Scientific classification
- Kingdom: Animalia
- Phylum: Chordata
- Class: Chondrichthyes
- Subclass: Elasmobranchii
- Division: Selachii
- Superorder: Galeomorphi; Compagno, 1973

Orders
- Heterodontiformes; Orectolobiformes; Lamniformes; Carcharhiniformes; †Palaeocarchariiformes; †Synechodontiformes?; †Bavariscyllium (incertae sedis)

= Galeomorphi =

Galeomorphi Temporal range: Jurassic–Recent

Superorder of sharks

Galeomorphi is a superorder of sharks. They are sometimes called galea or galean sharks. There are about 300 living species in 23 families. Galean sharks are divided into four orders: the Heterodontiformes, Orectolobiformes, Lamniformes, and Carcharhiniformes. The extinct, enigmatic Synechodontiformes are presently placed by some authors in the galeomorphs, but their taxonomic position still remains uncertain.

== Classification ==
=== Order Heterodontiformes ===
The bullhead sharks are a small order of basal modern sharks (Neoselachii). All are relatively small, with the largest species being just 150 centimetres (59 in) in adult length. They are bottom feeders in tropical and subtropical waters. They appear in the fossil record in the Early Jurassic, well before any of the other galean sharks. However, they have never been common, and it is likely their origin lies even further back.

There are ten living species in a single genus, Heterodontus and a single family.

- Family Heterodontidae (Bullhead sharks)

=== Order Orectolobiformes ===
Carpet sharks are another small order of sharks, so called because many members have ornate patterns reminiscent of carpets. Sometimes the term "carpet shark" is used interchangeably with wobbegong, which are a subgroup of the order. Carpet sharks have two dorsal fins, without spines, and a small mouth that is forward of the eyes. Many have barbels and small gill slits, with the fifth slit overlapping the fourth. The upper lobe of the caudal fin tends to be mostly in line with the body, while the lower lobe is poorly developed.

The order has around 43 species in 7 families and 13 genera:

- Family Brachaeluridae Applegate (Blind sharks)
- Family Ginglymostomatidae Gill, 1862 (Nurse sharks)
- Family Hemiscylliidae Gill, 1862 (Bamboo sharks)
- Family Orectolobidae Gill, 1896 (Wobbegong sharks)
- Family Parascylliidae Gill, 1862 (Collared carpet sharks)
- Family Rhincodontidae (J. P. Müller & Henle, 1839) (Whale sharks)
- Family Stegostomatidae Gill, 1862 (Zebra sharks)

=== Order Lamniformes ===
Mackerel sharks are an order which includes some of the most familiar species of sharks, such as the great white shark, as well as more unusual representatives, such as the goblin shark and the megamouth shark. Members of the order are distinguished by possessing two dorsal fins, an anal fin, five gill slits, eyes without nictitating membranes, and a mouth extending behind the eyes. Mackerel sharks may also refer specifically to the family Lamnidae.

The order includes seven families and sixteen living species:

- Family Alopiidae Bonaparte, 1838 (Thresher sharks)
- Family Carchariidae Müller & Henle, 1839 (Sand tiger sharks)
- Family Cetorhinidae Gill, 1862 (Basking sharks)
- Family Lamnidae J. P. Müller and Henle, 1838
- Family Megachasmidae Taylor, Compagno & Struhsaker, 1983 (Megamouth shark)
- Family Mitsukurinidae D. S. Jordan, 1898
- Family Odontaspididae Müller & Henle, 1839 (Sand sharks)
- Family Pseudocarchariidae Compagno, 1973 (Crocodile shark)
- Family Cretoxyrhinidae (Extinct)
- Family Otodontidae (Extinct)

=== Order Carcharhiniformes ===
Ground sharks are the largest order of sharks, and include a number of common types such as the blue shark, catsharks, swellsharks and sandbar sharks. Members of the orders are characterized by the presence of a nictitating membrane over the eye, two dorsal fins, an anal fin, and five gill slits. The families in the order Carcharhiniformes are expected to be revised; recent DNA studies show that some of the traditional groups are not monophyletic.

The order includes eight families and over 270 species:

- Family Carcharhinidae (Requiem sharks)
- Family Hemigaleidae (Weasel sharks)
- Family Leptochariidae (Barbeled houndshark)
- Family Proscylliidae (Finback catsharks)
- Family Pseudotriakidae (False catsharks)
- Family Scyliorhinidae (Catsharks)
- Family Sphyrnidae (Hammerhead sharks)
- Family Triakidae (Houndsharks)
