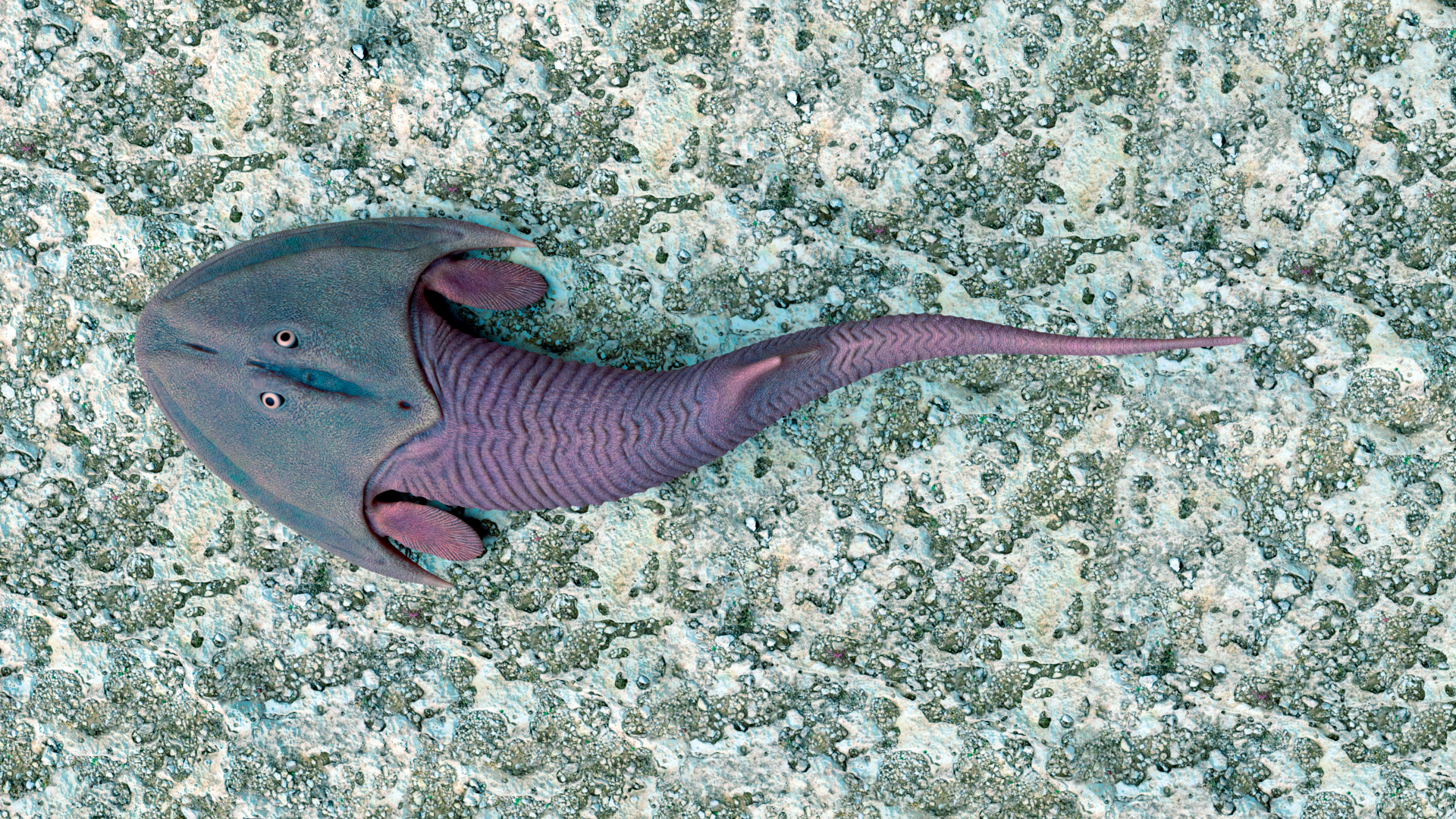

- Digital recreation of Cephalaspis lyelli

Scientific classification
- Kingdom: Animalia
- Phylum: Chordata
- Infraphylum: Agnatha
- Class: †Osteostraci
- Genus: †Cephalaspis; Agassiz, 1835
- Species: †C. lyelli

Binomial name
- †Cephalaspis lyelli Agassiz, 1835

= Cephalaspis =

Cephalaspis Temporal range: Early Devonian (Lochkovian to Emsian), 415–398 Ma

Genus of extinct jawless fish

Cephalaspis (from Greek: κεφαλή kephalḗ, 'head' and Greek: ἀσπίς aspís, 'shield') is an extinct genus of jawless fish. It is the most famous genus of the Osteostraci, an extinct class of Palaeozoic armoured jawless fish ("ostracoderms"). The type species of the genus, C. lyelli was described from the Early Devonian (Lochkovian)-aged Old Red Sandstone of Scotland in 1835. However this species is poorly preserved, and numerous species have since been assigned to the genus based on characters that are common to many osteostracans, making it a wastebasket taxon.

== Description ==
Diagram of an osteostracan headshield. "orb" =orbit/eye socket, "med f." =median field, "lat f."=lateral fields, "cor" =cornual process/horn, "cor.ser"= cornual serrations

The holotype specimen of Cephalaspis lyelli would have been around 24.5 centimetres (9.6 in) long in life. As narrowly defined (sensu stricto) by El Fassi El Fehri and colleagues in 2026, Cephalaspis is defined by the following characteristics: having a headshield with an upper (dorsal) surface that is largely free of tubercles (small bumpy growths), with its rostral part having a tapered profile, with the dorsal median field (the depressed oval-shaped region at the midline of the headshield behind the eyes) being narrow, and the lateral fields (the depressed regions running in a groove near the edge of the upper surface of the headshield) extending onto the cornual horns projecting from the posterior outer edge of the headshield (with these horns being widely shared among members of the Osteostraci subgroup Cornuta). The pineal plate is also fused into the headshield, and the body exoskeleton had a smooth continuous superficial outer layer. As in other osteostracans, it had a pair of pectoral fins.

=== Diet ===
Reconstruction of Cephalaspis lyelli in front-on view

Because its mouth was situated directly beneath its head, Cephalaspis is thought of as being a bottom-feeder, akin to a heavily armoured catfish or sturgeon. It moved its plow-like head from side to side, Cephalaspis easily stirring sand and dust into the water, along with revealing the hiding places of its prey, digging up worms, arthropods, and other invertebrates hidden in the mud and algae, as well as sifting through detritus (inferred from its lack of jaws and inability to bite). Osteostracans likely had the ability to sense electrical fields (electroreception).

== Classification ==
Cephalaspis was the first "ostracoderm" to be scientifically named. The genus Cephalaspis has long been used as a wastebasket taxon since Agassiz erected it in 1835 for four species, C. lyelli, C. rostratus, C. lewisi and C. lloydi, with C. lyelli having been described from remains found in Early Devonian (Lochkovian)-aged Old Red Sandstone near Glamis, Angus in the Midlands Valley of Scotland. Later, it was eventually determined that the last three species were portions of what would eventually be described as the heterostracan Pteraspis rostratus. C. lyelli, named after Sir Charles Lyell, would be left to be the type species of the genus. As the earliest described "ostracoderm", the placement of Cephalaspis was long subject to debate. Agassiz saw it as one of the most primitive known fish, while William Patten in the early 20th century saw it as intermediate between arthropods and fish. Cephalaspis is now placed as a member of the Osteostraci, which contains other similar armoured jawless fish from the Silurian and Devonian periods, recognised as some of the closest known relatives to jawed vertebrates.

Other researchers would continue adding other similar-looking osteostracan species to Cephalaspis over the course of the 19th and 20th centuries, until, in 2009, Sansom reevaluated Osteostraci, and determined that only C. lyelli could be reliably placed within Cephalaspis, and that probably all other species would eventually need to be reexamined and be placed into other genera. In the same 2009 study, Sansom also determined that Cephalaspis sensu stricto was the sister taxon of cornuate osteostracans, i.e., all osteostracans that either have, or have ancestors that had defined corners on the head-shields. A 2026 study of British Cephalaspis species placed a number of former Cephalaspis species into new genera, while regarding three species as valid true members of the genus, the type C. lyelli, as well as Cephalaspis fletti Stensiö 1932 (known from the Lochkovian aged Old Red Sandstone of Shropshire, England) and Cephalaspis producta Wängsjö 1952 (known from the Devonian of Svalbard, Norway).

Below is a cladogram showing the phylogenetic relationships of osteostracans from Sansom (2009) with modifications recovered by Scott & Wilson (2014) and El Fassi El Fehri et al. (2026):

- - Galeaspida
  - - Gnathostomata
    - Osteostraci
      - Ateleaspididae
        - Hirella
        - - Aceraspis
          - Ateleaspis
      - - Hemicyclaspis
        - Cornuata
          - Cephalaspis
          - - - Ymersaspis
              - Saigheadaspis
            - - Zenaspidida
                ⊞
                ⊟
                - Spangenhelmaspis
                - - Platyrhakis
                  - Parameteoraspididae
                    - Parameteoraspis
                    - - Balticaspis
                      - Trewinia
                      - - Escuminaspis
                        - Levesquaspis
                - - Scolenaspis
                  - Ukrainaspis
                  - - Machairaspis
                    - Superciliaspididae
                      - Glabrapelta
                      - - Superciliaspis
                        - Dentapelta
                  - Zenaspididae
                    - Tegaspis
                    - - Stensiopelta
                      - - Diademaspis
                        - Zenaspis
              - - Thyestiida
                  ⊞
                  ⊟
                  - Ilemoraspis
                  - - Procephalaspis
                    - - Auchenaspis
                      - - Thyestes
                        - - Witaaspis
                          - - Tremataspidoidea
                              - Saaremaspis
                              - Tyriaspis
                              - - Aestiaspis
                                - Dartmuthia
                                - - Timanaspis
                                  - - - Oeselaspis
                                      - Tremataspis
                                    - - Dobraspis
                                      - - Sclerodus
                                        - Tannuaspis
                            - Kiaeraspidoidea
                              - Didymaspis
                              - - Kiaeraspis
                                - Norselaspis
                                - - Nectaspis
                                  - - Axinaspis
                                    - - Acrotomaspis
                                      - Gustavaspis
                - - - - Hildenaspis
                      - Mimetaspis
                    - - Zychaspis
                      - - Pattenaspis
                        - Rochtarge
                  - - - Waengsjoeaspis
                      - - Camptaspis
                        - Yvonaspis
                    - Benneviaspidida
                      ⊞
                      ⊟
                      - Ectinaspis
                      - - Securiaspis
                        - - "Benneviaspis" longicornis
                          - - - "Benneviaspis" anglica
                              - - "Benneviaspis" lankesteri
                                - Benneviaspis
                            - Boreaspidoidei
                              - Hoelaspis
                              - Severaspis
                              - - "Boreaspis" ceratops
                                - "Boreaspis" intermedia
                                - Boreaspis
                                - Dicranaspis
                                - - Spatulaspis
                                  - - Belonaspis
                                    - - Hapilaspis
                                      - Tauraspis

=== Included species ===
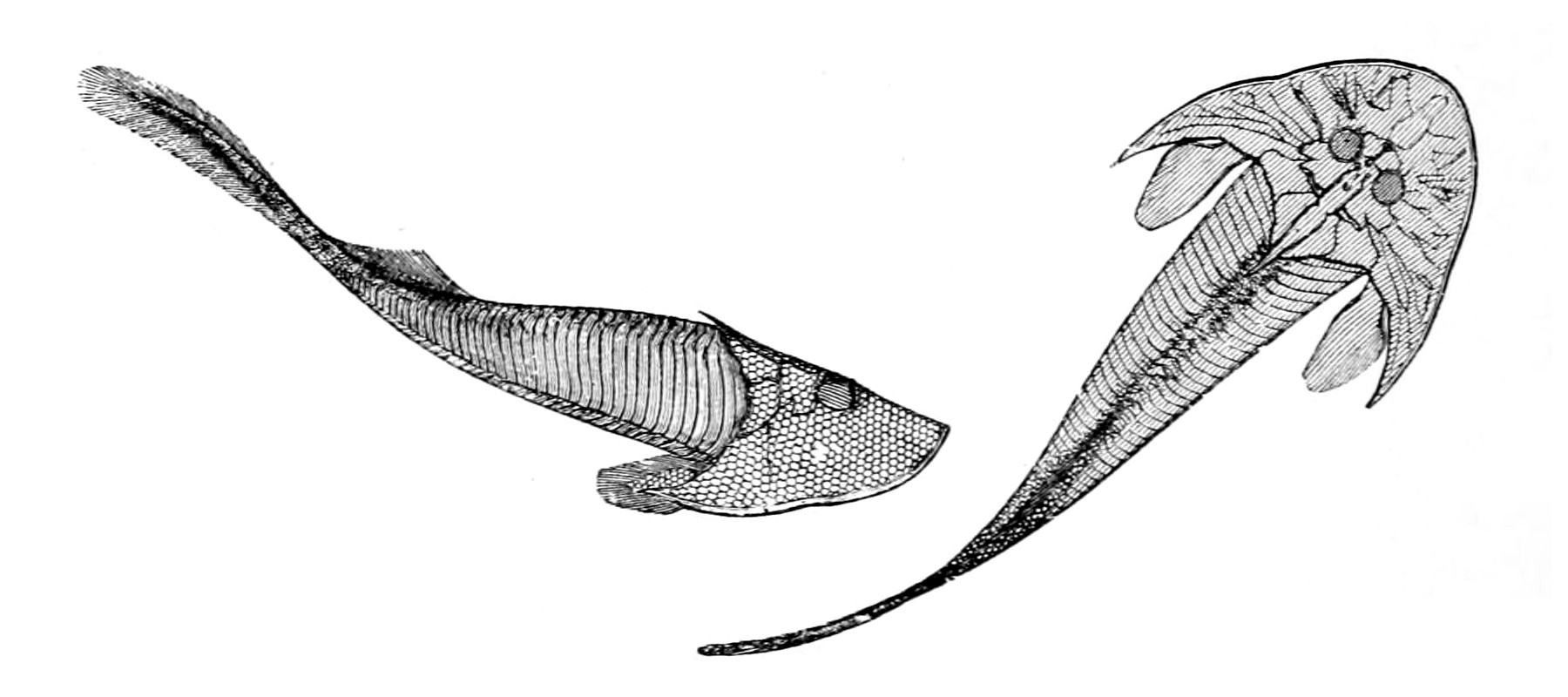
Cephalaspis lyellii reconstruction

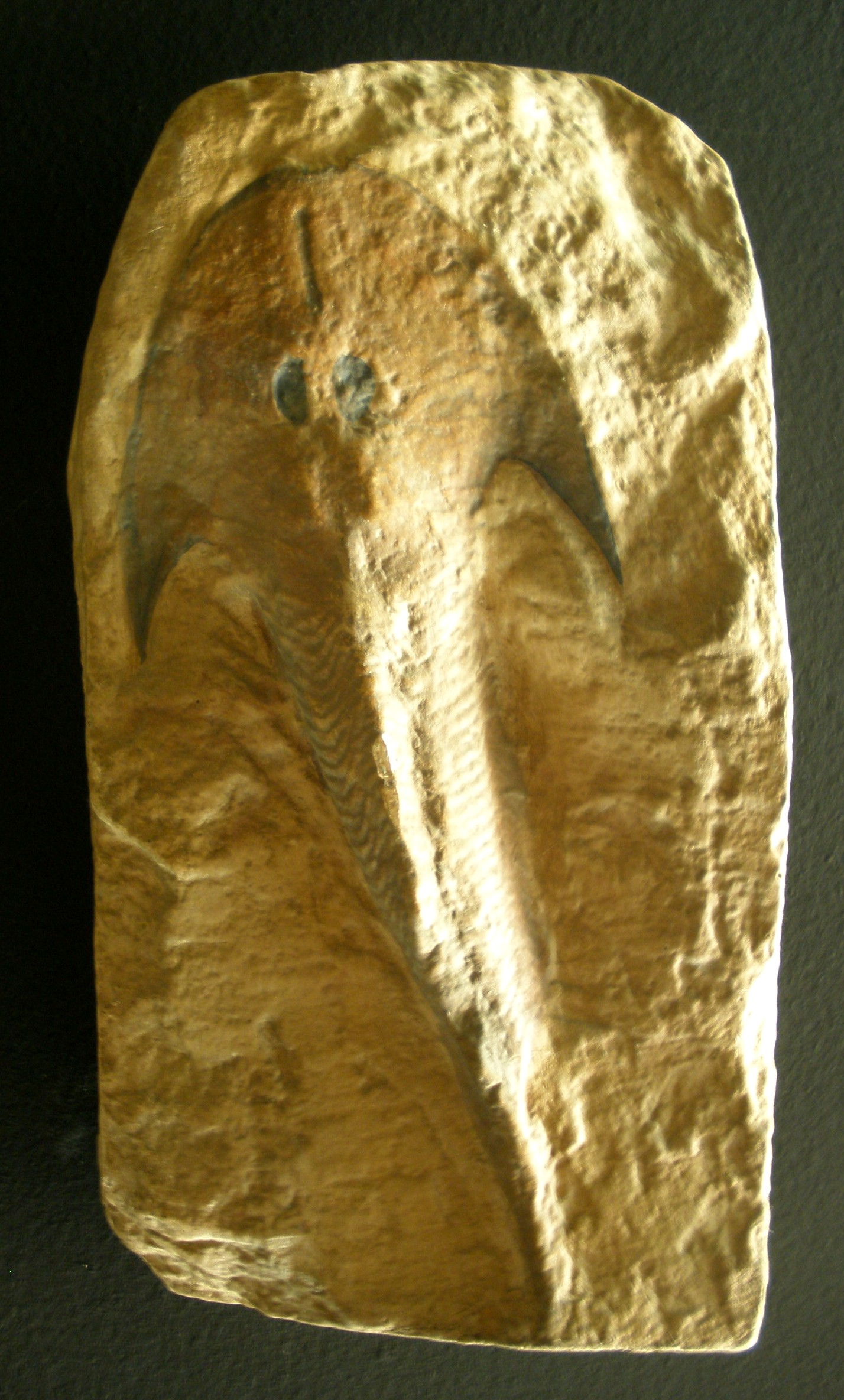
Cephalaspis lyelli fossil

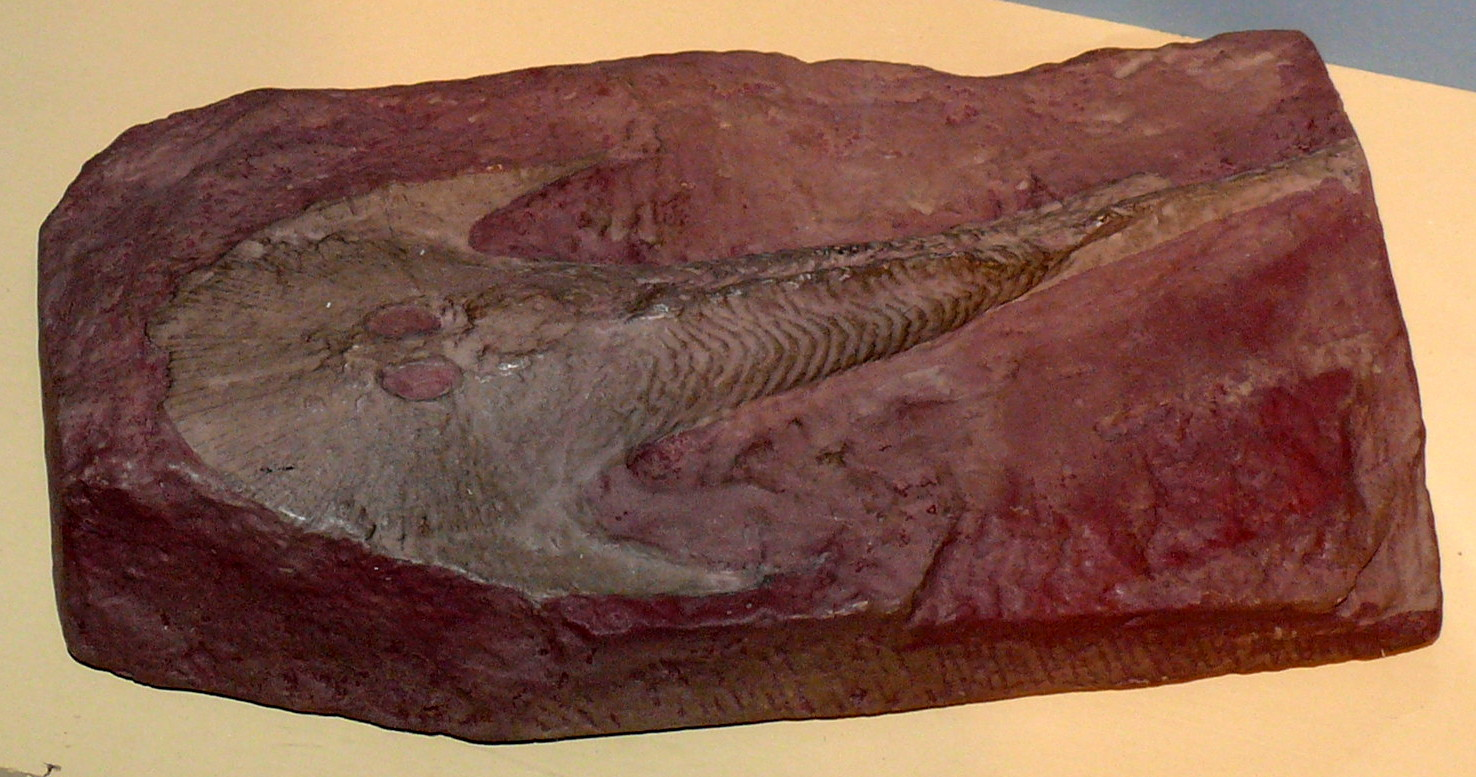
Cephalaspis lyelli fossil

The following is a list of species that have been included into Cephalaspis; most likely do not belong to the genus, but have not been formally moved.

- †Cephalaspis lyelli (Agassiz, 1835) (type species)
- †"Cephalaspis" aarhusi (Wangsjö, 1952)
- †"Cephalaspis" brevirostris (Denison, 1952)
- †"Cephalaspis" broughi (Wangsjö, 1952)
- †Cephalaspis cradleyensis (Stensiö, 1932)
- †"Cephalaspis" dissimulata (Wangsjö, 1952)
- †"Cephalaspis" doryphorus (Wangsjö, 1952)
- †"Cephalaspis" fletti (Stensiö, 1932)
- †"Cephalaspis" fraticornis (Wangsjö, 1952)
- †"Cephalaspis" hyperboreus (Wangsjö, 1952)
- †"Cephalaspis" lankestri (Stensiö, 1932)
- †"Cephalaspis" lornensis (Traquair, 1899)
- †"Cephalaspis" microlepidota (Balabai, 1962)
- †"Cephalaspis" novaescotiae (Denison, 1955)
- †"Cephalaspis" platycephalus (Wangsjö, 1952)
- †"Cephalaspis" producta (Wangsjö, 1952)
- †"Cephalaspis" recticornis (Wangsjö, 1952)
- †"Cephalaspis" tenuicornis (Wangsjö, 1952)
- †"Cephalaspis" verrulosa (Wangsjö, 1952)
- †"Cephalaspis" whitbachensis (Stensiö, 1932)
- †"Cephalaspis" wyomingensis (Denison, 1952)

=== Species of Cephalaspis that have been reassigned ===
- †Cephalaspis agassizi (Lankester, 1868) = Ymersaspis agassizi
- †Cephalaspis corystis (Wangsjö, 1952) = Machairaspis corystis
- †Cephalaspis cwmmillensis (White & Toombs, 1983) = cwmmillensis
- †Cephalaspis excellens (Wangsjö, 1952) = Waengsjoeaspis excellens
- †Cephalaspis elegans (Balabai, 1962) = Zychaspis siemiradzkii
- †Cephalaspis gabrielsei (Dineley & Loeffler, 1976) = Superciliaspis grabrielsei (Adrain and Wilson, 1994)
- †Cephalaspis hastata (Wangsjö, 1952) = Machairaspis hastata
- †Cephalaspis hoeli (Stensiö, 1927) = Mimetaspis hoeli
- †Cephalaspis ibex (Wangsjö, 1952) = Machairaspis ibex
- †Cephalaspis jarviki (Wangsjö, 1952) = Diademaspis jarviki
- †Cephalaspis magnifica (Traquair, 1893) = Trewinia magnifica
- †Cephalaspis microtuberculata (Obruchev, 1961) = Escuminaspis laticeps
- †Cephalaspis pagei (Lankester, 1868) = Janaspis pagei
- †Cephalaspis patteni (Robertson, 1936) = Levesquaspis patteni
- †Cephalaspis powriei (Lankester, 1868) = Janaspis powriei
- †Cephalaspis rosamundae (Roberts, 1937) = Escuminaspis laticeps
- †Cephalaspis rostrata (Agassiz, 1835) = Pteraspis rostrata
- †Cephalaspis salweyi (Egerton, 1857) = Zenaspis salweyi
- †Cephalaspis spinifer (Stensiö, 1932) = Rochtarge spinifer
- †Cephalaspis traquairi (Stensiö, 1932) = Platyrhakis traquairi
- †Cephalaspis utahensis (Branson & Mehl, 1931) = Camptaspis utahensis
- †Cephalaspis watsoni (Stensiö, 1932) = Rochtarge watsoni
- †Cephalaspis websteri (Stensiö, 1932) = Saigheadaspis websteri

=== Other miscellaneous species once assigned to Cephalaspis ===
- †Cephalaspis abergavenniensis (White, 1963)
- †Cephalaspis acuticornis (Stensiö, 1927)
- †Cephalaspis billcrofti (White & Toombs, 1983)
- †Cephalaspis campbelltonensis (Whiteaves, 1881)
- †Cephalaspis cocculi (MacGillivray, 1921)
- †Cephalaspis dawsoni (Lankester, 1870)
- †Cephalaspis djurinensis (Balabai, 1962)
- †Cephalaspis isachseni (Stensiö, 1927)
- †Cephalaspis jexi (Traquair, 1893)
- †Cephalaspis peninsula (Pageau, 1969)
- †Cephalaspis schrenckii (Pander, ?)
- †Cephalaspis sp. "Forfar" (Trewin & Davidson, 1996)
- †Cephalaspis syndenhami (Pageau, 1969)
- †Cephalaspis uternaria (?)
- †Cephalaspis vogti (Stensiö, 1927)
- †Cephalaspis watneliei (Stensiö, 1927)
- †Cephalaspis westolli (Russell, 1954)
