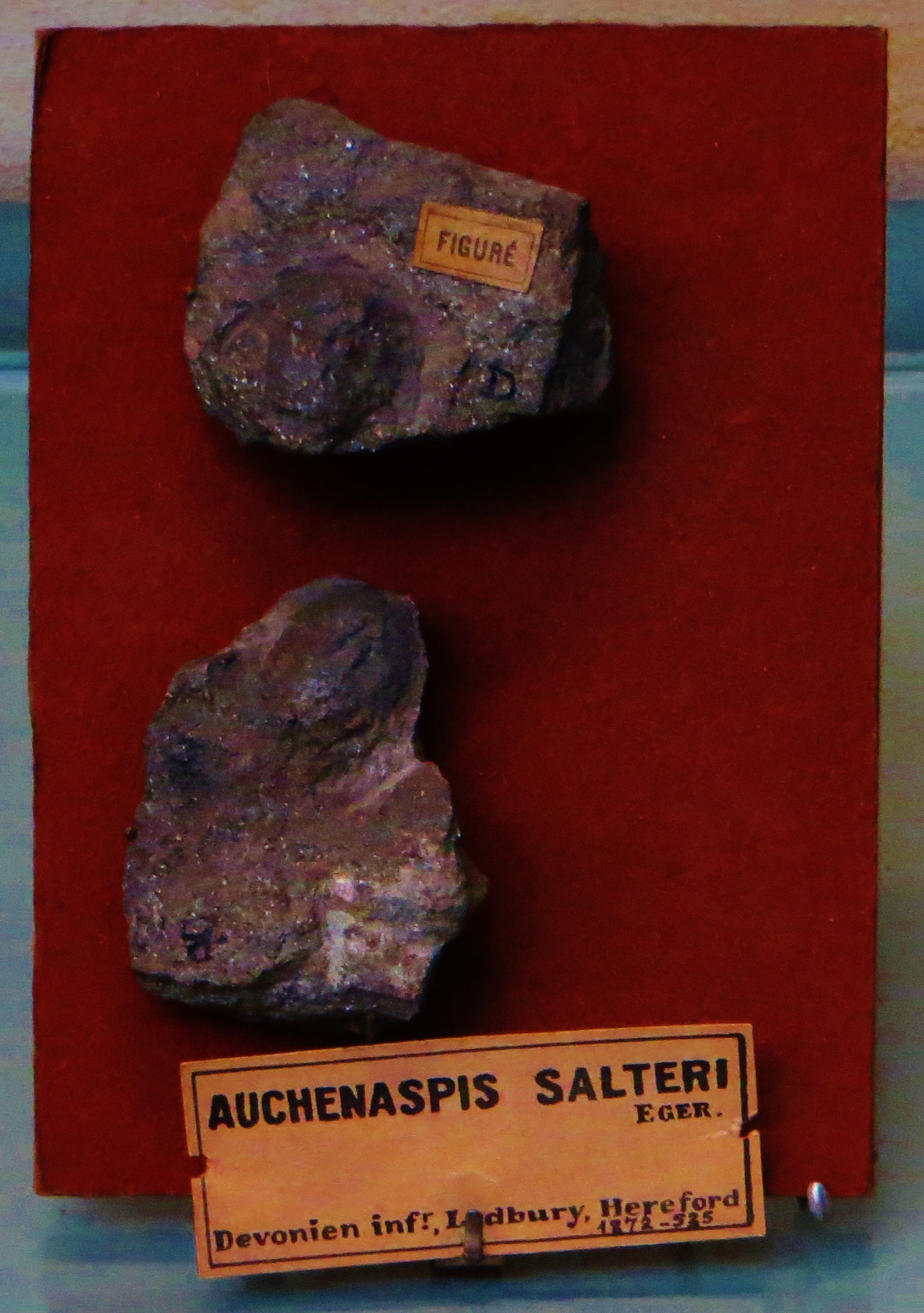
- Fossils at National Museum of Natural History, Paris

Scientific classification
- Kingdom: Animalia
- Phylum: Chordata
- Infraphylum: Agnatha
- Class: †Osteostraci
- Order: †Thyestiida
- Genus: †Auchenaspis; Egerton 1857

= Auchenaspis =

Auchenaspis Temporal range: 443.7–416.0 Ma Silurian

Extinct genus of jawless fishes

Auchenaspis salteri is an extinct species of armored jawless fish of the order Thyestiida from the Late Silurian of England. In England, A. salteri's fossils are found in extreme abundance in the Lower Old Red Sandstone strata in Ledbury, Herefordshire.

A. salteri strongly resembles the thyestiids Procephalaspis and Thyestes, and within Thyestiida, it represents a transitional form between the primitive, superficially Cephalaspis-like forms, such as Thyestes, and the more specialized tremataspid thyestiids, like Tremataspis, Dartmuthia, or Dobraspis, whose headshields tend to resemble hot buns or horseshoe crabs.
