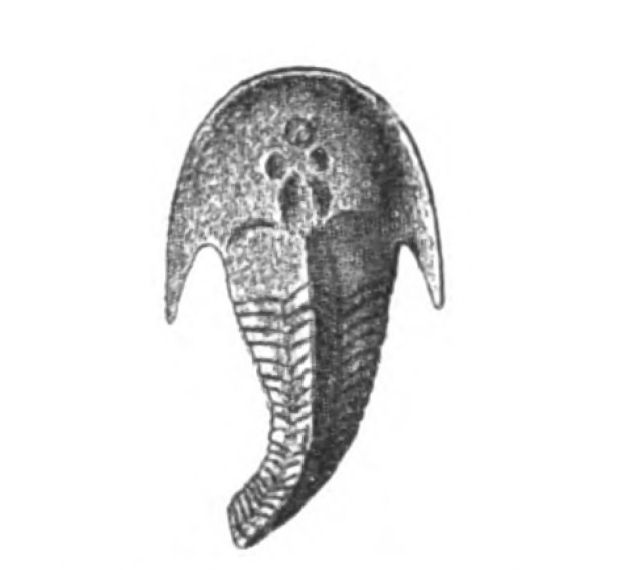
- Auchenaspis sp. from The Origin of Vertebrates by Walter Holbrook Gaskell 1908, Fig. 13, from Woodward)

Scientific classification
- Domain: Eukaryota
- Kingdom: Animalia
- Phylum: Chordata
- Infraphylum: Agnatha
- Superclass: †Cephalaspidomorphi
- Class: †Osteostraci
- Order: †Thyestiida; Janvier 1996

Families
- †Tannuaspididae; †Thyestiidae; †Tremataspididae

= Thyestiida =

Order of jawless fishes

Thyestiida is an order of bony-armored jawless fish in the extinct vertebrate class Osteostraci.

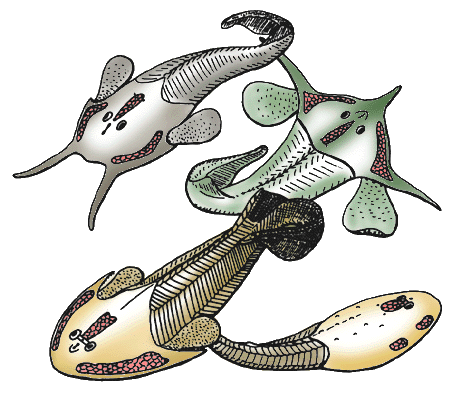
The osteostracans reconstructed here belong to the major clade Cornuata, whose generalised morphology is exemplified by the zenaspidid Zenaspis (bottom left). Some highly derived head-shield morphologies are exemplified by the benneviaspidids Hoelaspis (top right) and Tauraspis (top left), or the thyestiid Tremataspis (bottom right). The latter, of the family Tremataspididae, has lost the paired fins, possibly as a consequence of an adaptation to burrowing habits.

Thyestiida

- Thyestiida
  - Illemoraspis
  - - Procephalaspis
    - - Auchenaspis
      - - Thyestes
        - - Witaaspis
          - - Tremataspidoidea
              - Saaremaspis
              - Tyriaspis
              - - Aestiaspis
                - Dartmuthia
                - - Timanaspis
                  - - - Oeselaspis
                      - Tremataspis
                    - - Dobraspis
                      - - Sclerodus
                        - Tannuaspis
            - Kiaeraspidoidea
              - Didymaspis
              - - Kiaeraspis
                - Norselaspis
                - - Nectaspis
                  - - Axinaspis
                    - - Acrotomaspis
                      - Gustavaspis

Cladogram, according to Sansom, 2009
