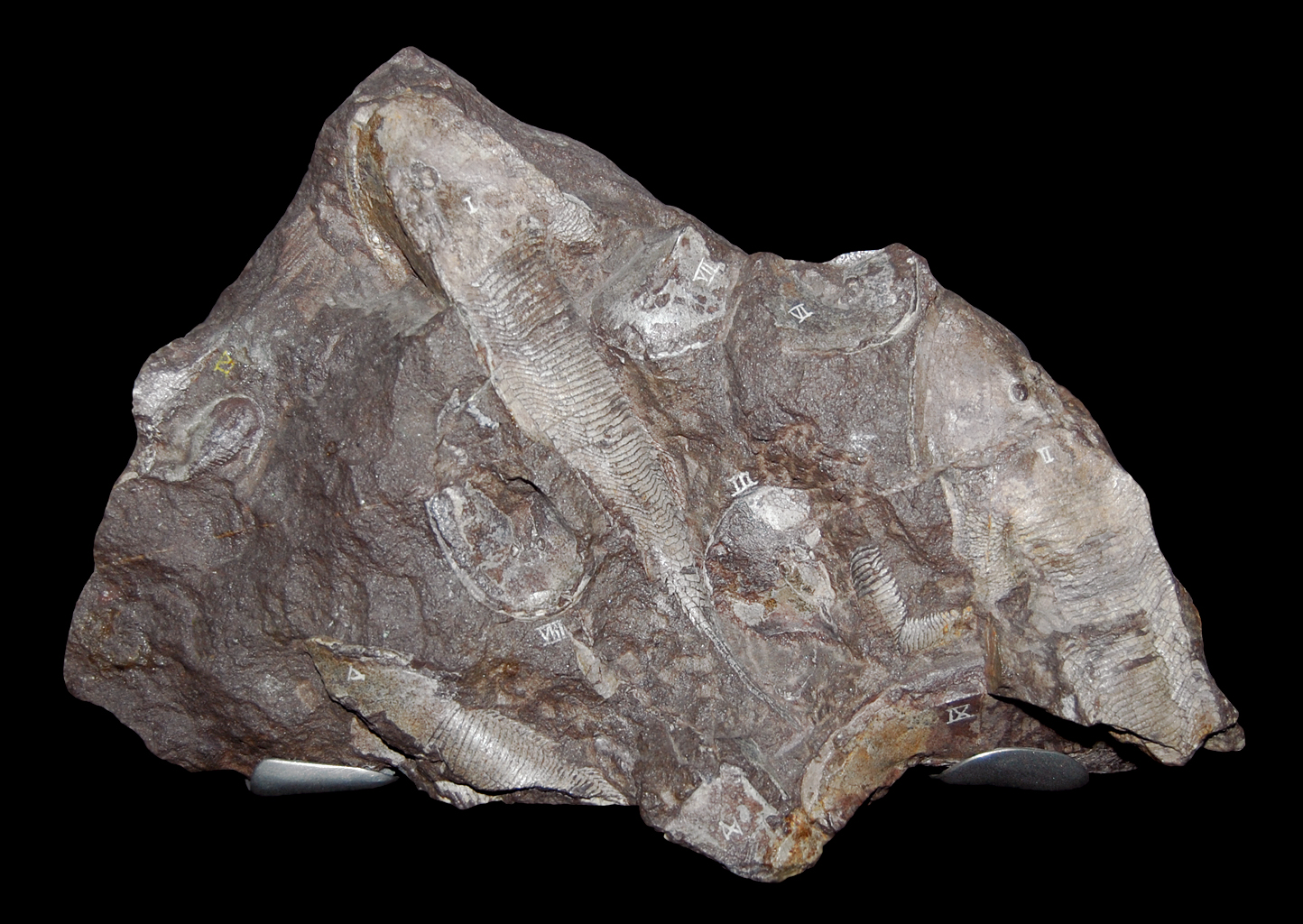
- H. murchisoni and Thyestes
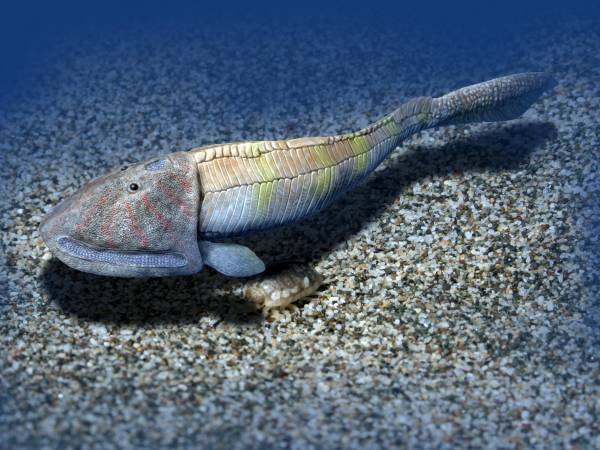
- Life reconstruction.

Scientific classification
- Domain: Eukaryota
- Kingdom: Animalia
- Phylum: Chordata
- Infraphylum: Agnatha
- Class: †Osteostraci
- Order: †Atelaspidiformes
- Family: †Ateleaspididae
- Genus: †Hemicyclaspis

= Hemicyclaspis =

Hemicyclaspis Temporal range: Pridoli–Early Devonian

Extinct genus of jawless fishes

Hemicyclaspis (lit. 'half-round shield' or 'semicircle plate') is an extinct genus of primitive jawless fish, closely related to Cephalaspis, that lived in the Late Silurian (Pridoli) to Devonian period in what is now Europe and North America. A typical cephalaspid, Hemicyclaspis had a heavily armored, shovel-shaped headshield. It is thought to have been a better swimmer than most of its relatives because of its powerful tail, stabilizing dorsal fin and the keel-shaped hydrodynamic edges of its head shield. Hemicyclaspis probably foraged the ocean floor for food.

Hemicyclaspis grew to a length of 5 inches (13 centimeters) and would most likely have fed on particles from the muddy sea bed.

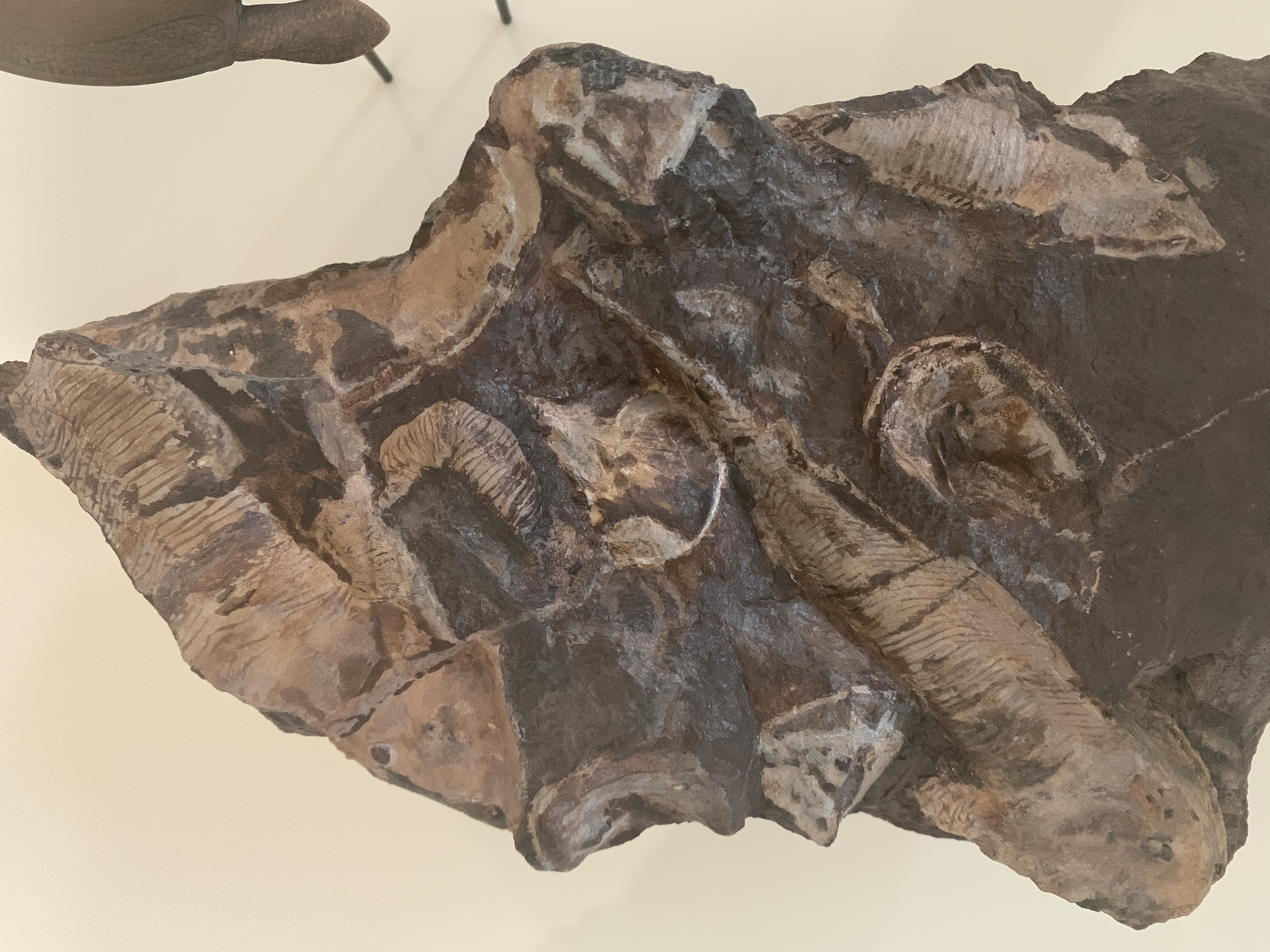
H. murchisoni cast. Collected from Ledbury, Herefordshire, England.

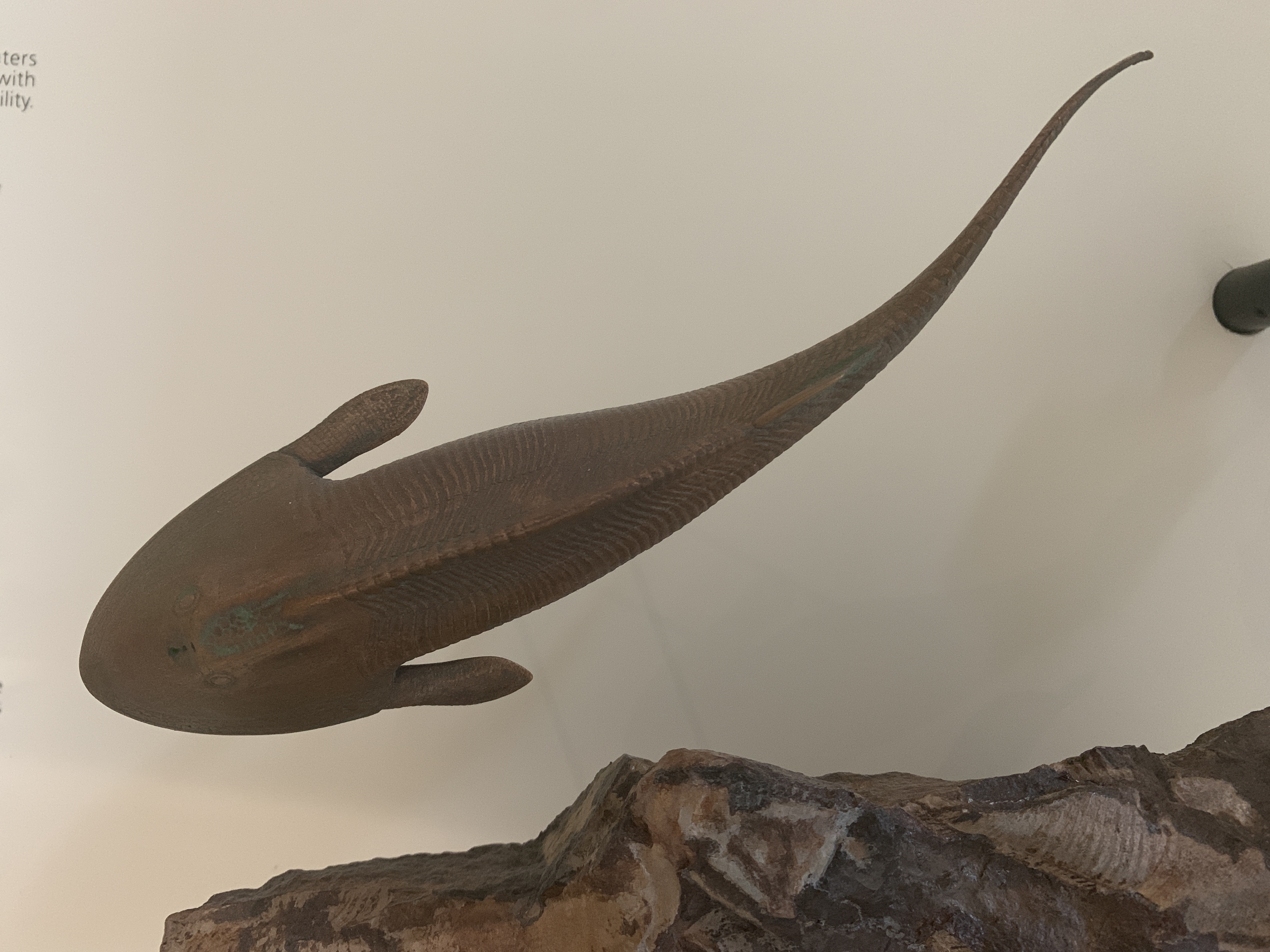
1953 plaster reconstruction.
