= Djurinaspis =

Djurinaspis Temporal range: Early Devonian

Scientific classification
- Kingdom: Animalia
- Phylum: Chordata
- Infraphylum: Agnatha
- Class: †Osteostraci
- Order: †Zenaspidida
- Family: †Zenaspididae
- Genus: †Djurinaspis; Novitskaya, 1983

Extinct genus of jawless fishes

Djurinaspis is an extinct genus of osteostracan jawless fish that existed during the early Devonian period. It was originally described by L. I. Novitskaya in 1983. A new species, D. secunda, from Ukraine was described by Victor Voichyshyn in 2011.
