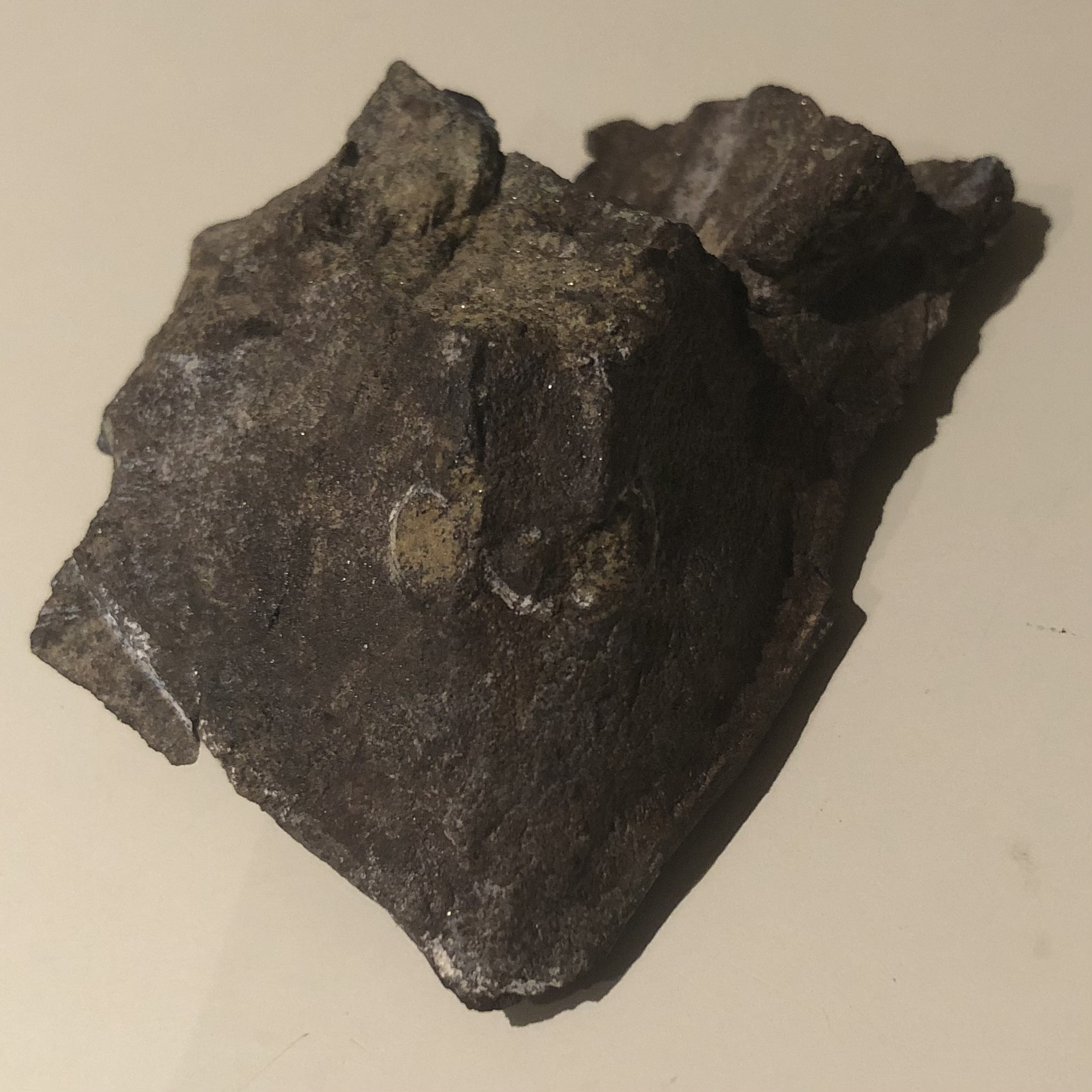
- Dorsal view of W. janvieri
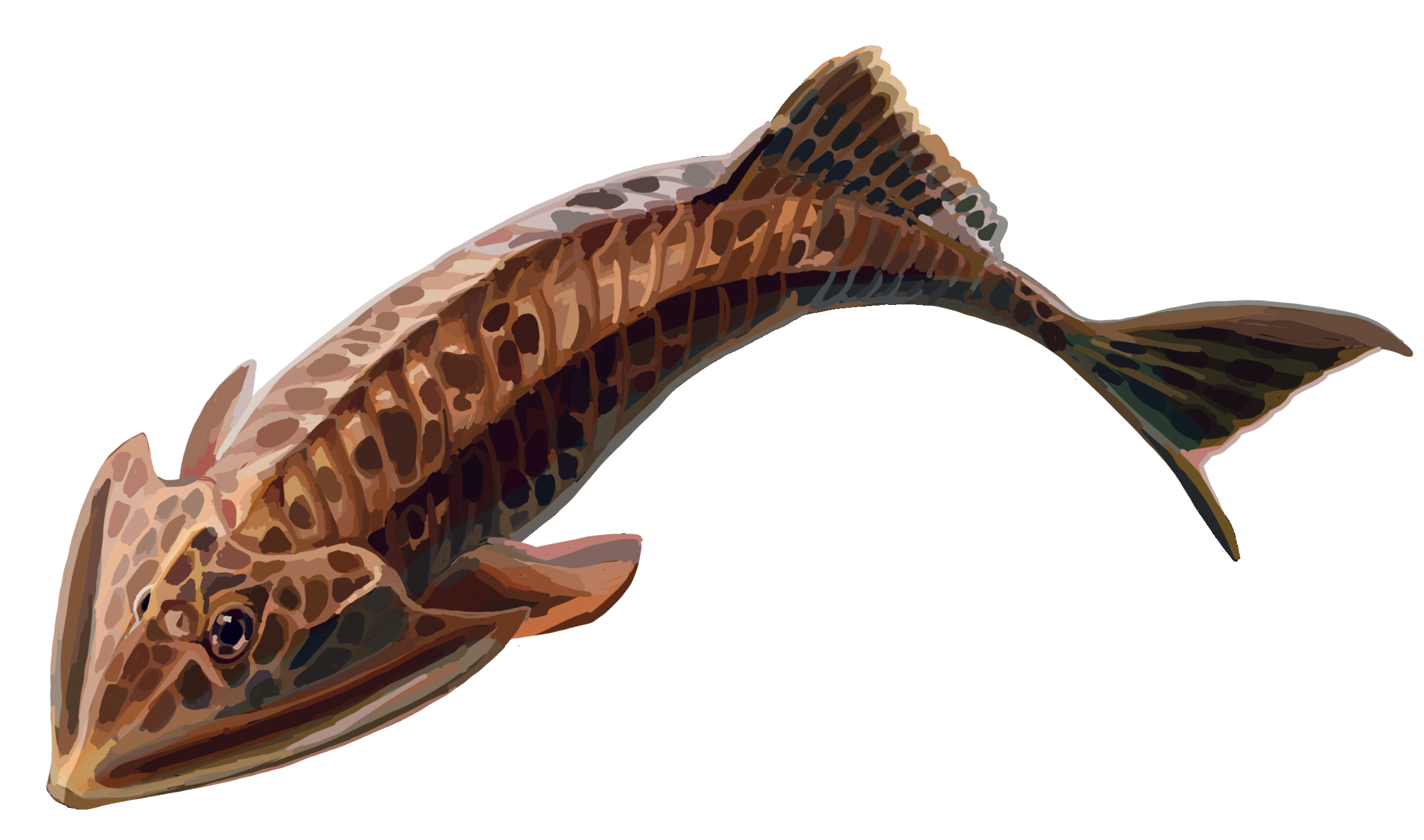
- Artist's reconstruction of W. janvieri

Scientific classification
- Kingdom: Animalia
- Phylum: Chordata
- Infraphylum: Agnatha
- Class: †Osteostraci
- Order: †Zenaspidida
- Family: †Parameteoraspididae
- Genus: †Wladysagitta; Voichyshyn, 2006

Type species
- †Wladysagitta janvieri Victor Voichyshyn, 2006

= Wladysagitta =

Wladysagitta Temporal range: Early Devonian

Extinct genus of jawless fish

Wladysagitta is an extinct genus of osteostracan jawless fish that existed during the lower Devonian period of what is now Podolia, Ukraine. This taxon was named in honor of Polish paleontologist Dr. Władysław Zych (1899–1981), and from the Latin sagitta, meaning arrow, which is in reference to the arrow-like shape of its skull.

== Description ==
Wladysagitta, like other osteostracans, possesses very advanced features for an agnathan; namely, an armored headshield with complicated cranial anatomy, paired fins and rows of plated scales. It is remarkable among osteostracans for possessing a rostral process, a beaklike structure unusual for this class, which usually possesses blunted, horseshoe-shaped headshields. It is also distinct for being ornamented by a number of unusually prominent, thornlike tubercles on its headshield as preserved in some specimens. Like its relatives, its flat, spade-like head, dorsally orientated eye sockets and lack of jaws indicate that it was probably a benthic, bottom-feeding animal, and given its taxonomic placement, it likely made its home in marine environments.

Wladysagitta is relatively small in size compared to other osteostracans. The headshield of the holotype is around 40–60 mm (1.6–2.4 in) long and approximately the same in width, though slightly larger specimens do exist.

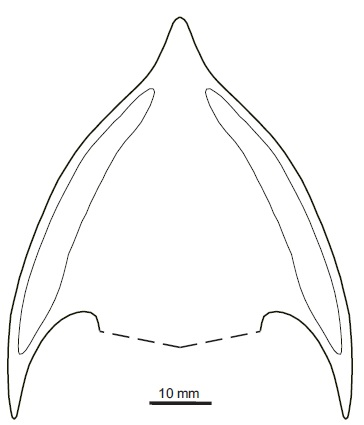
Reconstruction of the headshield of W. janvieri

== Species ==
This genus includes only two described species: W. janvieri and W. acutirostris. The type species, W. janvieri, is comparatively larger, broader and has a more pronounced rostral structure, whereas W. acutirostris is slightly smaller, narrower and has a more blunted headshield shape. The two species have similar headshield curvatures and, due to the poorly preserved rostral process of W. acutirostris, the differences between them are still somewhat unclear.
