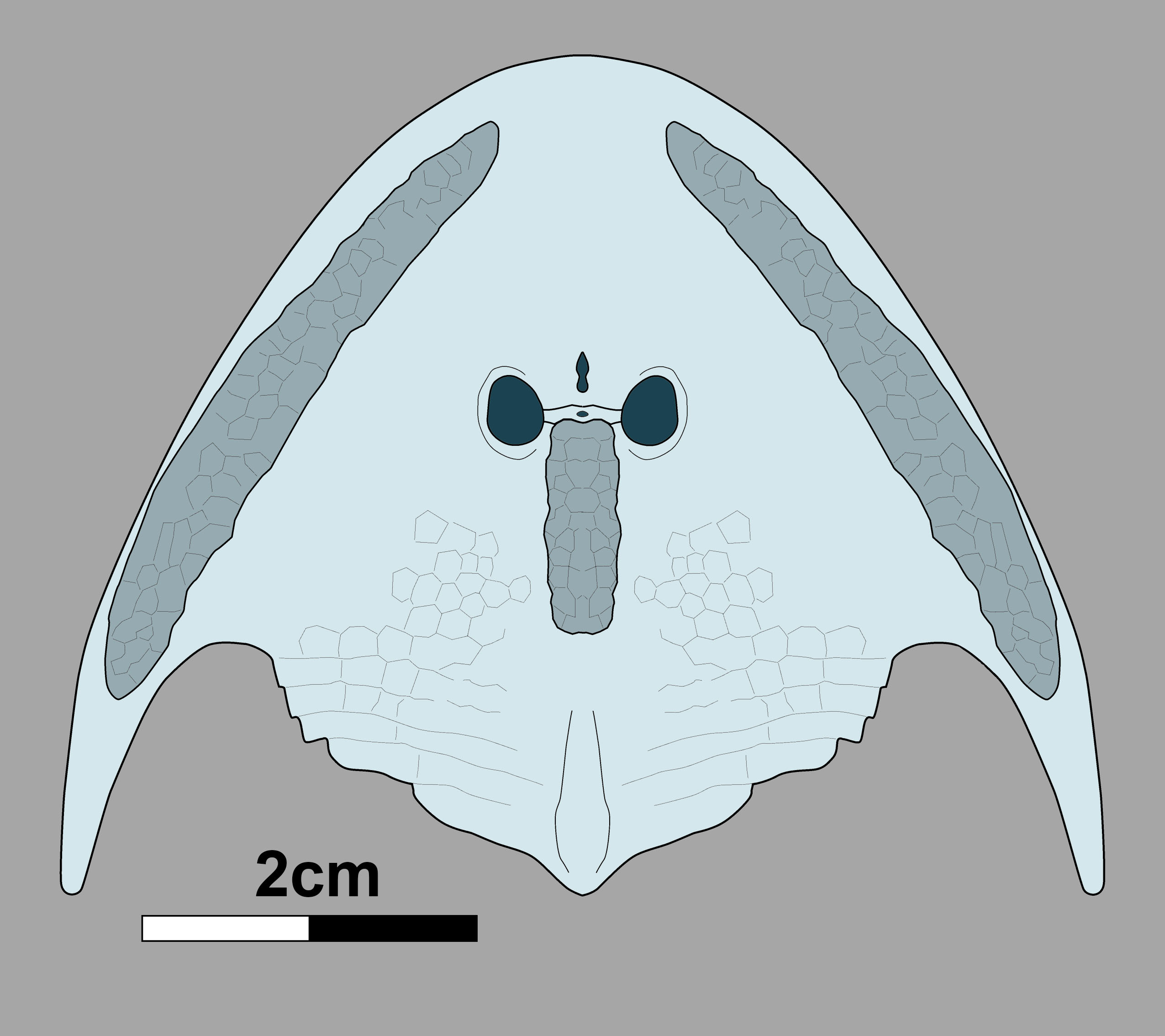
- Headshield reconstruction

Scientific classification
- Kingdom: Animalia
- Phylum: Chordata
- Infraphylum: Agnatha
- Class: †Osteostraci
- Order: †Zenaspidida
- Family: †Zenaspididae
- Genus: †Janaspis

Type species
- Janaspis pagei

Species
- Janaspis pagei; Janaspis punctata; Janaspis newtonensis

= Janaspis =

Janaspis Temporal range: Early Devonian

Extinct genus of jawless fishes

Janaspis is an extinct genus of osteostracan, that lived in the early Devonian period in Britain. It is characterised by a number of features of its armoured headshield, including the presence of raised rims around its eyes, the shape of its lateral and median fields (depressed areas of the headshield covered by small loose plates, which are common to most Osteostraci), its prominent dorsal spine, fairly long cornual processes (backwards pointing spines on each side of the headshield) and ornamentation. Janaspis was fairly small compared with other osteostracans, with a headshield measuring less than 60mm.
