= Zychaspis =

Zychaspis Temporal range: 412.3–409.1 Ma

Scientific classification
- Kingdom: Animalia
- Phylum: Chordata
- Class: †Osteostraci
- Subclass: †Cornuata
- Order: †Cephalaspidida
- Family: †Scolenaspididae
- Genus: †Zychaspis Janvier, 1985

Species
- †Zychaspis bucovinensis (Vascautanu, 1931); †Zychaspis elegans (Balabai, 1962)

Extinct genus of jawless fishes

Zychaspis is an extinct genus of Devonian jawless fishes. The genus name, Zychaspis, was named as a tribute to palaeontologist Władysław Zych (1899 – 1981).

== Species ==
Two species of this genus, Z. bucovinensis and Z. elegans are known from the Devonian-aged rocks of Ukraine. Z. bucovinensis is known primarily from the Babin Sandstone. Z. elegans (which was once known as Cephalaspis elegans (Balabai, 1962)) can be found in a wider variety rocks on the Podolian plateau.
