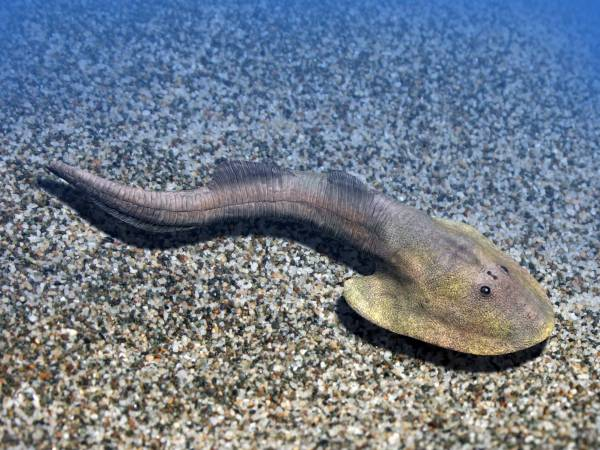
- Ateleaspis tessellata

Scientific classification
- Kingdom: Animalia
- Phylum: Chordata
- Infraphylum: Agnatha
- Class: †Osteostraci
- Order: †Atelaspidiformes
- Family: †Ateleaspididae
- Genus: †Ateleaspis; Traquair, 1899
- Species: †A. tessellata

Binomial name
- †Ateleaspis tessellata Traquair, 1899

= Ateleaspis =

Ateleaspis Temporal range: Wenlock epoch to Lower Devonian 440–371.9 Ma

Extinct genus of jawless fishes

Ateleaspis is an extinct genus of primitive ostracoderm fish that lived in the Silurian period (Wenlock Epoch) to the Lower Devonian. Like other ostracoderms, Ateleaspis had a head shield similar to that of Cephalaspis. Species from Silurian period were found in Norway and Scotland, but now has been found also in Siberia from Early Devonian period.

== Description ==
Ateleaspis possibly is the most basal vertebrate with paired fins. Ateleaspis was a small fish (about 15 – 20 cm) and had a flat headshield and a narrow trunk covered by brick-like scales.
