= Yoglinia =

Yoglinia Temporal range: Middle Devonian–Late Devonian

Scientific classification
- Kingdom: Animalia
- Phylum: Chordata
- Infraphylum: Agnatha
- Class: †Pteraspidomorpha
- Subclass: †Heterostraci
- Order: †Pteraspidiformes
- Genus: †Yoglinia; Obruchev, 1943

Species of prehistoric jawless fish

Yoglinia is a genus of prehistoric jawless fish that lived in the Middle to late Devonian of modern-day Europe.
