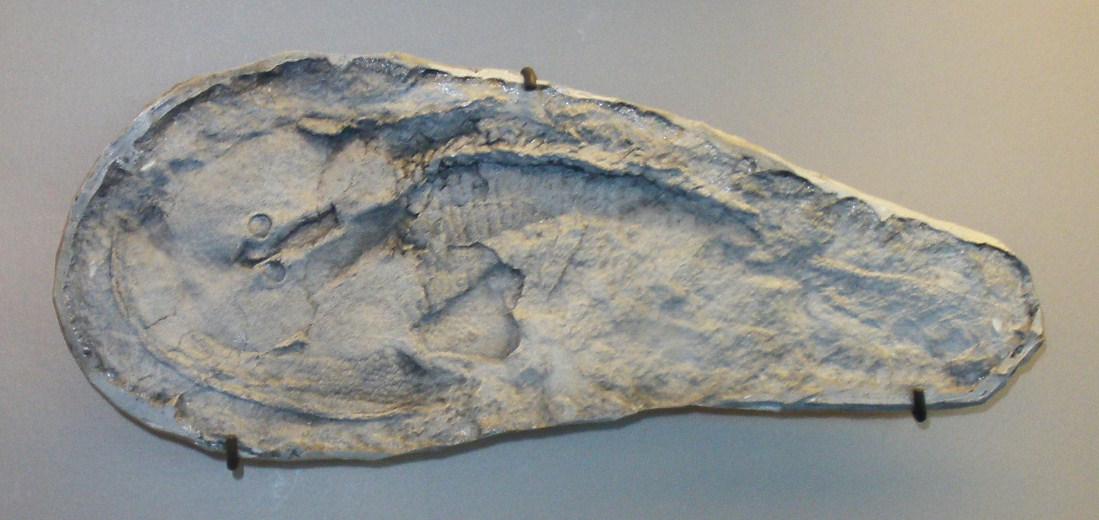
- Fossil of Zenaspis powriei

Scientific classification
- Kingdom: Animalia
- Phylum: Chordata
- Infraphylum: Agnatha
- Class: †Osteostraci
- Order: †Zenaspidida
- Family: †Zenaspididae; Stensiö, 1958

Genera
- Diademaspis; Djurinaspis; Janaspis; Machairaspis; Scolenaspis; Stensiopelta; Superciliaspis; Tegaspis; Ukrainaspis; Zenaspis

= Zenaspididae =

Extinct family of jawless fishes

Zenaspididae is an extinct family of jawless fish in the order Zenaspidida.

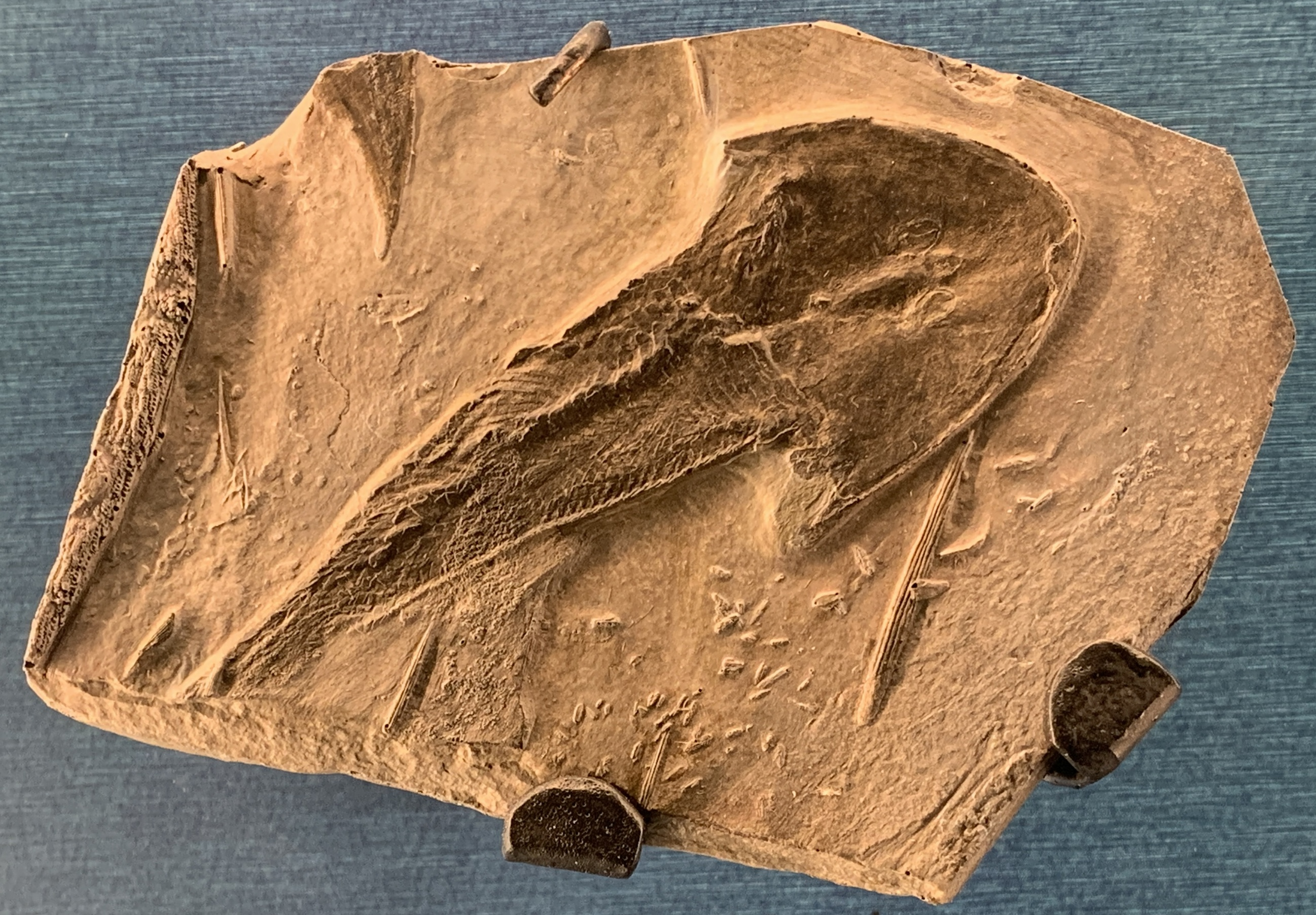
Diademaspis mackenziensis cast. Early Devonian, Mackenzie Mountains, Northwest Territories (Canada). At the Royal Tyrrell Museum of Palaeontology.
