= Superciliaspis =

Superciliaspis gabrielsi Temporal range: Lochkovian

Scientific classification
- Kingdom: Animalia
- Phylum: Chordata
- Infraphylum: Agnatha
- Class: †Osteostraci
- Order: †Zenaspidida
- Family: †Superciliaspididae
- Genus: †Superciliaspis; Adrain & Wilson, 1994
- Species: †S. gabrielsi

Binomial name
- †Superciliaspis gabrielsi (Dineley & Loeffler, 1976)

Synonyms
- Cephalaspis? gabrielsi Dineley & Loeffler, 1976

Extinct genus of jawless fishes

Superciliaspis is an extinct genus of jawless fish which existed in what is now the Northwest Territories of Canada during the Lochkovian age. It hails from the MOTH locality in the Mackenzie Mountains. Originally identified as a species of Cephalaspis (C. gabrielsi) by Dineley and Loeffler in 1976, it was reassigned to Superciliaspis gabrielsi by Adrain and Wilson in 1994.
