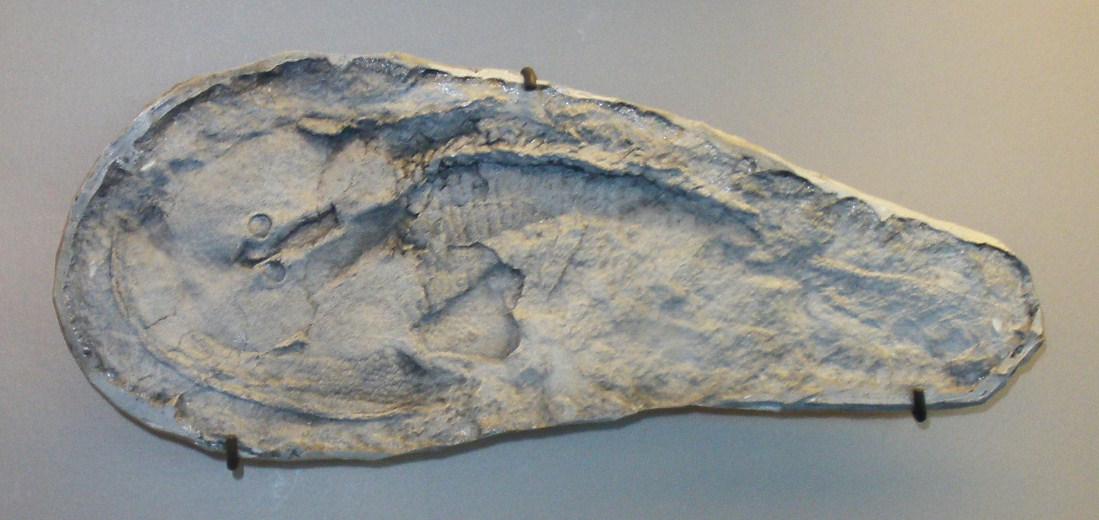
- Fossil of Zenaspis
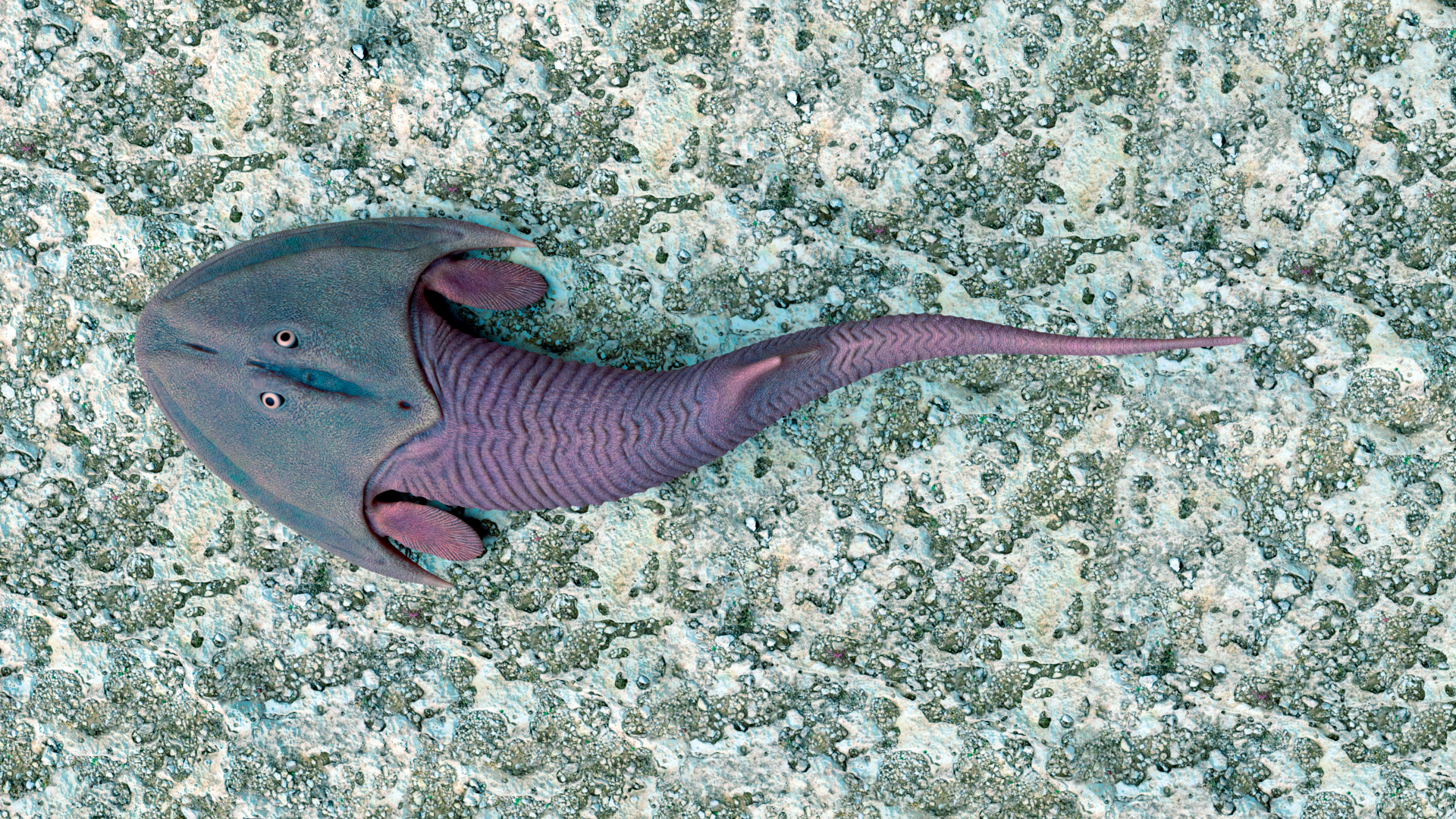
- Reconstruction of Cephalaspis

Scientific classification
- Kingdom: Animalia
- Phylum: Chordata
- Infraphylum: Agnatha
- Class: †Osteostraci; Lankester, 1868

Subdivisions
- See text

Synonyms
- Osteostracida; Cephalaspidiformes

= Osteostraci =

Osteostraci Temporal range: Silurian, Llandovery (Raikkula)–Late Devonian (Frasnian)

Extinct class of jawless fishes

The class Osteostraci (meaning "bony shells") is an extinct taxon of bony-armored jawless fish, one of several groups termed "ostracoderms", that lived in what is now North America, Europe and Russia (largely around the former landmass of Euramerica/Laurussia) from the Middle Silurian to Late Devonian.

== Description ==
Diagram of an osteostracan headshield. "orb" =orbit/eye socket, "med f." =median field, "lat f."=lateral fields, "cor" =cornual process/horn, "cor.ser"= cornual serrations

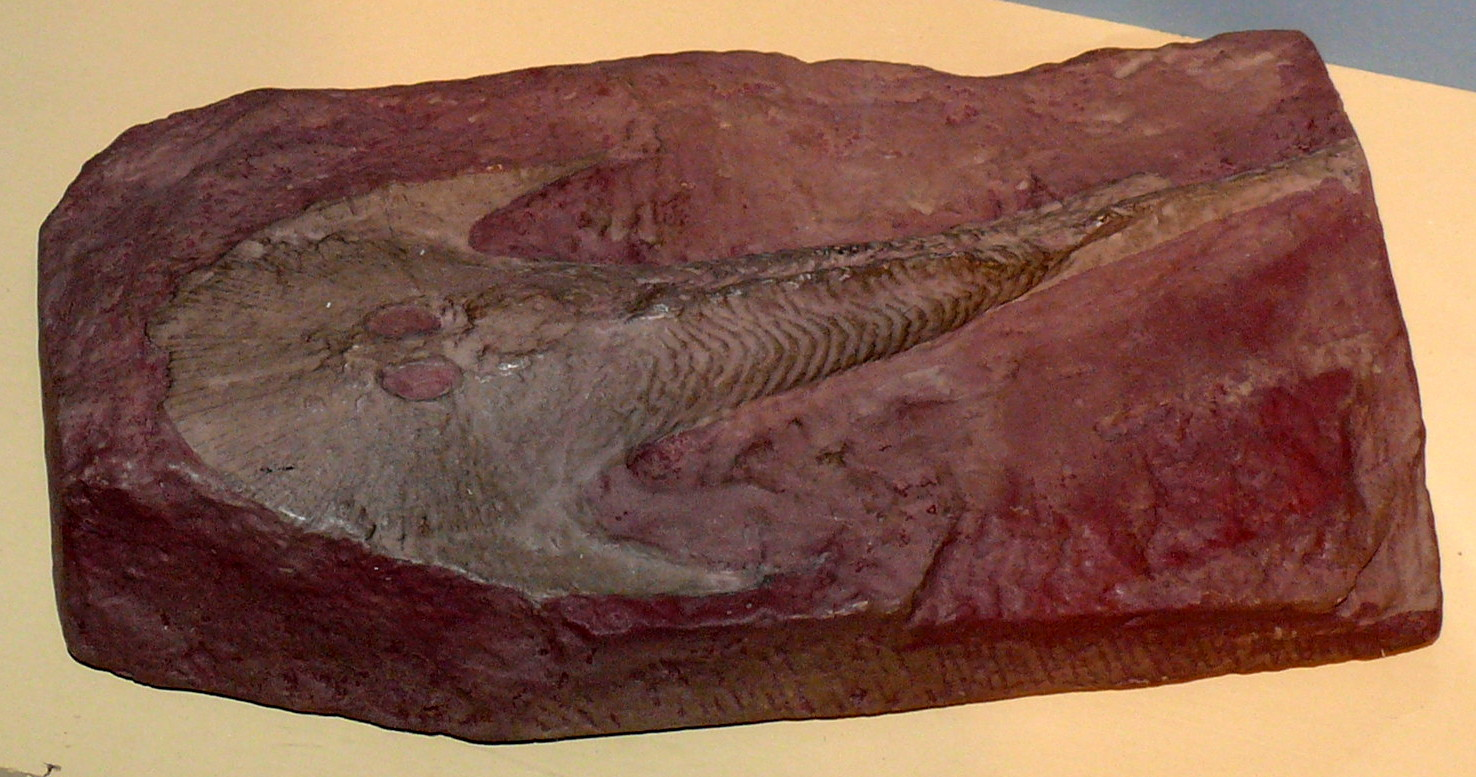
Full body osteostracan specimen attributed to Cephalaspis

Osteostracans (along with possibly Pituriaspida) are the closest known relatives of jawed fish (gnathostomes) among jawless fish, sharing with jawed fish the development of several anatomical characters, including: paired pectoral fins, opercular flaps, sclerotic ossicles, a dermal skeleton with three layers (a basal layer of isopedin, a middle layer of spongy bone, and a superficial layer of dentin), bony (ossified) sclera, and perichondral bone. The osteostracans were more similar to lampreys than to jawed vertebrates in possessing two pairs of semicircular canals in the inner ear, as opposed to the three pairs found in the inner ears of jawed vertebrates.

Most osteostracans had a massive cephalothoracic shield, but all Middle and Late Devonian species appear to have had a reduced, thinner, and often micromeric dermal skeleton. This reduction may have occurred at least three times independently because the pattern of reduction is different in each taxon. The inner endoskeletal headshield was primarily composed of cartilage, which was then lined with a thin outermost layer of bone. This was then in turn covered by a bony exoskeletal headshield. The headshield is most often horseshoe-shaped, though some osteostracans strongly deviated from this, such as many members of Benneviaspidida, whose headshields developed pointed projections. The mouth was located on the underside of the head. Most osteostracans are around 30–40 centimetres (12–16 in) in length, though the smallest were about 4 centimetres (1.6 in), and the largest about 1 metre (3 ft 3 in).

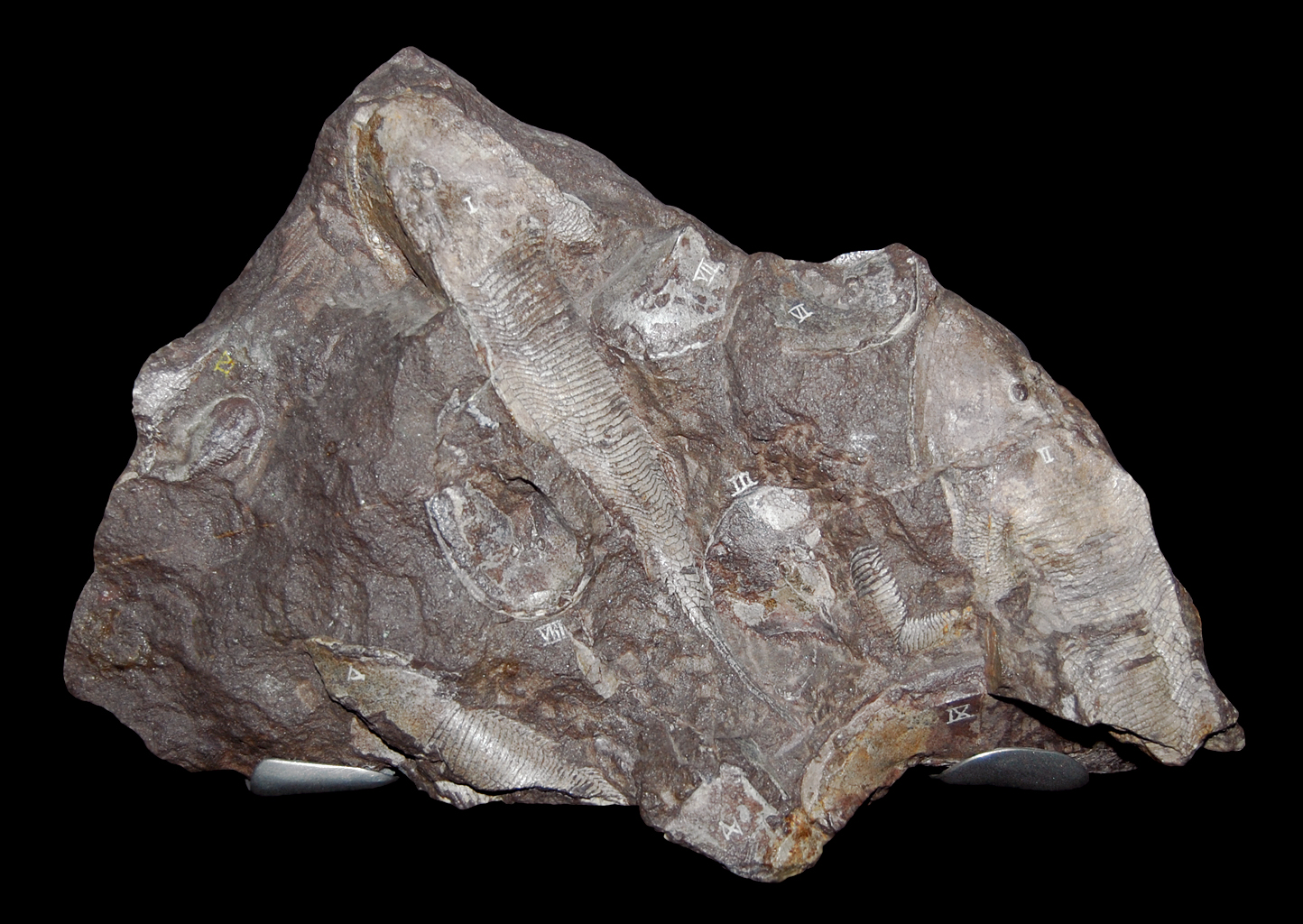
In situ specimens of Hemicyclaspis murchisoni and Thyestes egertoni

They were probably relatively good swimmers, possessing dorsal fins, paired pectoral fins, and a strong tail. The shield of bone covering the head formed a single piece, and so presumably did not grow during adult life. However, the way in which the bone was laid down makes it possible to examine the imprints of nerves and other soft tissues. The eyes are placed closely together on the top of the headshield, with a pineal foramen also being present along with a keyhole-shaped nasohypophysial (olfactory) opening. The upper surface of the headshield of osteostracans are noted for the presence of shallowly depressed areas called "cephalic fields", including an unpaired "median field" located at the midline behind the eyes, and the paired "dorsal fields" running near the outer edge, which are covered in platelets and connected by internal branching canals to the otic capsule of the ear. Their exact function is unknown, but are presumed to be sensory in nature.

The main body of osteostracans is covered in large diamond-shaped scales. There are ancestrally two dorsal fins, later reduced to one or none in later forms. The pair of pectoral fins (which appears to have been lost in some species) had attached musculature. The tail fin was epicercal (the spinal chord extending into the upper lobe). Parts of the body and headshield are covered in line canals of probable sensory function.

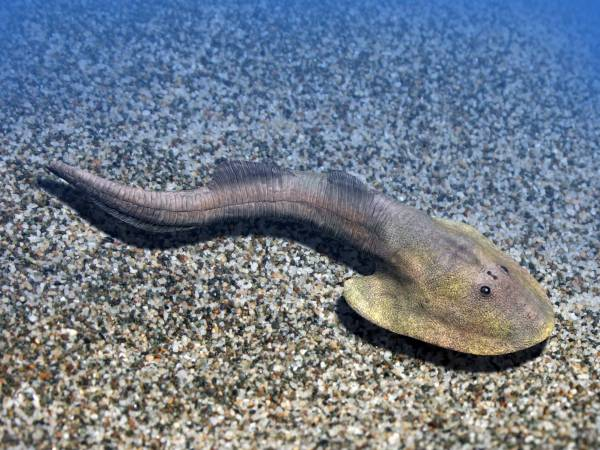
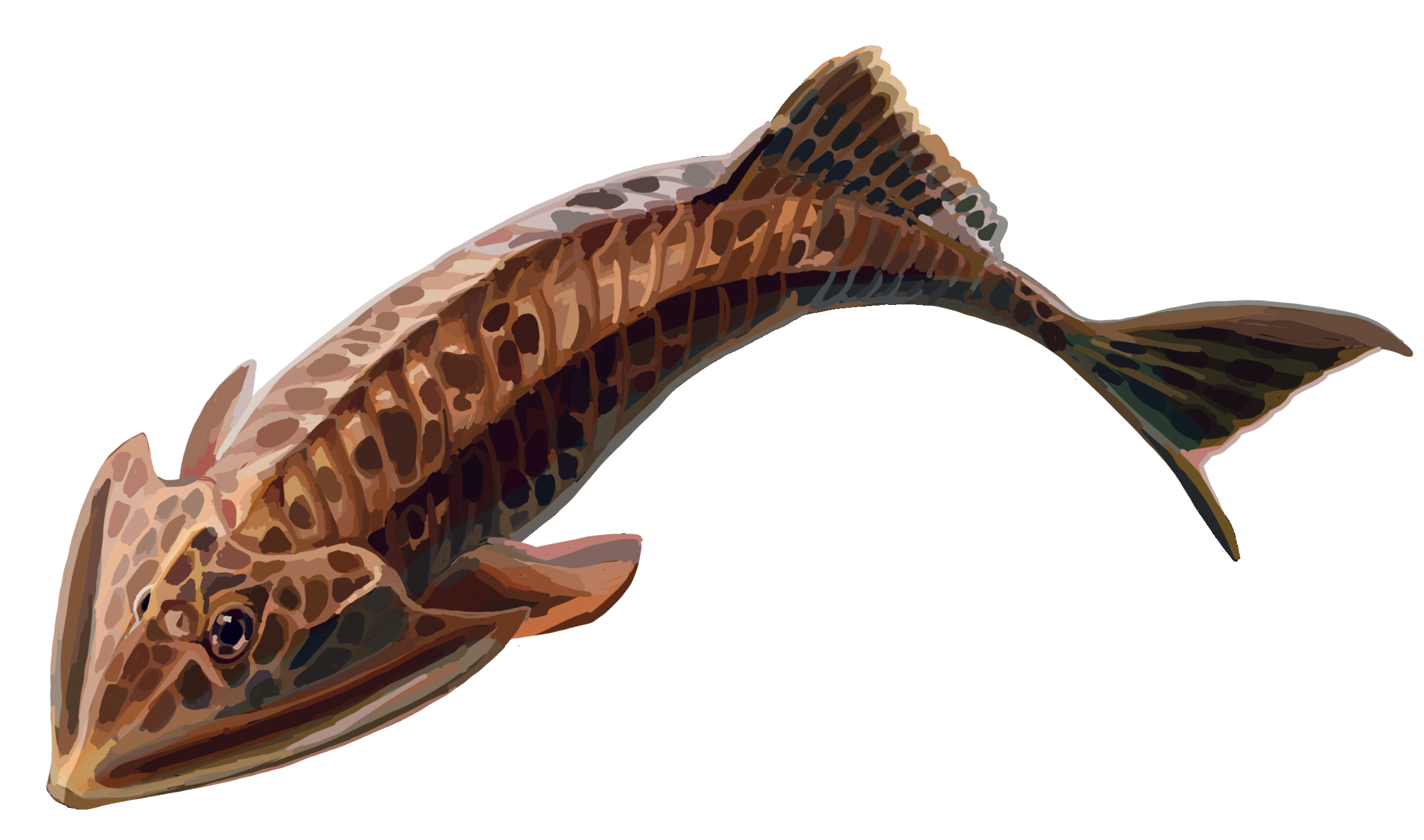
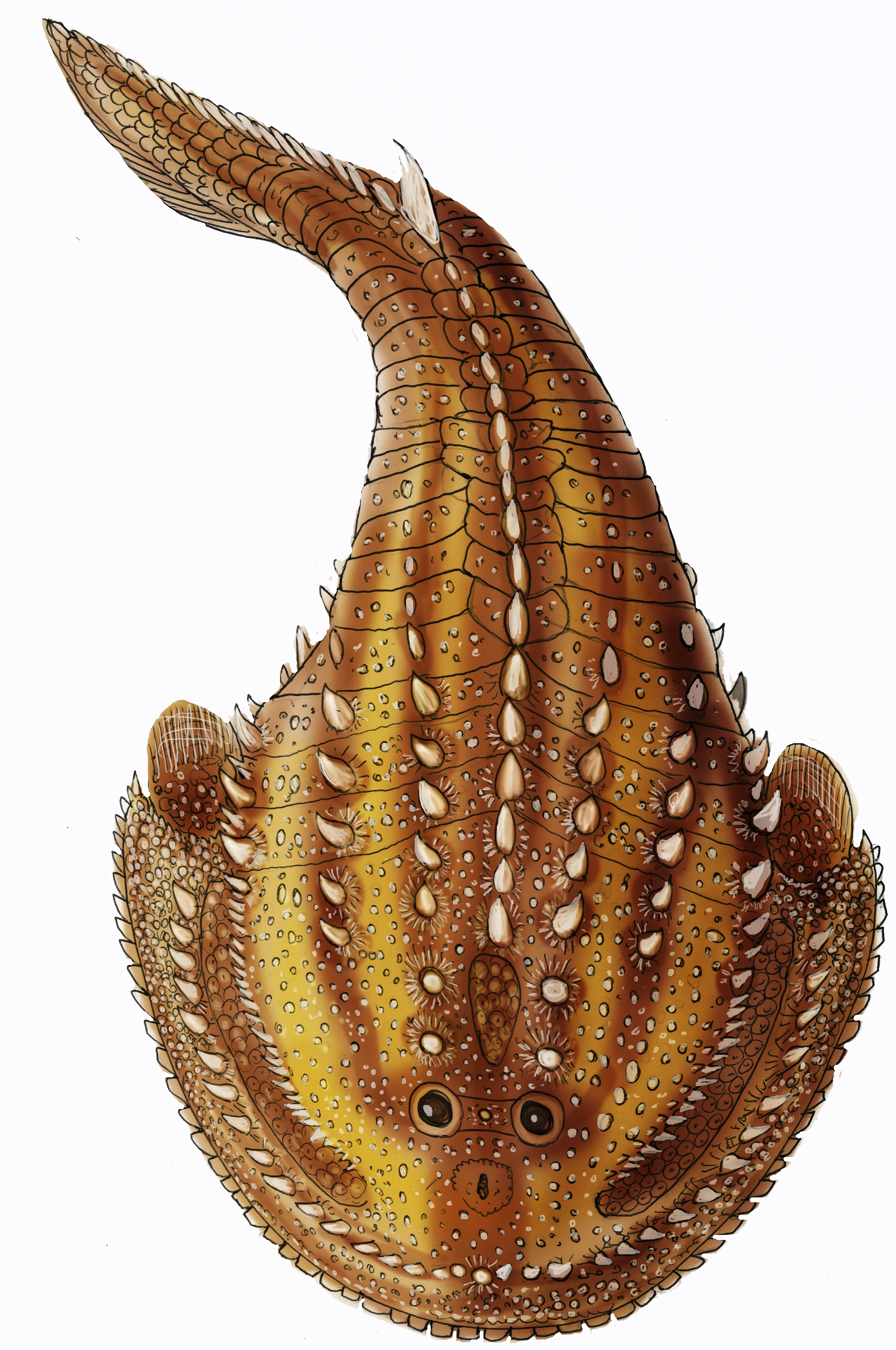
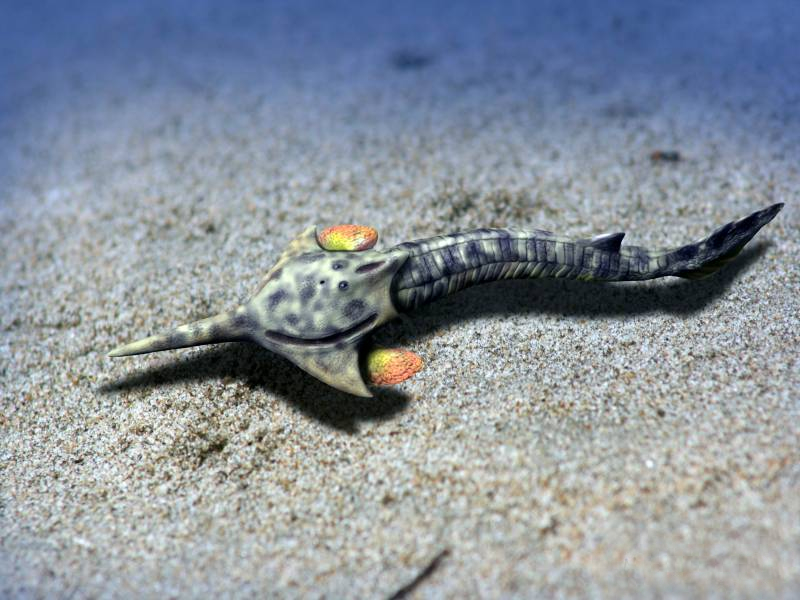
Reconstructions of various osteostracans (from left to right): Ateleaspis (basal non-cornuate in Ateleaspididae), Cephalaspis (basal member of Cornuata, in side view), Wladysagitta (Zenaspida, Cornuata), Thyestes (Thyestiida, Cornuata), and Boreaspis (Benneviaspidida, Cornuata)

== Ecology ==
Osteostracans are generally interpreted as benthic fish that spent much of their time close to the bottom of water bodies, though the diversity of headshield shapes and their hydrodynamic properties suggests that osteostracans varied on how closely they swam to the seafloor, with some exhibiting headshields that were more efficient swimming close to the sediment surface, while others more efficient when swimming in the open water column. Most were inhabitants of shallow marine environments, though some likely lived in freshwater. Osteostracans are suggested to have been deposit feeders, feeding on detritus in sediment. They probably had the ability to sense electric fields (electroreception).

== Evolutionary history ==
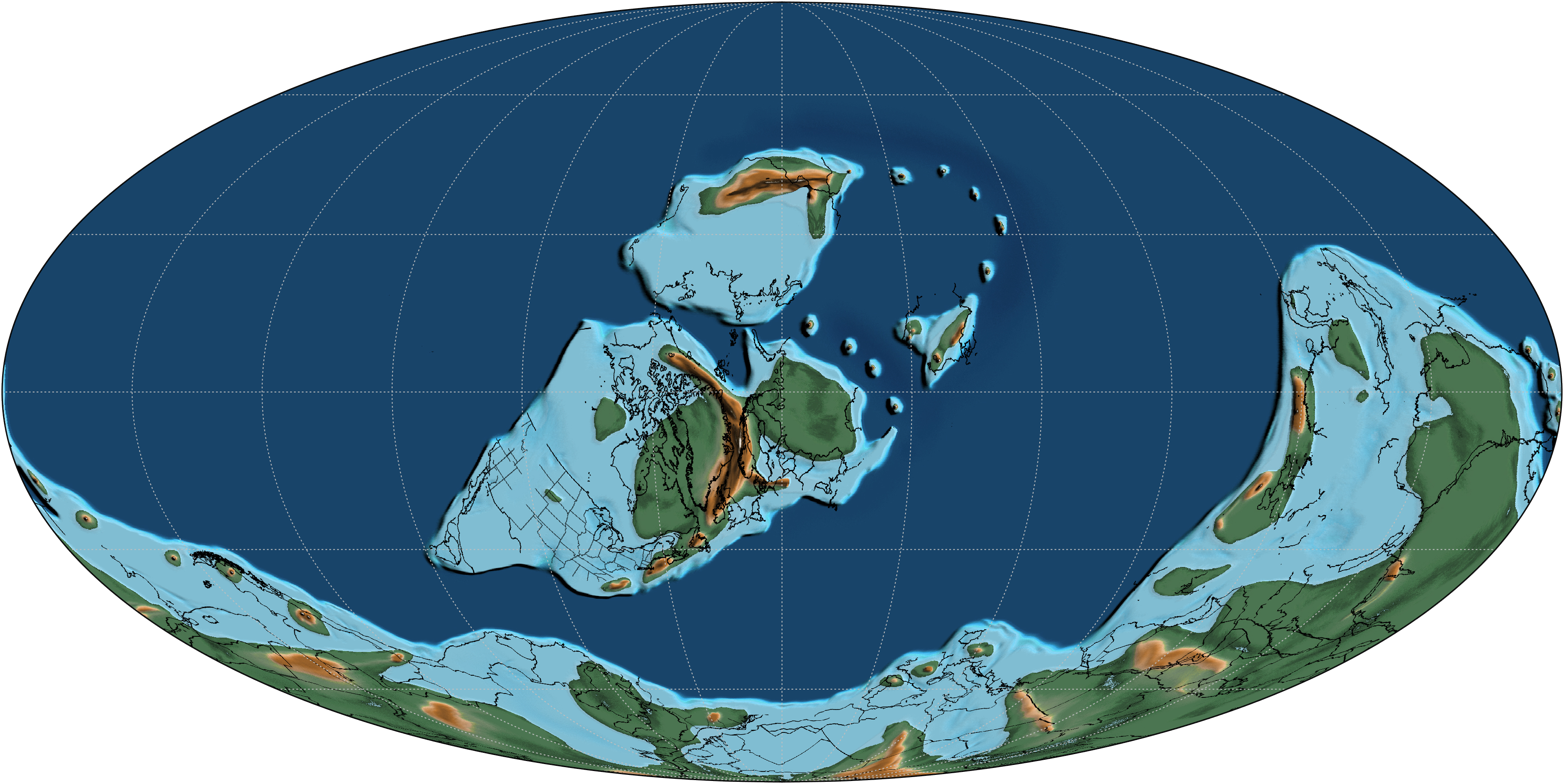
Map of the world during the latest Silurian (Pridoli epoch), showing the landmass of Euramerica (centre), which osteostracans were largely confined to throughout their evolutionary history.

Osteostracans likely originated in central Euramerica/Laurussia, first appearing during the Wenlock stage of the mid-Silurian, though it is estimated they may have originated somewhat earlier, perhaps as early as the late Ordovician. The Zenaspidida subgroup was widely distributed over Euramerica, while Thyestiida was largely confined to Baltica (though with some fossils from Britain and Spitsbergen), while Benneviaspidida is almost entirely confined to Spitsbergen. Osteostracans were largely confined to Euramerica/Laurussia throughout their evolutionary history, never reaching Gondwana, though they did disperse to some isolated terranes that now form part of modern southern Siberia. Osteostracans reached an apex of species and morphological diversity during the Lochkovian and Pragian stages of the Early Devonian, before declining thereafter, becoming extinct by the end of the Frasnian. This time period corresponds with the rise of jawed vertebrates, though the differences in ecology between ostracoderms like osteostracans and jawed vertebrates suggests that direct competition was an unlikely cause of their extinction, with a reduction in suitable habitat as a result of major sea level changes during the period also being proposed cause of the extinction.

== Classification ==
=== Internal phylogeny ===
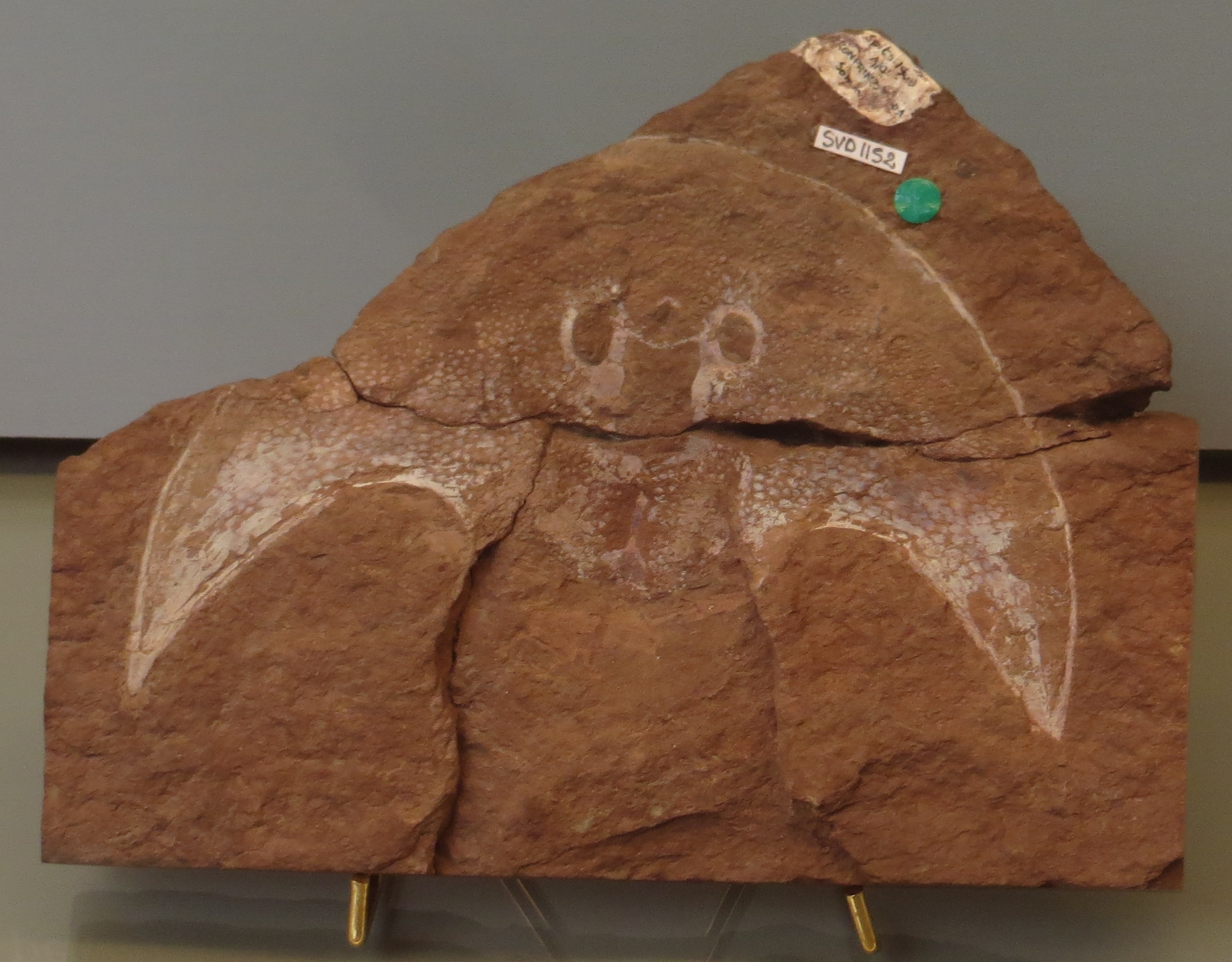
Parameteoraspis (Zenaspidida) fossilized headshield

Below is a cladogram showing the phylogenetic relationships of osteostracans from Sansom (2009) with modifications recovered by Scott & Wilson (2014) and El Fassi El Fehri et al. (2026):

- - Galeaspida
  - - Gnathostomata
    - Osteostraci
      - Ateleaspididae
        - Hirella
        - - Aceraspis
          - Ateleaspis
      - - Hemicyclaspis
        - Cornuata
          - Cephalaspis
          - - - Ymersaspis
              - Saigheadaspis
            - - Zenaspidida
                ⊞
                ⊟
                - Spangenhelmaspis
                - - Platyrhakis
                  - Parameteoraspididae
                    - Parameteoraspis
                    - - Balticaspis
                      - Trewinia
                      - - Escuminaspis
                        - Levesquaspis
                - - Scolenaspis
                  - Ukrainaspis
                  - - Machairaspis
                    - Superciliaspididae
                      - Glabrapelta
                      - - Superciliaspis
                        - Dentapelta
                  - Zenaspididae
                    - Tegaspis
                    - - Stensiopelta
                      - - Diademaspis
                        - Zenaspis
              - - Thyestiida
                  ⊞
                  ⊟
                  - Ilemoraspis
                  - - Procephalaspis
                    - - Auchenaspis
                      - - Thyestes
                        - - Witaaspis
                          - - Tremataspidoidea
                              - Saaremaspis
                              - Tyriaspis
                              - - Aestiaspis
                                - Dartmuthia
                                - - Timanaspis
                                  - - - Oeselaspis
                                      - Tremataspis
                                    - - Dobraspis
                                      - - Sclerodus
                                        - Tannuaspis
                            - Kiaeraspidoidea
                              - Didymaspis
                              - - Kiaeraspis
                                - Norselaspis
                                - - Nectaspis
                                  - - Axinaspis
                                    - - Acrotomaspis
                                      - Gustavaspis
                - - - - Hildenaspis
                      - Mimetaspis
                    - - Zychaspis
                      - - Pattenaspis
                        - Rochtarge
                  - - - Waengsjoeaspis
                      - - Camptaspis
                        - Yvonaspis
                    - Benneviaspidida
                      ⊞
                      ⊟
                      - Ectinaspis
                      - - Securiaspis
                        - - "Benneviaspis" longicornis
                          - - - "Benneviaspis" anglica
                              - - "Benneviaspis" lankesteri
                                - Benneviaspis
                            - Boreaspidoidei
                              - Hoelaspis
                              - Severaspis
                              - - "Boreaspis" ceratops
                                - "Boreaspis" intermedia
                                - Boreaspis
                                - Dicranaspis
                                - - Spatulaspis
                                  - - Belonaspis
                                    - - Hapilaspis
                                      - Tauraspis

=== Taxonomy ===
Cephalaspis was the first osteostracan (as well as the first "ostracoderm" generally) to be scientifically described, by Louis Agassiz in 1835, based on remains found in Britain. He originally compared Cephalaspis to sturgeons and catfish, but later by 1844 noted fundamental anatomical differences. The class Osteostraci was erected by Ray Lankester in 1870. For a long time after its description, Cephalaspis was used as a wastebasket taxon for osteostracans sharing generic anatomical features common to many members of the class. Subsequent classification work has resulted in many former Cephalaspis species placed into new genera by later researchers.

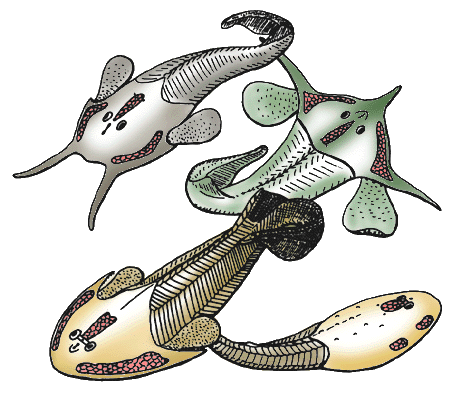
The osteostracans reconstructed here belong to the major clade Cornuata, whose generalised morphology is exemplified by the zenaspidid Zenaspis (bottom left). Some highly derived head-shield morphologies are exemplified by the benneviaspidids Hoelaspis (top right) and Tauraspis (top left), or the thyestiid Tremataspis (bottom right). The latter has lost the paired fins, possibly as a consequence of an adaptation to burrowing habits.

Taxonomic organization after the results of the phylogenetic analysis by Sansom (2009), with additional taxa from El Fassi El Fehri et al. (2026):

- Family Ateleaspididae Traquair, 1899
  - Genus Hirella
  - Subfamily Ateleaspidinae Traquair, 1899
    - Genus Aceraspis
    - Genus Ateleaspis
- Genus Hemicyclaspis
- Genus Kalanaspis

Subclass Cornuata Janvier, 1981a

- Genus Cephalaspis Agassiz, 1835
- Genus Hildenaspis
- Genus Janaspis
- Genus Mimetaspis
- Genus Pattenaspis
- Genus Rochtarge El Fassi El Fehri et al., 2026
- Genus Saigheadaspis El Fassi El Fehri et al., 2026
- Genus Ymersaspis El Fassi El Fehri et al., 2026
- Genus Zychaspis
- Unnamed group
  - Genus Waengsjoeaspis
  - Genus Yvonaspis
  - Genus Camptaspis
- Order Zenaspidida Stensiö, 1958
  - Genus Platyrhakis El Fassi El Fehri et al., 2026
  - Genus Spangenhelmaspis
  - Genus Wladysagitta
  - Family Parameteoraspididae
    - Genus Parameteoraspis
    - Subfamily Escuminaspidinae Arsenault & Janvier 1995
      - Genus Balticaspis
      - Genus Trewinia
      - Genus Escuminaspis
      - Genus Levesquaspis
  - Family Superciliaspididae
    - Genus Glabrapelta
    - Genus Superciliaspis
    - Genus Dentapelta
  - Family Zenaspididae Stensiö, 1958
    - Genus Tegaspis
    - Genus Stensiopelta
    - Genus Zenaspis
    - Genus Diademaspis
  - Family Scolenaspididae
    - Genus Ukrainaspis
    - Genus Scolenaspis
    - Genus Machairaspis
- Order Thyestiida Berg, 1940
  - Genus Ilemoraspis
  - Genus Procephalaspis
  - Genus Auchenaspis
  - Genus Thyestes
  - Genus Witaaspis
  - Superfamily Kiaeraspidoidea Afanassieva, 1991
    - Genus Didymaspis
    - Family Kiaeraspididae Stensiö, 1932
      - Genus Kiaeraspis
      - Genus Norselaspis
      - Genus Nectaspis
      - Genus Axinaspis
      - Subfamily Acrotomaspidinae Janvier, 1981a
        - Genus Acrotomaspis
        - Genus Gustavaspis
  - Superfamily Tremataspidoidea Afanassieva, 1991
    - Genus Dartmuthia
    - Genus Aestiaspis
    - Genus Saaremaaspis
    - Genus Tyriaspis
    - Family Tremataspididae Woodward, 1891
      - Genus Timanaspis
      - Subfamily Tremataspidinae Woodward, 1891
        - Genus Tremataspis
        - Genus Oeselaspis
      - Unnamed subfamily
        - Genus Dobraspis
        - Genus Tannuaspis
        - Genus Sclerodus
- Order Benneviaspidida Janvier, 1996
  - Genus Ectinaspis
  - Genus Securiaspis
  - Genus Benneviaspis
  - Superfamily Boreaspidoidei Stensiö, 1958
    - Genus Hoelaspis
    - Genus Severaspis
    - Family Boreaspididae Stensiö, 1958
      - Genus Boreaspis
      - Genus Dicranaspis
      - Genus Spatulaspis
      - Genus Belonaspis
      - Genus Tauraspis

=== External phylogeny ===
Phylogeny of jawless fish after Reeves and colleagues 2023

- Vertebrata total group
  - †Haikouella
  - - †Metaspriggina
    - †Myllokunmingiida
    - Vertebrata crown group
      - Cyclostomi total group
        - †Anaspida
          - †Birkeniida
          - - †Lasanius
            - - †Jamoytius
              - †Euphanerops
        - - †Euconodonta
          - Cyclostomi crown group
            - Myxinoidea
            - Petromyzontida
      - Gnathostomata total group
        - †Pteraspidomorphi
          - †Astraspis
          - - †Arandaspida
            - †Heterostraci
        - - †Thelodonti
            - †Furcacaudiformes
            - †Thelodontiformes
          - - †Pituriaspida
            - - †Galeaspida
              - - †Osteostraci
                - Gnathostomata (traditional usage)
                  - †Antiarchi
                  - - †Arthrodira
                    - Gnathostomata crown group
                      - Osteichthyes
                      - Chondrichthyes
