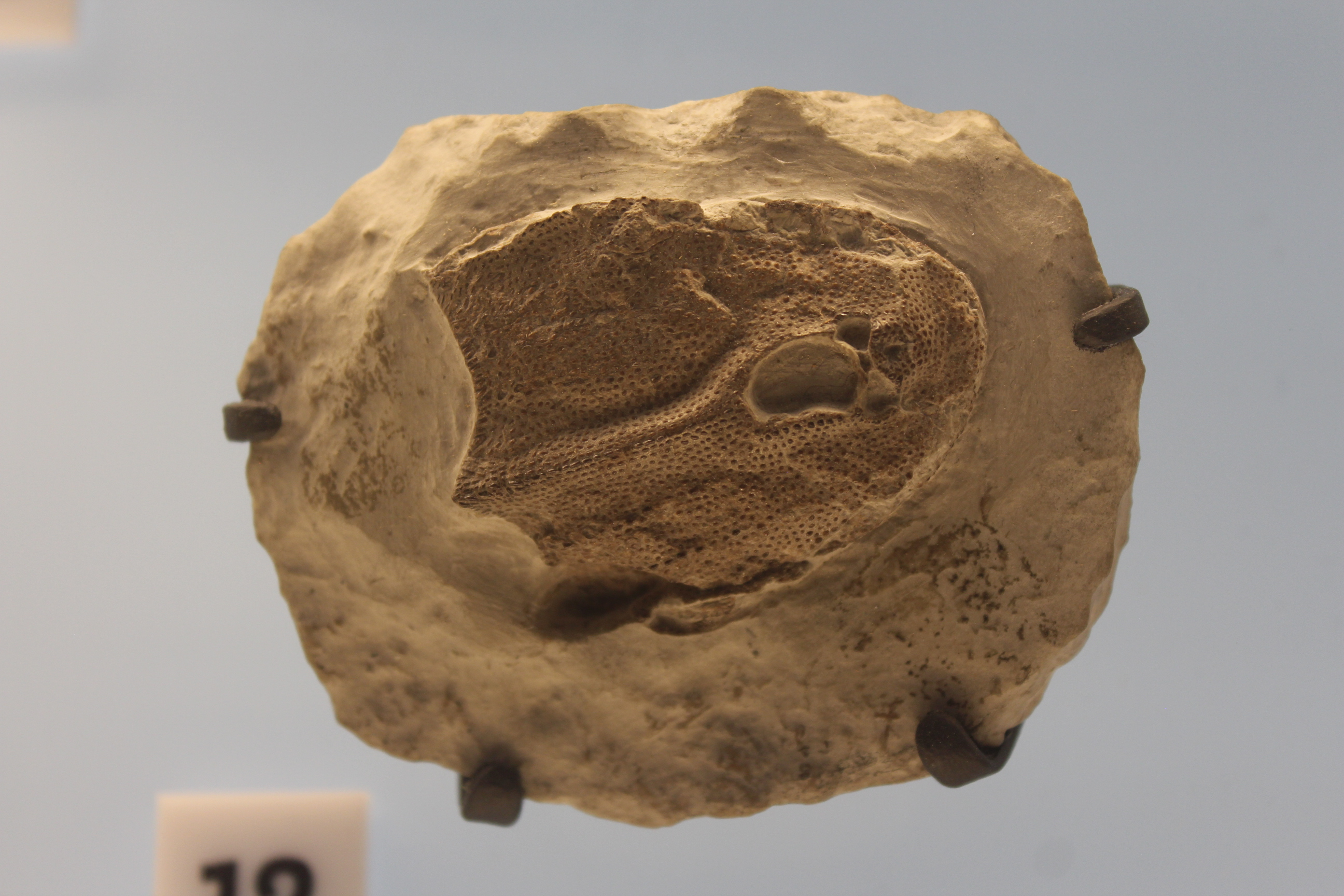
- Head shield of Dartmuthia gemmifera (USNM 21347)

Scientific classification
- Kingdom: Animalia
- Phylum: Chordata
- Infraphylum: Agnatha
- Class: †Osteostraci
- Order: †Thyestiida
- Family: †Tremataspidae
- Genus: †Dartmuthia; Patten, 1931

Type species
- †Dartmuthia gemmifera Patten, 1931

Species
- †D. gemmifera Patten, 1931; †D. procera Marss et al., 2014

= Dartmuthia =

Dartmuthia Temporal range: Ludlow, 427–423 Ma

Extinct genus of jawless fishes

Dartmuthia is an extinct genus of primitive jawless fish that lived in the Silurian period. Fossils of Dartmuthia have been found in Himmiste Quarry, on the island of Saaremaa in Estonia. It was first described by William Patten.

Dartmuthia is one of the only osteostracans in which material of the trunk and tail behind the armored head shield have been found. Since the mouth is positioned on the underside of the head Dartmuthia is presumed to have dwelled on the ocean floor, sucking its food into its mouth.
