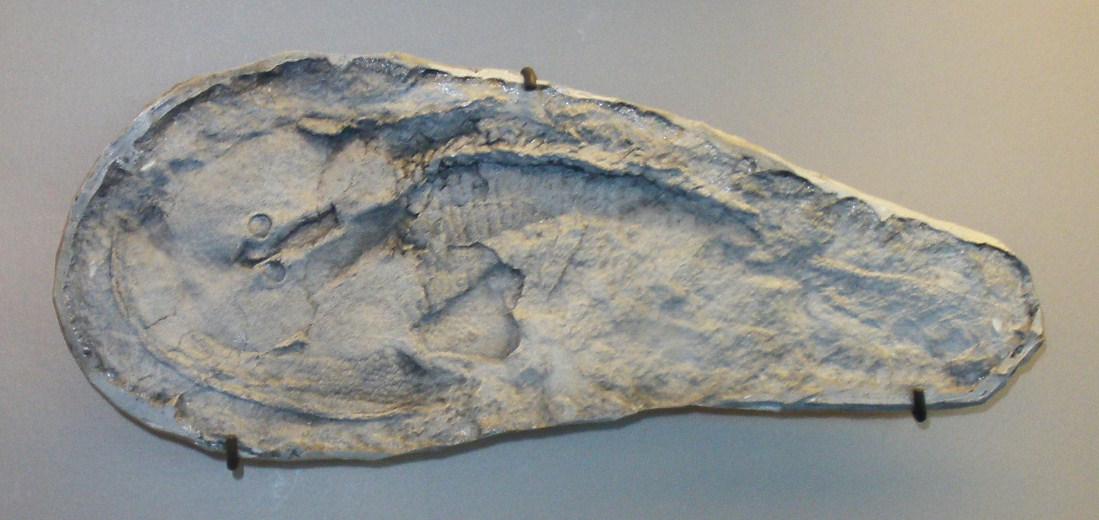
- Fossil of Zenaspis powriei

Scientific classification
- Kingdom: Animalia
- Phylum: Chordata
- Infraphylum: Agnatha
- Class: †Osteostraci
- Order: †Zenaspidida
- Family: †Zenaspididae
- Genus: †Zenaspis; Lankester, 1869

Type species
- Zenaspis salweyi

Species
- Zenaspis pagei; Zenaspis podolica; Zenaspis powriei; Zenaspis salweyi; Zenaspis waynensis

= Zenaspis =

Zenaspis Temporal range: Early Devonian

Extinct genus of jawless fishes

Zenaspis is an extinct genus of osteostracan jawless fish which existed during the early Devonian period. Due to it being jawless, Zenaspis was probably a bottom feeder. Zenaspis was around 10 inches (25 cm) in length. It had a horseshoe shaped head that probably sheltered a small brain.

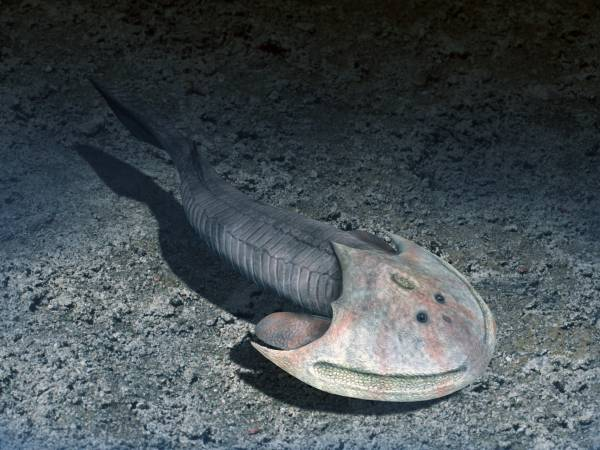
Life reconstruction of Zenaspis pagei
