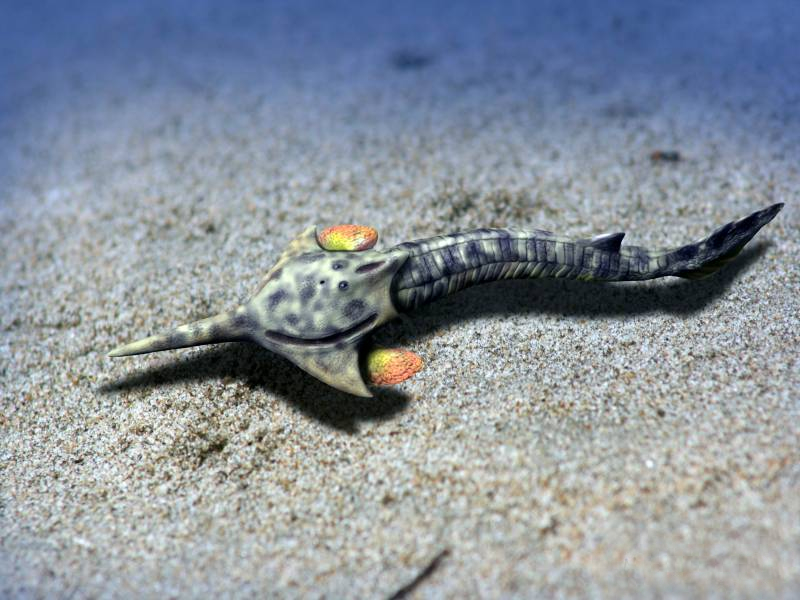
- Life restoration of Boreaspis

Scientific classification
- Kingdom: Animalia
- Phylum: Chordata
- Infraphylum: Agnatha
- Class: †Osteostraci
- Order: †Benneviaspidida

Subgroups
- †Benneviaspis; †Ectinaspis; †Securiaspis; †Boreaspidoidea; †Hoelaspis; †Severaspis; †Boreaspididae; †Belonaspis; †Boreaspis; †Spatulaspis; †Tauraspis

= Benneviaspidida =

Benneviaspidida Temporal range: 416–398 Ma Early Devonian

Order of fossil fishes

Benneviaspidida is an order of osteostracan jawless fishes which lived in the Early Devonian. The fishes in this order have a flat headshield and are dorsoventrally depressed. The first canal to lateral sensory field bifurcates near the orbit.

== Phylogeny ==
The cladogram below is adapted from Sansom (2009):

- Benneviaspidida
  - Ectinaspis
  - - Securiaspis
    - - "Benneviaspis" longicornis
      - - - "Benneviaspis" anglica
          - - "Benneviaspis" lankasteri
            - Benneviaspis
        - Boreaspidoidea
          - Hoelaspis
          - Severaspis
          - - "Boreaspis" ceratops
            - "Boreaspis" intermedia
            - Boreaspis
            - Depranaspis
            - - Spatulaspis
              - - Belonaspis
                - - Hapilaspis
                  - Tauraspis
