= Witaaspis =

Witaaspis Temporal range: Silurian

Scientific classification
- Kingdom: Animalia
- Phylum: Chordata
- Class: Osteostraci
- Family: †Cephalaspidae
- Genus: Witaaspis
- Species: W. patteni

Genus of jawless fishes

Witaaspis was an extinct genus of osteostraci fish that lived in the Wenlock and Ludlow epochs of the Silurian period.

Witaaspis schrenckii (Pander) and Witaaspis patteni Robertson were formally named in 1945, along with three other genara of osteostraci.

The genera were named Witaaspis after the quarry in Estonia where the specimens were found.
