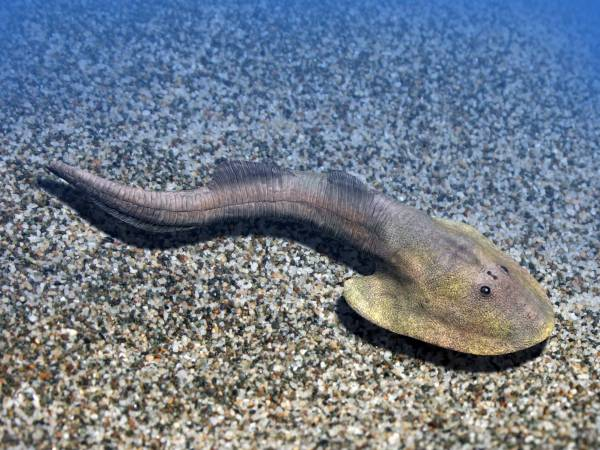
- Ateleaspis tessellata

Scientific classification
- Kingdom: Animalia
- Phylum: Chordata
- Infraphylum: Agnatha
- Class: †Osteostraci
- Order: †Atelaspidiformes
- Family: †Ateleaspididae; Traquair, 1899

Genera
- †Aceraspis; †Ateleaspis; †Hirella; †Kalanaspis

= Ateleaspididae =

Family of jawless fishes

Ateleaspididae is a prehistoric jawless fish family in the class Osteostraci.
