= Procephalaspis =

Procephalaspis Temporal range: Silurian

Scientific classification
- Kingdom: Animalia
- Phylum: Chordata
- Infraphylum: Agnatha
- Class: †Osteostraci
- Order: †Thyestiida
- Genus: †Procephalaspis

Extinct genus of jawless fishes

Procephalaspis is an extinct genus of jawless fish.
