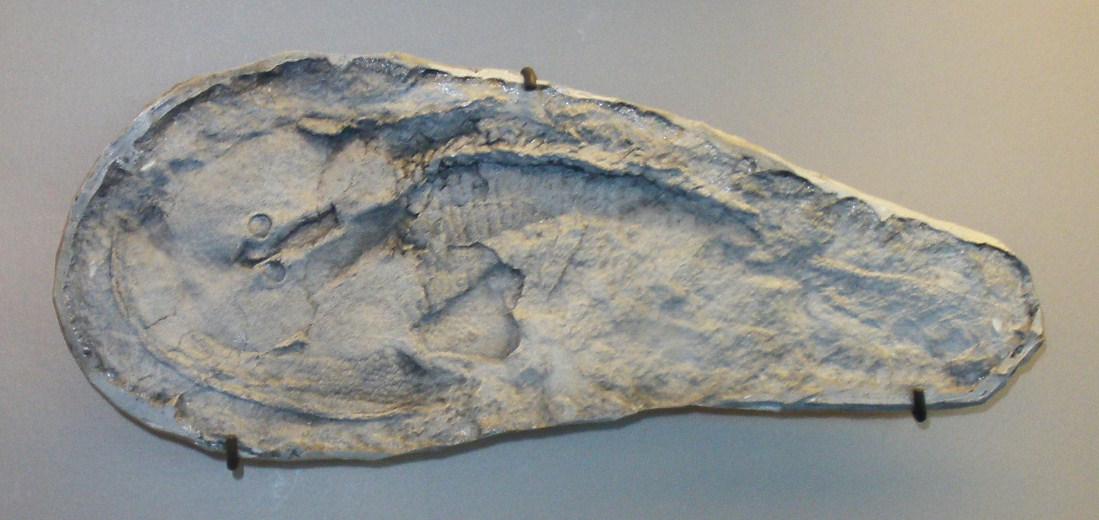
- Fossil of Zenaspis powriei

Scientific classification
- Kingdom: Animalia
- Phylum: Chordata
- Infraphylum: Agnatha
- Class: †Osteostraci
- Subclass: †Cornuata
- Order: †Zenaspidida; Stensiö, 1958

Subgroups
- †Platyrhakis; †Spangenhelmaspis; †Wladysagitta; †Parameteoraspididae; †Superciliaspididae; †Scolenaspididae; †Zenaspididae

Synonyms
- Zenaspida

= Zenaspidida =

Extinct order of jawless vertebrates

Zenaspidida is an extinct order of osteostracans, a group of jawless stem-gnathostomes. They possessed a distinct headshield, which varied in width to length ratio by species.

== Description ==
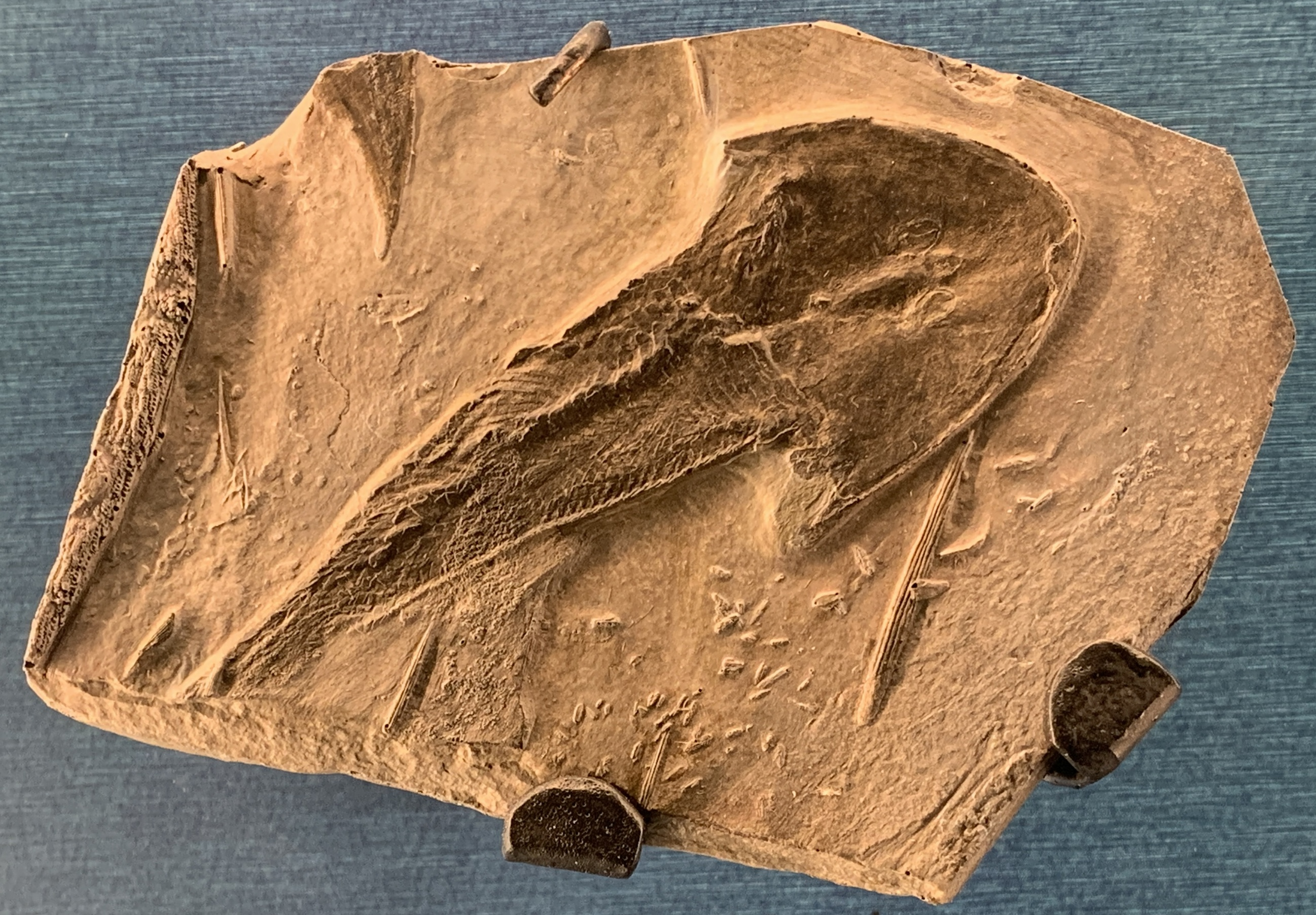
Cast of the zenaspidid Diademaspis mackenziensis. Early Devonian, Mackenzie Mountains, Northwest Territories (Canada). At the Royal Tyrrell Museum of Palaeontology.

The head shield is dome-shaped and extremely large in comparison to the main body. The abdominal section of this shield has a less developed median dorsal crest. As a rule for this order, the nasohypophysial opening is larger than the nasal division. The pineal plate seen in other osteostracans is barely developed or completely absent. The median dorsal field is notably broad, and the lateral fields are widened in the posterior, but reach back no further than the proximal section of the dorsal surface of the cornual processes. The ornamentation on the head shield can have singular, large tubercles, or groups of tubercles which range in size. This is often used to speciate.

== Classification ==
The cladogram below is adapted from a 2014 article by Scott and Wilson:

- Zenaspidida
  - Spangenhelmaspis
  - Parameteoraspididae
    - Parameteoraspis
    - - Balticaspis
      - Trewinia
      - - Escuminaspis
        - Levesquaspis
  - - Wladysagitta
    - - Superciliaspididae
        - Glabrapelta
        - - Dentapelta
          - Superciliaspis
      - - Scolenaspididae
          - Machairaspis
          - Scolenaspis
          - Ukrainaspis
        - Zenaspididae
          - Tegaspis
          - - Stensiopelta
            - - Diademaspis
              - Zenaspis
