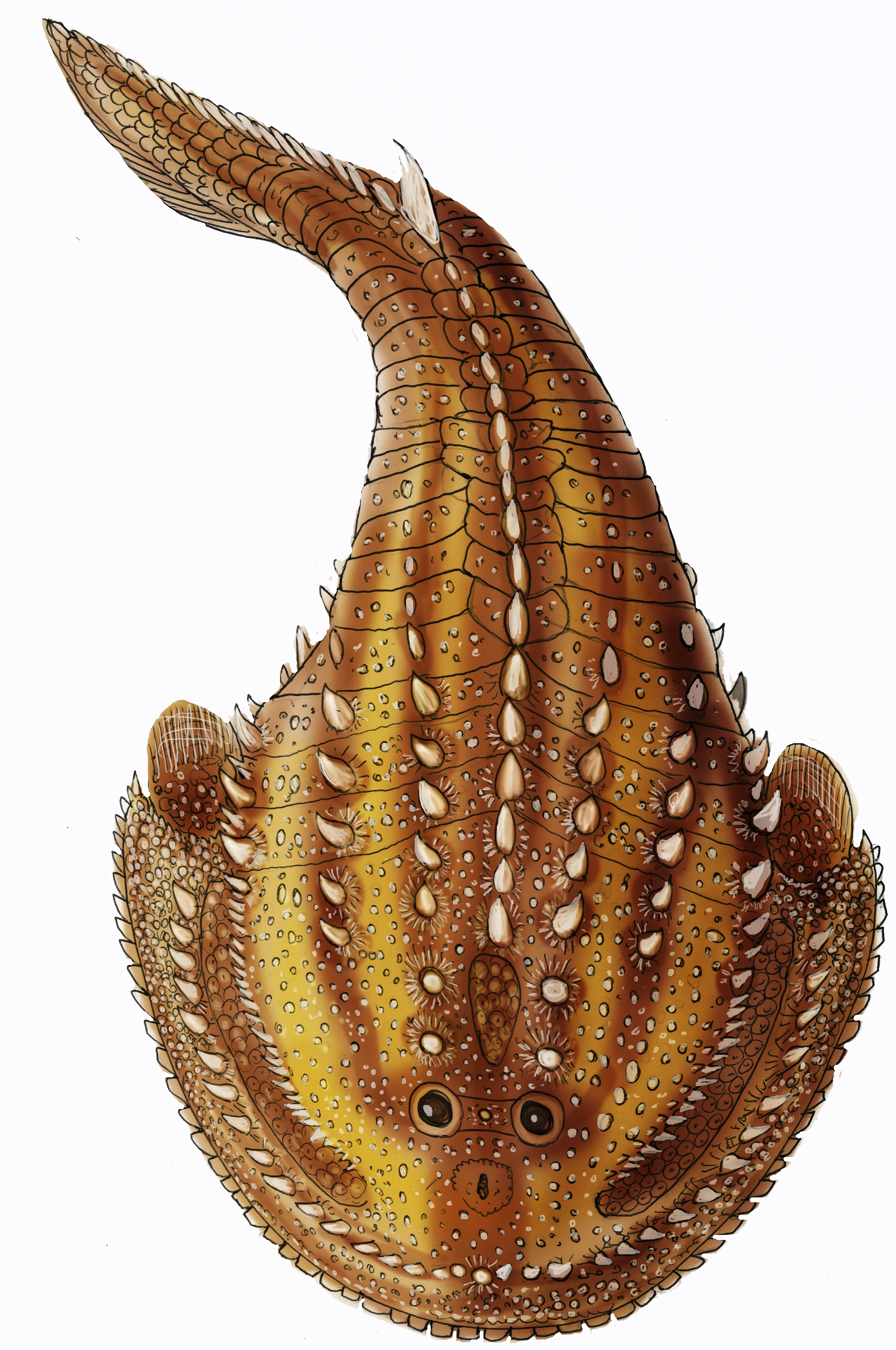

Scientific classification
- Kingdom: Animalia
- Phylum: Chordata
- Infraphylum: Agnatha
- Class: †Osteostraci
- Order: †Thyestiida
- Family: †Thyestiidae
- Genus: †Thyestes

Species
- Thyestes verrucosus

= Thyestes (fish) =

Thyestes Temporal range: Ludlow
- Head shield diagram

Extinct genus of jawless fishes

Thyestes is an extinct genus of osteostracan agnathan vertebrate. It includes the species Thyestes verrucosus, whose fossils are found in Late Silurian (Middle to Late Ludlow-aged) marine strata of Saaremaa island, Estonia. The exoskeleton of Thyestes is covered in numerous tubercles.
