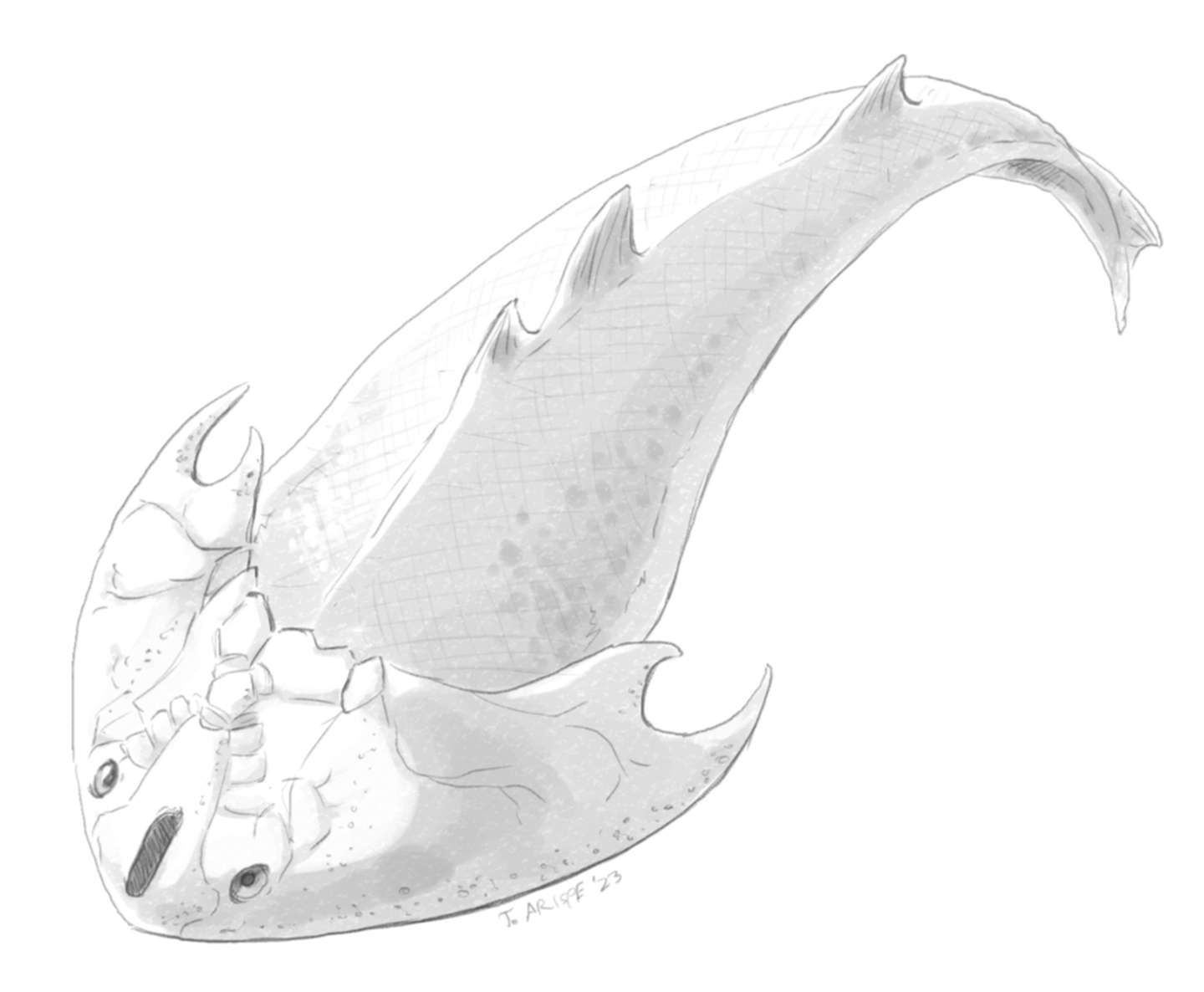

Scientific classification
- Kingdom: Animalia
- Phylum: Chordata
- Infraphylum: Agnatha
- Class: †Galeaspida
- Order: †Eugaleaspidiformes
- Family: †Tujiaaspidae
- Genus: †Tujiaaspis; Gai et al., 2022
- Species: †T. vividus

Binomial name
- †Tujiaaspis vividus Gai et al., 2022

= Tujiaaspis =

Tujiaaspis Temporal range: Telychian, 436 Ma

Genus of Silurian jawless fish

Tujiaaspis is an extinct genus of eugaleaspidiform, a group of armored jawless fish, from the Huixingshao Formation of China. It contains one species, Tujiaaspis vividus, which lived 436 million years ago, during the Telychian age of the Silurian period.

Around 7 cm (2.8 in) in length, Tujiaaspis was protected by a bony headshield covered in a pattern of sensory canals. It also possessed a pair of ventrolateral fins, elongate fins running across the body wall from the gills to the base of the tail, which would have helped it passively generate lift. The first galeaspid known from articulated specimens, Tujiaaspis provided evidence that they possessed ventrolateral fins, which may have been the precursors to paired pectoral and pelvic appendages in gnathostomes. In life, Tujiaaspis was likely an active swimmer, living in a coastal, nutrient-rich environment.

== Discovery and naming ==
Tujiaaspis vividus was described in 2022 from the Huixingshao Formation of China, dated to the middle-late Telychian age of the Silurian, around 436 million years ago. Three nearly complete articulated specimens are known from two localities in Xiushan County, Chongqing Municipality; and Baojing County, Hunan Province. This makes Tujiaaspis the first known galeaspid with extensive body preservation. Tujiaaspis has been characterized as part of the Chongqing Lagerstätte, a highly preserved fossil site within the Huixingshao Formation.

The generic name refers to the Tujia people, an ethnic minority native to the discovery sites, compounded with the term aspis (ἀσπίς) meaning 'shield' in Ancient Greek. The specific epithet vividus means 'lively' in Latin.

== Description ==
Tujiaaspis measured around 7 cm (2.8 in) in length. Its frontal half was covered in a flattened, roughly triangular bony headshield. The headshield bore intricate sensory canals, and terminated in two pairs of protrusions, the cornual and inner cornual processes, respectively positioned laterally and medially. The median dorsal opening at the front of the headshield was elongated lengthwise, reaching up to the middle of the orbits. The trunk was elongate and flattened on the ventral side, measuring around 13 mm (0.51 in) in width and 4 mm (0.16 in) in height at its widest when connecting to the headshield, and compressing laterally towards the tail.

Two triangular unpaired dorsal fins were joined at the base near the headshield, and have been posited to make up a single composite fin. A third more oblique dorsal fin was located near the base of the tail. Scales on all three fins were arranged in a pattern similar to fin rays. The hypocercal tail was roughly symmetrical, in contrast to other galeaspids like Foxaspis. While incompletely preserved, the edge of the tail suggests the presence of at least six rows of striations covered in dermal scales, analogous to fin rays, which may have been linked by a fin web.

Elongated paired fins, termed ventrolateral fins, extended across the body wall from the branchial area to the base of the tail fin's lower lobe. They were supported by V-shaped skeletal units, and covered in a row of parallel scales. Computational fluid dynamics simulations have shown that these fins would have passively generated lift by redirecting the flow of water towards the ventral surface, likened to hydrofoils by the discovering researchers.

== Classification ==
Tujiaaspis was a galeaspid, an extinct group of armored jawless fish. It is classified in the order Eugaleaspidiformes based on synapomorphies such as the longitudinal, oval-like shape of the median dorsal opening and the presence of cornual and inner cornual processes on the posterior sides of the headshield. Its closest relative is believed to be Miaojiaaspis, with which it forms the family Tujiaaspidae, characterized by the patterns of their sensory canals. Tujiaaspis differed from Miaojiaaspis in its triangular headshield shape, the higher level of branching in its sensory canal network, and its more elongate median dorsal opening. A 2024 phylogeny places the family in an unresolved polytomy at the base of Eugaleaspidiformes, alongside Shuyuidae and a larger clade including the "eugaleaspid cluster". This same topology was found in a 2026 study.

Strict consensus phylogeny according to Chen et al., 2024 and Zhang et al., 2026:

- Eugaleaspidiformes
  - Tujiaaspidae
    - Tujiaaspis
    - Miaojiaaspis
  - Shuyuidae
    - Meishanaspis
    - Shuyu
    - - Qiangshuiaspis
      - Jiangxialepis
  - - Anjiaspis
    - - Sinogaleaspidae
      - - Yongdongaspis
        - "Eugaleaspid cluster"

=== Fin evolution ===
The ventrolateral fins in Tujiaaspis have been compared to similar ridge-like structures in anaspids, thelodonts, and osteostracans, the latter of which bear differentiated pectoral fins. Discoverers of Tujiaaspis posited that the ventrolateral fins in galeaspids and osteostracans were homologous, and that they were ancestral to both sets of paired appendages in gnathostomes. According to this hypothesis, the pectoral fins would have emerged first by the specialization of the anterior part of the fin fold, as evidenced in osteostracans. Later, in gnathostomes, the remaining ventrolateral fins would have become restricted to the pelvic area, leading to the pelvic fins. Both pairs of fins would later evolve articulation as their role shifted from passive lift generation to active propulsion. This prediction has been described as "a new twist" on the fin-fold hypothesis, which posits that pectoral and pelvic fins evolved from the division of the ventrolateral fins into several domains of competence, although Gai et al. state that their new hypothesis differs from the fin-fold hypothesis in that it does not predict a simultaneous emergence of the pectoral and pelvic fins, and posits that the regionalization of fins arose from pre-existing regulatory domains.

Ventrolateral fins are also known in Miaojiaaspis and inferred from scale patterns in the more basal Xihaiaspis, suggesting they would have been ancestral to galeaspids as a whole.

== Paleoecology ==
A 2023 analysis by Gai et al. of Tujiaaspis and Foxaspis found that galeaspids would have been relatively fast, active swimmers, countering earlier hypotheses that the development of a heterocercal tail was necessary for this lifestyle.

The Huixingshao Formation preserves a middle to late Telychian coastal environment with inflows of freshwater, on the shelf basin of the Yangtze Sea, a marginal sea of the Qinling Ocean, as it transitioned away from an anoxic environment. Chemical weathering would have led to a nutrient-rich environment, increasing biological productivity during the deposition of the Chongqing Lagerstätte. Alongside Tujiaaspis, the Lagerstätte preserves its relative Miaojiaaspis, and the more derived eugaleaspiform Yongdongaspis. Another galeaspid specimen, provisionally termed IVPP 26669, is known from the same locality as the Tujiaaspis holotype. Other known vertebrates from that formation include the placoderm Xiushanosteus and the cartilaginous fish Shenacanthus, which shared the environment with sea scorpions such as Hunanopterus (previously considered as a species of Hughmilleria) and various phyllocarid crustaceans.
