= Asioaspis =

Asioaspis Temporal range: Lower Lochkovian, 419.6–416.3 Ma

Scientific classification
- Kingdom: Animalia
- Phylum: Chordata
- Infraphylum: Agnatha
- Class: †Galeaspida
- Order: †Polybranchiaspiformes
- Family: †Asioaspidae; Zhang et al., 2026
- Genus: †Asioaspis; Zhang et al., 2026

Type species
- †Asioaspis brachyotus Zhang et al., 2026

Extinct genus of jawless fish

Asioaspis is an extinct genus of polybranchiaspiform galeaspid jawless fish from Yunnan, China and is the only genus in the monotypic family Asioaspidae. Its fossils are only known from the Xishancun Formation, the fossils dating back to the Early Devonian. One of the most notable features of the fish is the presence of a pair of projecting cornual processes that extend laterally away from the headshield. Asioaspis has a mosaic of features that place it as one of the most basal Polybranchiaspiformes, with it being between the early family Gumuaspidae and all other members of the order. Though it has the wide head shield closer to what is seen in the most basal members of the order, features of the shield suggest that the fish would have had an epibenthic lifestyle more like later members. Only one species is assigned to the genus: A. brachyotus.

== History and naming ==
The material assigned to Asioaspis was discovered in a large pile of dark grey siltstone originating from the Xishancun Formation located in the Triathlon Sports Park in Qujing City, Yunnan Province, China. This pile was the result of the construction of a tunnel through the Liaokuo Hill. This locality was discovered during ongoing field work in the region, with authors publishing on material from the site since 2021. The material itself was described in 2026 by RuiRui Zhang and coauthors with the authors describing a total of seven complete head shields. This publication not only named the new genus, but also coined the family Asioaspidae due to features of the rim of the headshield.

The generic name Asioaspis is a combination of the owl genus Asio in reference to the similar ear-like tuffs along with the Greek word for shield, "aspis". The specific name "brachyotus" also refers to the ear-like projections of the animal with this translating to "short-eared" in Greek.

== Description ==
Like all galeaspids, Asioaspis is not a large fish with it having a headshield with a length of 59.9 millimetres (2.36 in) and width of 52.3 millimetres (2.06 in) which makes the width to height ration 1/1. Unlike some other members of the group, the fish did not have any long rostral processes or dorsal projections, though the posterior portion of the headshield is very concave. The median dorsal opening is circular and is close to the front edge of the shield, the back of this opening is roughly parallel with the front of the orbital openings. These openings are ovoid and of average size, being placed at the top of the shield. They are very far apart from one another, placing them far away from the midline of the shield. Towards back of the headshield is largely made up of a dome-shaped oralobranchial chamber surrounded by very large ventral rims, causing this region to be very wide. The posterior-most region of the shield of Asioaspis is one of the most notable features of the shield due to the presence of a pair of large, broad inner cornual processes that project towards the midline along with a pair of cornual processes that project outwards laterally. These cornual processes specifically are what the genus is named after. The headshield as a whole is well ornamented with the edges of the shield being serrated. These tubercules decrease in size posteriorly, ranging from 0.2–0.3 millimetres (0.0079–0.0118 in) in diameter but are the largest on the inner cornual processes.

The sensory canal system of Asioaspis is similar to other members of Polybranchiaspiformes. The posterior supraorbital canals start at the back of the orbital openings and move towards the midline, almost forming a v-shape. Close to these are the infraorbital canals which start next to the orbital openings and end by merging with the lateral dorsal canals. There are then four pairs of lateral transverse canals which start at the lateral dorsal canals. These very in length with the second being the shortest, the third being the longest, and the first and fourth being the same size. The final part of the sensory canal system, the dorsal commissure, connects the bilateral lateral dorsal canals near where the second pair of lateral transverse canals are positioned.

== Classification ==
Due to a number of features such as the more ovoid headshield and features of the sensory canal system, Asioaspis is a member of the order Polybranchiaspiformes. In the 2026 description by RuiRui Zhang and coauthors, it is suggested that the genus is one of the more basal members of the order: being placed between the most basal family Gumuaspidae and all other members of the order. Due to the projecting cornual processes seen in the genus, a number of comparisons are also made to another family, Dayongaspidae. However, the cornual processes seen in this other family are much larger than what is seen in Asioaspis. Below is the phylogenic tree from the description paper based on a matrix from a previous 2025 by Zhang and coauthors showing the more basal position of the genus.

- Polybranchiaspidida
  - Geraspidae
    ⊞
    ⊟
    - Geraspis
    - Kwangnanaspis
  - - Polybranchiaspiformes
      - Gumuaspidae
        - Gumuaspis
        - - Platylomaspis
          - Nanningaspis
      - - Asioaspidae
          - Asioaspis
        - - Pentathyraspidae
            - Pentathyraspis
            - Microhoplonaspis
          - - Duyunolepidae
              - Lopadaspis
              - Foxaspis
              - Duyunolepis
            - Polybranchiaspidae
              - Dongfangaspis
              - Bannhuanaspis
              - - Polybranchiaspis
                - Altigibbaspis
                - - Laxaspis
                  - - Damaspis
                    - Cyclodiscaspis
    - - Zhaotongaspidae
        ⊞
        ⊟
        - Zhaotongaspis
        - Wenshanaspis
      - Huananaspiformes
        ⊞
        ⊟
        - Sanchaspidae
          - Sanchaspis
          - Antiquisagittaspis
        - - Gantarostrataspidae
            - Qushiaspis
            - - Gantarostrataspis
              - - Wumengshanaspis
                - Rhegmaspis
          - - Sanqiaspidae
              - Sanqiaspis
            - Huananaspidae
              - Nanpanaspinae
                - Asiaspis
                - - Stephaspis
                  - Nanpanaspis
              - - Huananaspinae
                  - Huananaspis
                - Macrothyraspinae
                  - Lungmenshanaspis
                  - - Qingmenaspis
                    - - Sinoszechuanaspis
                      - Macrothyraspis

== Paleoecology ==
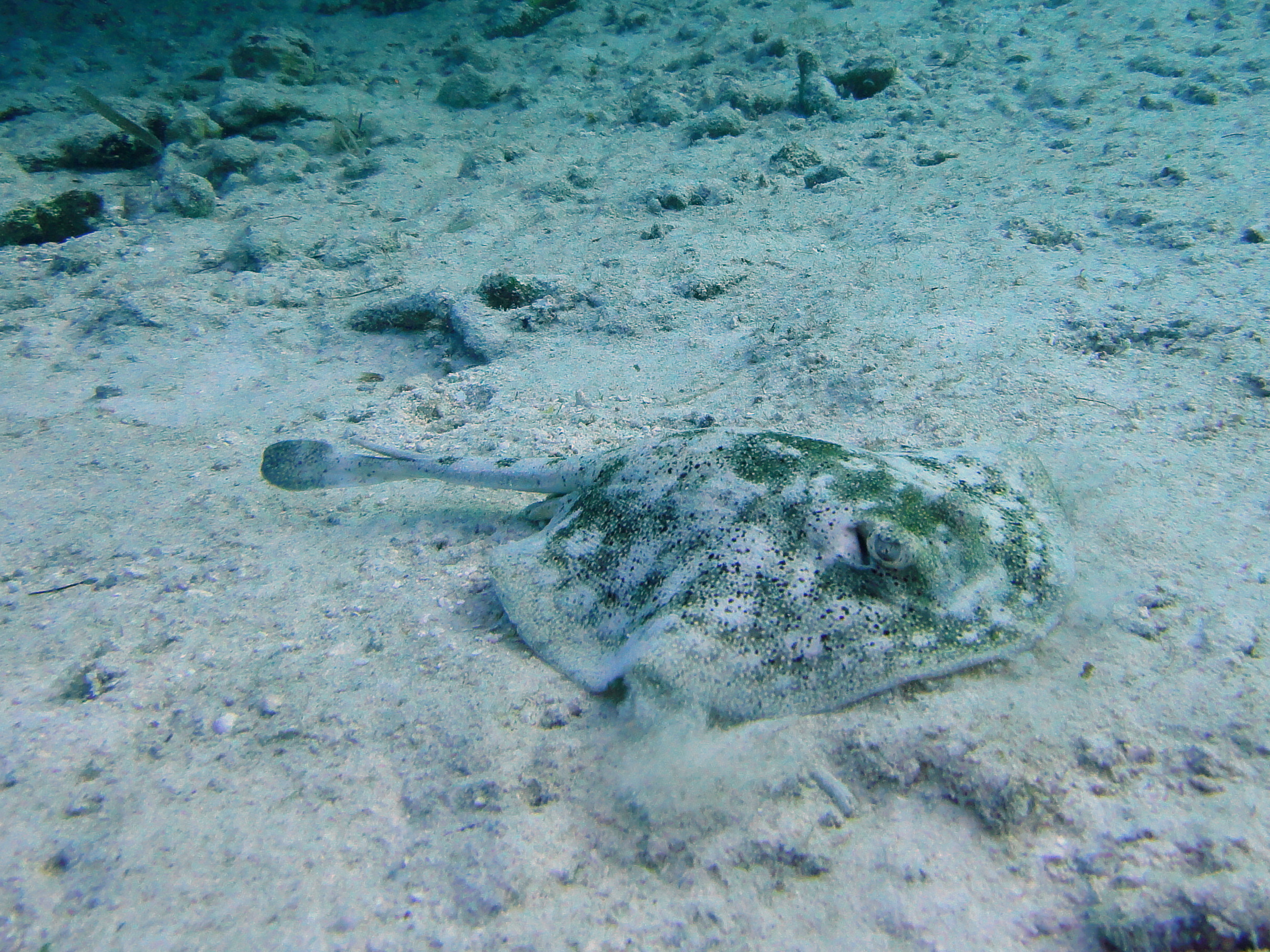
A stingray, one of the most well known group of modern epibenthic fish.

Like other basal members of Polybranchiaspiformes, Asioaspis has a wide headshield with a wide brim though most likely differed in lifestyle from other early members of the group. Unlike other early members, the less dorsal position of the eyes and the anatomy of the sensory canal system suggest that the fish had a more epibenthic lifestyle more similar to more derived genera. Due to this mix of features, Asioaspis most likely represented a transition between the semi-infaunal benthic lifestyle of early members and the epibenthic lifestyle seen in later ones.
