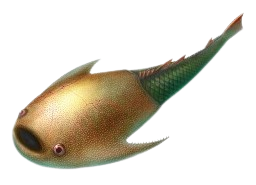
- Life restoration of Zhaotongaspis

Scientific classification
- Kingdom: Animalia
- Phylum: Chordata
- Infraphylum: Agnatha
- Class: †Galeaspida
- Family: †Zhaotongaspidae
- Genus: †Zhaotongaspis; Wang & Zhu, 1994

Type species
- †Zhaotongaspis janvieri Wang & Zhu, 1994

= Zhaotongaspis =

Zhaotongaspis Temporal range: Pragian, 409 Ma

Extinct genus of jawless fish

Zhaotongaspis is an extinct genus of polybranchiaspididan galeaspid jawless fish from Yunnan, China and is the namesake of the family Zhaotongaspidae. Its fossils are only known from the Posongchong Formation, which dates to the early Devonian. The fish is most well known for having one of the largest branchial fossae count of any vertebrate with estimates placing the total as between 35-40 fossae. There is currently only one species assigned to the genus: Z. janvieri.

== History and naming ==
The holotype of Zhaotongaspis (V9759.1.) and the two referred specimens were found in the fossil fish bearing horizon of the Posongchong Formation (then considered the "Cuifengshan Formation") located in the Zhaotong, Yunnan. The material was collected in May 1991, during an investigation of the locality by the Institute of Vertebrate Paleontology and Paleoanthropology (IVPP). The genus was later described by Junqing Wang and Min Zhu in 1994 based on the specimen collected during the field work. Due to a number of features including the largest number of branchial fossae in any vertebrate at the time, the authors would also coin the family Zhaotongaspidae.

The generic name Zhaotongaspis originates from the town of Zhaotong, the city where the holotype was discovered, and the Greek word for shield "aspis". The specific name "janvieri" is in reference to Dr. Philippe Janvier, a French paleontologist.

== Description ==
All three described specimens of Zhaotongaspis are represented by incomplete headshields though the holotype is the more complete of the three, mainly only missing the back portion of the shield. Though not preserved in either specimen, it is not believed that the fish had an elongate rostrum similar to what is seen in a number of other galeaspids. With this being the case, reconstructions estimate that the head shield of Zhaotongaspis would have most likely been around 50 millimetres (2.0 in) in length. The orbits were placed on the sides of the shield at the front of the skull right behind the median dorsal opening. This opening is incomplete in all specimens though is much larger than the orbits. Unlike the orbits which are circular, the median dorsal opening is much more ovoid and stretched transversely along the anterior edge of the shield. Right behind the orbits are a pair of long cornua that project backwards at around a 55°-65°. A total of 12-20 spine-like denticles are placed within the interior edge of the cornua, similar to what is seen in the body shield in some petalichthyids. The back half of the headshield is much more simple than the anterior half, with no projections being present. Other than those on the interior edge of the cornua, the denticles on the headshield of Zhaotongaspis are small.

The most notable feature of Zhaotongaspis is the large amount of branchial fossae. Due to the incomplete preservation of the material, the total number of these differ between papers with the original suggesting at least 31 in all with the original authors suggesting a more accurate range of between 35-40 fossae. Philippe Janvier later suggested that the total could have reached a total of 43 in a 2004 publication. In front of the entire branchial region, there are two pairs shallow depressions with the front pair being suggested to be a part of the nasal cavity and the back pair being the venous sinus of dorsal jugular vein. These are positioned at the levels of right in front of and in the middle of the orbits respectively. Though Zhaotongaspis still has one of the highest counts of branchial fossae it has been noted by authors like Janvier that the genus Dongfangaspis most likely had more with estimates placing it as having 45 branchial fossae. It has been suggested that the increase in branchial fossae in both of these genera was to compensate for the flattening of the fossae as their head shields also got shallower.

Due to the incomplete preservation of the specimens, the entire sensory line canal system of Zhaotongaspis is poorly preserved though parts of it can be seen as discontinuous impressions on the specimens. The supraorbital canals are not preserved. The anterior-most canal on the shield is the dorsal commissure which is positioned at the level of the anterior edge of the cornua. Lateral to the lateral dorsal canals, there are four pairs of lateral transverse canals which branch at their ends. Parts of the infraorbital canal and lateral dorsal canal are preserved in a single specimen but not very well.

== Classification ==
Due to the presence of a large number of branchial fossae on the headshield of Zhaotongaspis, Wang and Zhu suggested that the fish was most likely close to the family Duyunolepidae along with the genus Antiquisagittaspis. However, duyunolepids lack the large cornua seen in the genus and a phylogenic analysis was not carried out in the original description. This would not be done until 2007 when Min Zhu and Zhikun Gai would perform a major phylogenic analysis of Galeaspida in 2007 which would place the genus along with the later described genus Wenshanaspis into a family sister to Huananaspidiformes. Due to this placement, Zhaotongaspis is relatively closely related to Antiquisagittaspis as suggested by the original paper due to the genus being placed as an early huananaspidiform in the phylogeny. The phylogenic analysis from this publication can be found below:

- Agnatha
  - - Ateleaspis
    - Galeaspida
      - - Hanyangaspis
        - Changxingaspis
      - - Dayongaspis
        - - Eugaleaspidiformes
            - 'Sinogaleaspis' zhejiangensis
            - - - Anjiaspis
                - - 'Sinogaleaspis' xikengensis
                  - Meishanaspis
              - - Sinogaleaspis
                - - Yunnanogaleaspis
                  - - Nochelaspis
                    - - Pterogonaspis
                      - Eugaleaspis
          - Polybranchiaspida
            - - Geraspis
              - Kwangnanaspis
            - - Polybranchiaspidiformes
                - Gumuaspis
                - - - Pentathyraspis
                    - Microhoplonaspis
                  - - - Duyunolepis
                      - Lopadaspis
                    - - Bannhuanaspis
                      - - Dongfangaspis
                        - - Polybranchiaspis
                          - - Laxaspis
                            - Damaspis
              - - - Zhaotongaspis
                  - Wenshanaspis
                - Huananaspidiformes
                  - - Antiquisagittaspis
                    - Sanchaspis
                  - - - Gantarostrataspis
                      - Wumengshanaspis
                    - - Sanqiaspis
                      - - - Nanpanaspis
                          - Asiaspis
                        - - Huananaspis
                          - - Lungmenchanaspis
                            - - Qingmenaspis
                              - - Sinoszechuanaspis
                                - Macrothyraspis
