= Xujiachong Formation =

Geologic formation in China

- Stratigraphic range: Pragian
- Type: Geological formation
- Underlies: Chuandong Formation
- Overlies: Guijiatun Formation

Location
- Region: Yunnan
- Country: China

The Xujiachong Formation is an early Devonian formation from China. It preserves a wide range of plant and fish fossils, many being only known from this formation.

== Paleobiota ==
=== Plants ===
| Color key: Taxon / Reclassified taxon / Taxon falsely reported as present / Dubious taxon or junior synonym / Ichnotaxon / Ootaxon / Morphotaxon | Notes; Uncertain or tentative taxa are in small text; ~~crossed out~~ taxa are discredited. |

Plants
| Genus | Species | Higher taxon | Notes | Images |
|---|---|---|---|---|
| Adoketophyton | A. subverticillatum | Lycophyta | Synonymous with "Zosterophyllum spathulatum" | Adoketophyton reconstruction |
| Bracteophyton | B. variatum | Tracheophyta incertae sedis | Resembles lycophytes somewhat, but likely not one itself. | |
| Drepanophycus | D. qujingensis | Drepanophycales | Formerly placed within D. spinaeformis | |
| Guangnania | G. cuneata | Zosterophyllopsida | Unclear whether it truly is a zosterophyll, somewhat similar to Yunia | |
| Hedeia | H. sinica | Progymnospermopsida | Resembles both seed plants and trimerophytes | |
| Hsua | H. robusta, H. deflexa | Rhyniophyta? | | |
| Huia | H. gracilis | Zosterophyllales? | More slender than the type species | |
| Zosterophyllum | Z. yunnanicum, Z. australianum | Zosterophyllales | Used to date the Xujiachong Formation | Z. sp reconstruction |

=== Animals ===
Animals
| Genus | Species | Higher taxon | Notes | Images |
|---|---|---|---|---|
| Eugaleaspis | E. xujiachongensis | Galeaspida | Formerly placed under "Galeaspis", but this genus was preoccupied by the trilobite Galeaspis. | |
| Gantarostrataspis | G. gengi | Galeaspida | Mostly known from the Posongchong Formation | |
| Mizia | M. longhuaensis, M. parvus | Yunnanolepididae | M. parvus formerly placed within Yunnanolepis | M. longhuaensis reconstruction |
| Neopetalichthys | N. yenmenpaensis | Petalichthyida | Relatively basal member of the clade | N. yenmenpaensis reconstruction |
| Pampetalichthys | P. longhuaensis | Petalichthyida | Formerly classed as "Holopetalichthys" | |
| Pterogonaspis | P. yuhaii | Galeaspida | Similar to Tridenaspis | |
| Qushiaspis | Q. elaia | Galeaspida | Most basal member of Gantarostrataspididae. | |
| Sanqiaspis | S. rostrata | Galeaspida | Another species known from Vietnam | |
| Sanchaspis | S. magalarostrata | Galeaspida | Bears an unusual mushroom-shaped rostrum | |
| Szelepis | S. yunnanensis | Actinolepididae | Redescribed in 2017 | |
| Xichonolepis | X. qujingensis | Sinolepidae (Antiarchi) | | |
| Youngolepis | Y. praecursor | Dipnoi | Known from various other formations in early Devonian China | Y. praecursor fossil |
