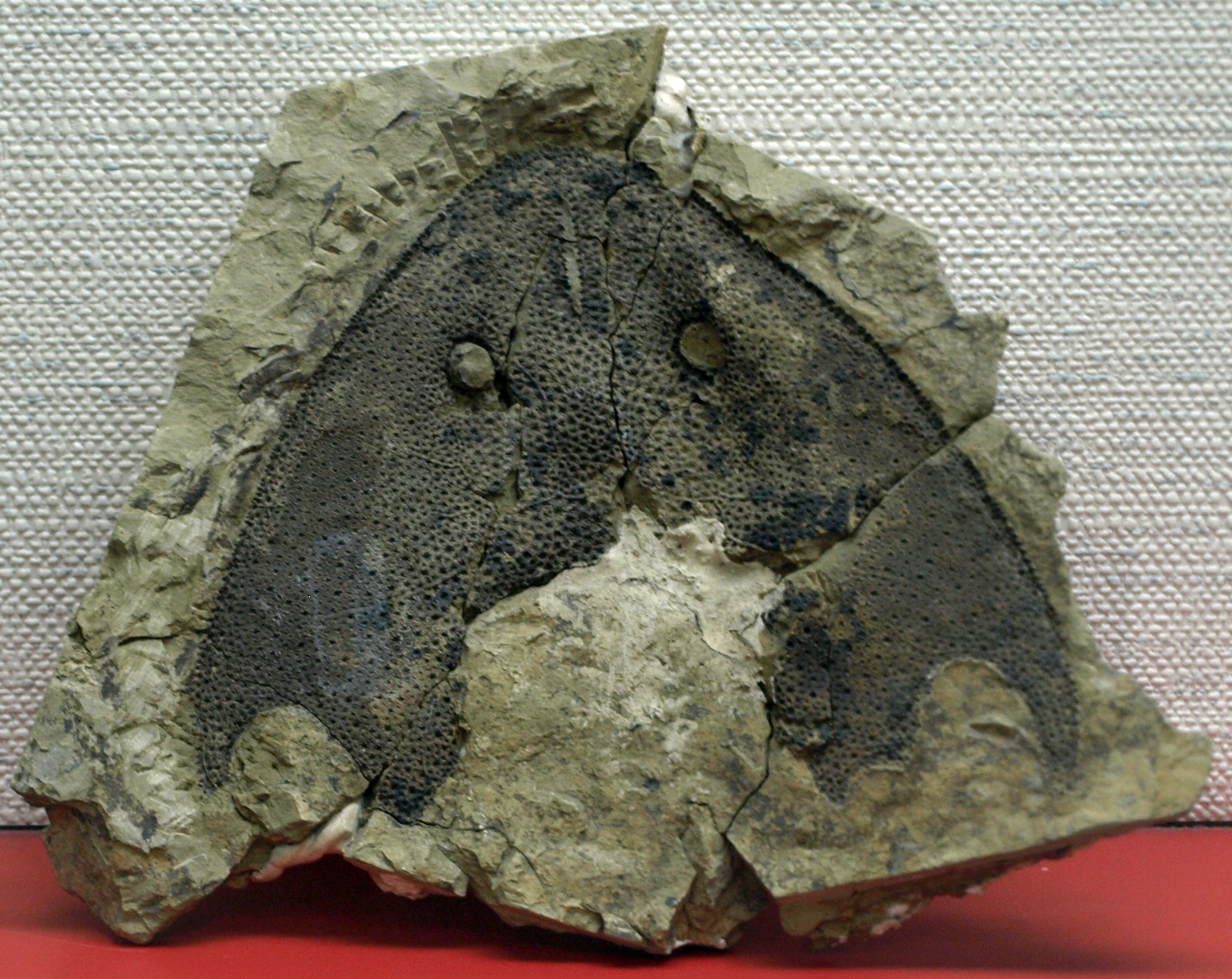
- Head shield of Nochelaspis

Scientific classification
- Domain: Eukaryota
- Kingdom: Animalia
- Phylum: Chordata
- Infraphylum: Agnatha
- Superclass: †Cephalaspidomorphi
- Class: †Galeaspida
- Order: †Eugaleaspidiformes
- Family: †Eugaleaspidae
- Genus: †Nochelaspis; Zhu, 1992
- Species: †N. maeandrina

Binomial name
- †Nochelaspis maeandrina Zhu, 1992

= Nochelaspis =

Nochelaspis Temporal range: Lochkovian, 416–412.3 Ma

Extinct genus of jawless vertebrates

Nochelaspis is an extinct genus of galeaspid vertebrates. It lived during the Lochkovian period in Lower Devonian East Asia (in today southeastern China and northern Vietnam).

== Description ==
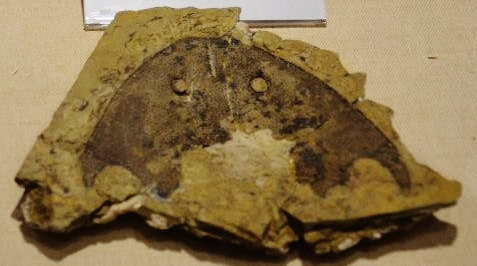
N. maendrinae at the Beijing Museum of Natural History

Nochelaspis is the largest eugaleaspid so far described. It is known from a head plate that was 127 mm (5.0 in) long, 158.5 mm (6.24 in) wide and 0.8 cm (0.3 in) thick. It is an element of the Early Vertebrate fauna in the Xishancun Formation, and lived among polybranchiaspid galeaspids, antiarchs, arthrodires, petalichthyids and osteichthyans.
