= Zhu Min =

Zhu Min or Min Zhu may refer to:

- Zhu Min (economist) (born 1952), Chinese economist
- Min Zhu (entrepreneur) (born 1948), Chinese-born American computer scientist, entrepreneur, and philanthropist
- Zhu Min (fencer) (born 1988), Chinese sabre fencer
- Zhu Min (Russian language professor) (1926–2009), Chinese professor and daughter of Zhu De
- Min Zhu (paleontologist) (born 1965), Chinese paleontologist

== See also ==
- Zhu (surname)
- Democracy#Translation which discusses the word 民主 mínzhǔ (reverse of "Zhu Min")
