= Xihaiaspis =

Xihaiaspis Temporal range: Telychian

Scientific classification
- Kingdom: Animalia
- Phylum: Chordata
- Infraphylum: Agnatha
- Class: †Galeaspida
- Family: †Dayongaspidae
- Genus: †Xihaiaspis; Zhang et al. 2026

Type species
- X. wuningensis Zhang et al. 2026

Extinct genus of jawless fish

Xihaiaspis is an extinct genus of galeaspid jawless fish belonging to the family Dayongaspidae, known from the early Silurian (Telychian age) Qingshui Formation of Jiangxi, China. It is the first record of a dayongaspid from the Lower Yangtze region. The genus contains a single species, Xihaiaspis wuningensis, described by Zhang and colleagues in 2026 based on 11 specimens.

== Discovery and naming ==
Xihaiaspis is known from 11 specimens, catalogued as IVPP V30966.1–11, which were recovered from outcrops of the Qingshui Formation in Wuning County of Jiangxi Province, China.

In 2026, Yumeng Zhang and colleagues named Xihaiaspis wuningensis as a new genus and species of galeaspid, designating IVPP V30966.1 as the holotype specimen. The generic name, Xihaiaspis, comes from the Xihai lake in Jiujiang, close to where the fossils were discovered. The specific name, wuningensis, comes from Wuning County, the county in which the fossils were discovered.

== Description ==
The holotype is a nearly complete, triangular-shaped headshield, missing the right and inner cornual processes. The cornual processes project laterally as short extensions from the headshield. The inner cornual processes are long, leaf-shaped structures, which are caudally projected and which extend far beyond the cornual process's posterior edge. The median dorsal ridge, however, does not extend posteriorly beyond the headshield's posterior margin, forming the median dorsal spine. The headshield's lateral margin is serrated.

The median dorsal opening is transversely aligned and has an elliptical outline with a short rostro-caudal aligned axis of the headshield. The length of the longer axis of the medial dorsal opening is ~4.5 times the length of the shorter axis.

The orbital openings are dorsally positioned on the headshield and have a round outline. The distance between the two orbital openings is approximately the same as the distance from the orbital openings to the headshield's lateral margin.

The pineal opening is small and round in shape and is positioned in the midline of the headshield in level with the posterior margin of the orbital openings.

== Phylogyny ==
The strict parsimony analysis done by Zhang et al. (2026) is given below:

- Galeaspida
  - - Hongshanaspis
    - Hanyangaspis
    - - Deanaspidae
        Deanichthys
      - Xiushuiaspidae
        - Xiushuiaspis
        - - Changxingaspis
          - Xiyuichthys
  - - Microphymaspis
    - Dayongaspidae
      - Xihaiaspis
      - Dayongaspis
    - - Eugaleaspidiformes
      - Polybranchiaspidida
        - Geraspidae
        - - Polybranchiaspiformes
          - - Zhaotongaspidae
            - Huananaspiformes
