= Deanichthys =

Deanichthys Temporal range: Telychian, ~436 Ma

Scientific classification
- Kingdom: Animalia
- Phylum: Chordata
- Infraphylum: Agnatha
- Class: †Galeaspida
- Family: †Dayongaspidae
- Genus: †Deanichthys; Zhang et al., 2026
- Species: †D. longpingi

Binomial name
- †Deanichthys longpingi Zhang et al., 2026

Synonyms
- Deanaspis Lin et al., 2025 (preoccupied)

Genus of jawless vertebrates

Deanichthys (meaning "De'an fish") is an extinct genus of jawless vertebrate from the Galeaspida which originated from the Silurian Xikeng Formation of De'an County, China. The type species is D. longpingi.

== Discovery and naming ==
The holotype is specimen IVPP V26188, a head shield, and it was recovered from a previously unknown outcrop of the Xikeng Formation located within Baishui town, De'an County, China. The specimen was then provided to the Nanjing Institute of Geology and Palaeontology, Chinese Academy of Sciences by Professor Yi Wang.

The specimen was named as "Deanaspis" longpingi by Lin et al. 2025, who were unaware that the genus name was a junior homonym by being already preoccupied by a trilobite named in 1975. Zhang et al. (2026) created the replacement name Deanichthys.

== Description and classification ==
Deanichthys shares traits found in members of both the Eugaleaspidiformes and the Xiushuiaspidae, including the longitudinal oval median dorsal opening in Eugaleaspidiformes and the long postbranchial division of the headshield found in members of the Xiushuiaspidae.

As a result of this assessment, Lin et al. (2025) placed Deanichthys within a new family named Deanaspidae. Zhang et al. (2026) instead placed Deanichthys within Dayongaspidae.
