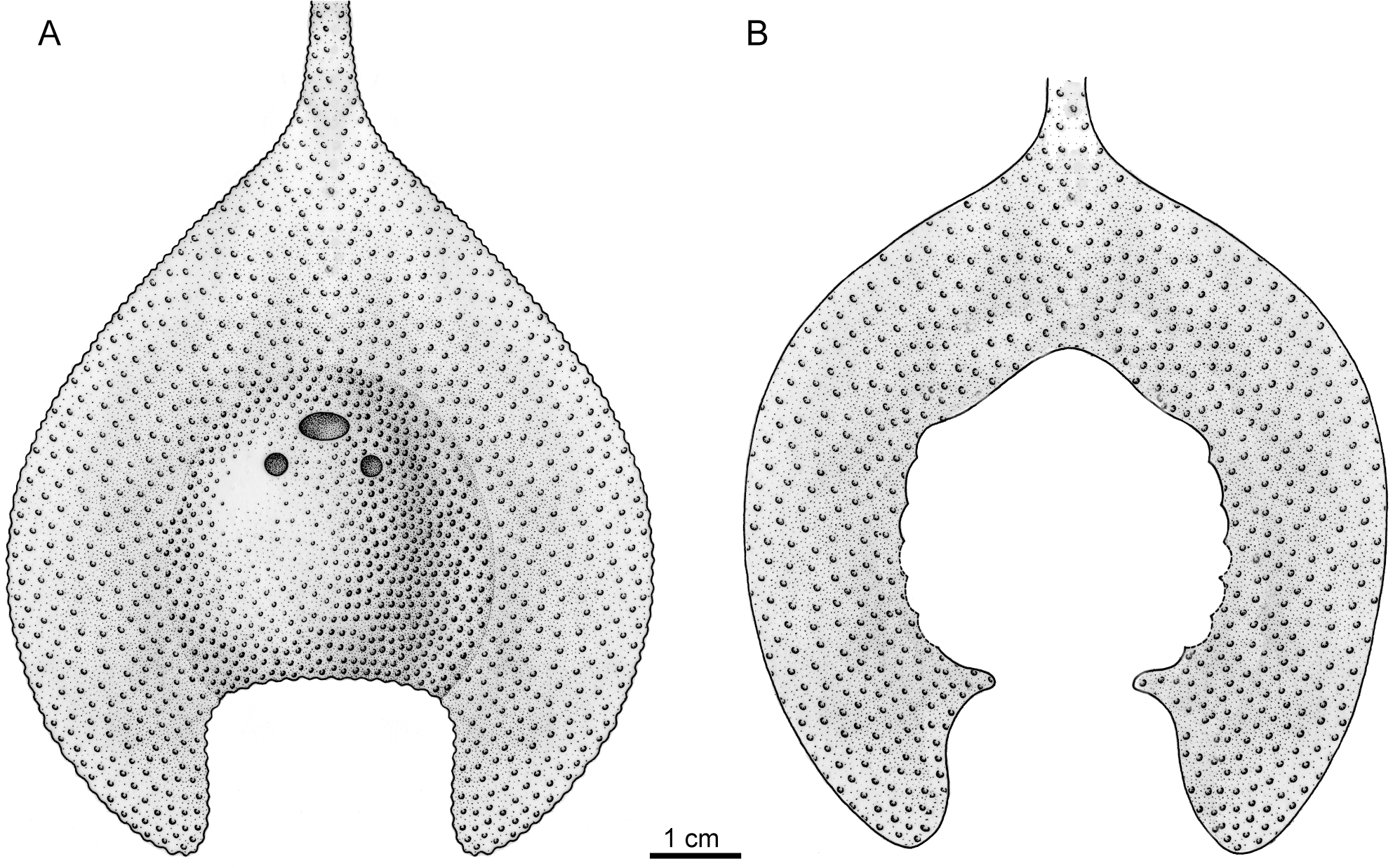
- Restoration of the headshield of Platylomaspis serratus
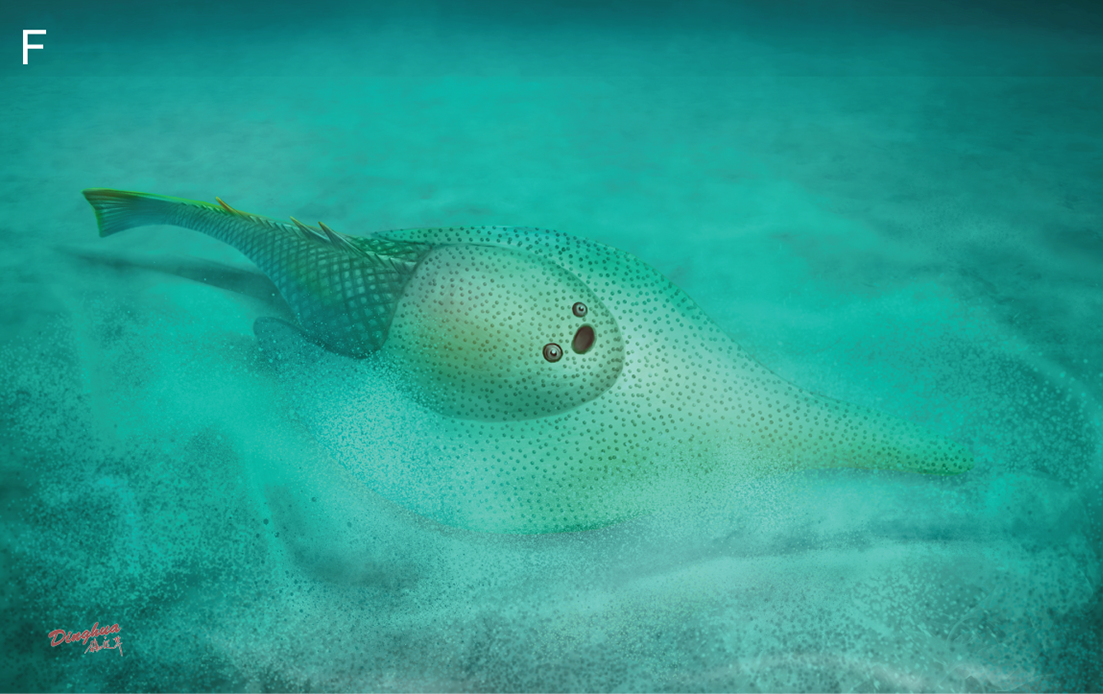
- Life reconstruction of Platylomaspis serratus

Scientific classification
- Kingdom: Animalia
- Phylum: Chordata
- Infraphylum: Agnatha
- Class: †Galeaspida
- Order: †Polybranchiaspiformes
- Family: †Gumuaspidae
- Genus: †Platylomaspis; Gai et al., 2018
- Species: †P. serratus

Binomial name
- †Platylomaspis serratus Gai et al., 2018

= Platylomaspis =

Platylomaspis Temporal range: Silurian, Llandovery (Telychian)

Extinct genus of jawless fishes

Platylomaspis is an extinct genus of polybranchiaspiform galeaspid known from the Telychian age (Llandovery, Silurian) of the Tataertag Formation (Kalpin County, Xinjiang, northwest China). As such, it is regarded as the oldest known polybranchiaspiform. The genus has associated to it the holotype GMC V 2415.1, a nearly complete ventral head shield, and the paratype GMC V 2415.1, an incomplete dorsal head shield.

== Etymology ==
The generic name is a composite of the Greek platy (broad), lom (brim) and aspis (shield), referencing the broad ventral rim of the head shield. The specific epithet serratus, Latin for "serrated", highlights the serrated lateral margin of the head shield.

== Description ==
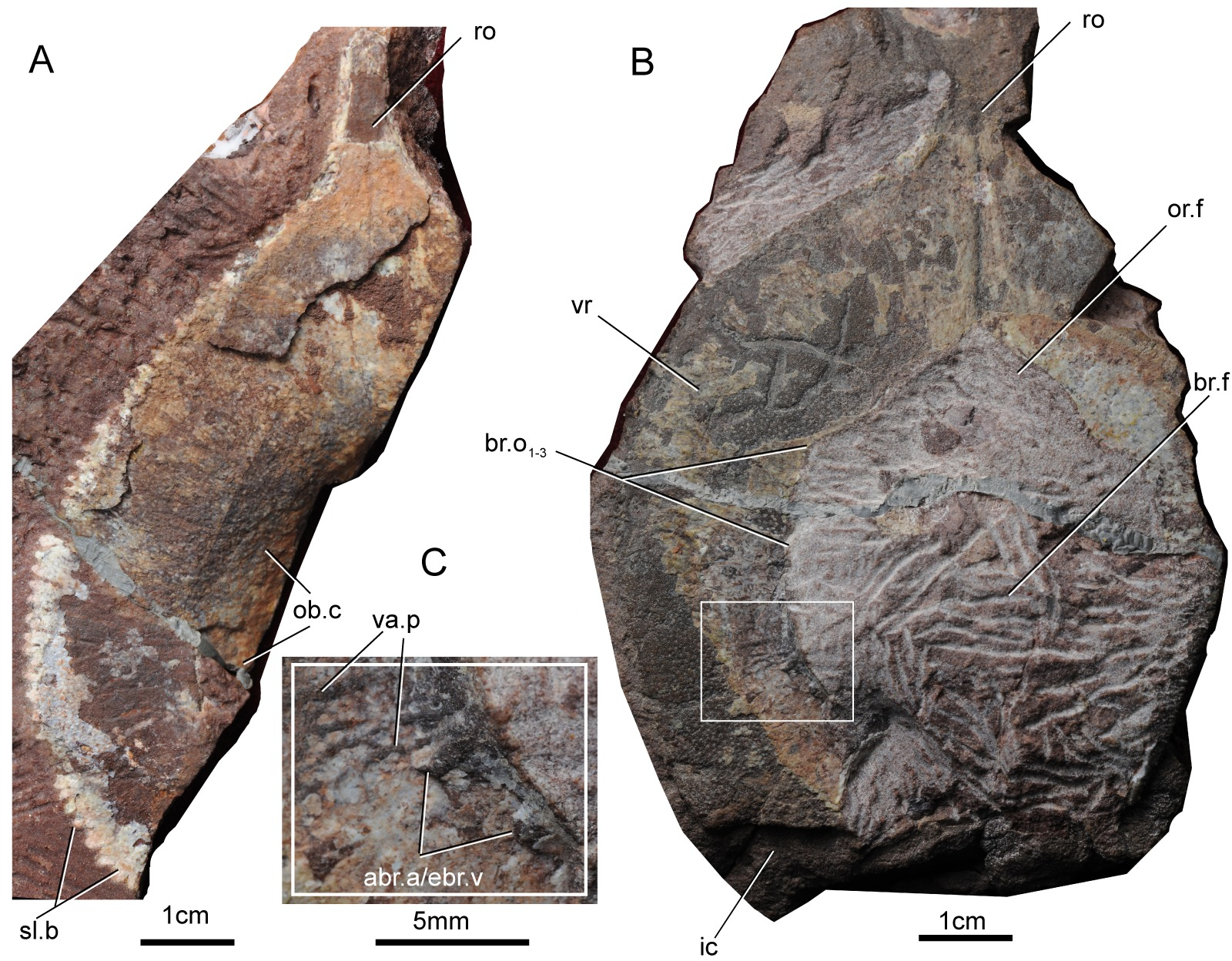
Paratype (A) and holotype (B) of Platylomaspis serratus, with a close-up of the latter's subcutaneous vascular plexi (C)

The head shield of Platylomaspis takes a broad pear shape, with a dome-shaped depression at its centre surrounded by a wide flattened marginal band that tapers rostrally into a long rostral process. The shield could reach a maximum width of 60-70 mm at the middle point and a length of 70–80 mm, excluding the rostral process. It is ornamented by coarse-granular tubercles and bears along its lateral marginal 5-6 serrations every 10 mm.

The rostral process of both specimens is only proximally preserved, but it is possible to interpret an anterior tapering of the same into a rod-like structure.

The flattened ventral region of the body, the ventral rim, is diagnostic in Platylomaspis for its dimension. It accounts for approximately one-fourth of the head-shield length at 20.0 mm. This is exceptionally broad for polybranchiaspiformes, which typically have it account for only one-tenth.

Although they are not preserved in the available material, certain features characteristic of galeaspids are expected to have been present in the dome-shaped depression, including orbital openings, where the eyes would be located, a mediodorsal opening, through which the intake of respiratory water would occur when the animal was buried in the sand, and a sensory canal system.

The dome encloses the oralo-branchial chamber that opens ventrally into the oralo-branchial fenestra, embraced by the ventral rim. This fenestra is anteriorly composed of a subtriangular form, the anterior oral fenestra and where the mouth would be located, that posteriorly widens into a large suborbicular shape, the posterior branchial fenestra, with 5–7 successive notches on each side that constitute the external branchial openings. In this way, Platylomaspis does not display the polybranchic condition (bearing a considerable number of gills) seen in many extinct jawless fishes.

== Phylogeny ==
An analysis by Zhang and colleagues in 2026 obtained the following phylogenetic tree by strict consensus of 6 maximum parsimony trees:

- Polybranchiaspiformes
  - Gumuaspidae
    - Gumuaspis
    - - Platylomaspis
      - Nanningaspis
  - - Asioaspidae
      Asioaspis
    - - Pentathyraspidae
        - Pentathyraspis
        - Microhoplonaspis
      - - Duyunolepidae
          - Lopadaspis
          - Foxaspis
          - Duyunolepis
        - Polybranchiaspidae
          - Dongfangaspis
          - Bannhuanaspis
          - - Polybranchiaspis
            - Altigibbaspis
            - - Laxaspis
              - - Damaspis
                - Cyclodiscaspis
