= Diploholcaspis =

Diploholcaspis Temporal range: Lower Devonian, Lochkovian

Scientific classification
- Kingdom: Animalia
- Phylum: Chordata
- Infraphylum: Agnatha
- Class: †Galeaspida
- Genus: †Diploholcaspis; Wang et al., 2009

Type species
- †Diploholcaspis daleensis Wang et al., 2009

Extinct genus of fishes

Diploholcaspis is an extinct genus of galeaspid jawless fish from Guangxi, China. Its fossils are known from the middle section of the Dayaoshan Group which dates to the Lower Devonian, making it the first early vertebrate to be described from the group. Diploholcaspis differs from other galeaspids due to the poorly developed sensory canal system represented by only a single pair of lateral transverse canals on the headshield. Due to this and a combination of features such as the headshield shape and the ornamentation, Diploholcaspis is regarded as incertae sedis within Galeaspida. Only one species is assigned to the genus: D. daleensis.

== History and naming ==
The holotype of Diploholcaspis (IVPP V 13763 a,b), a pair of external and internal molds of a headshield, was found in strata referred to the middle section of the Dayaoshan Group in Xiangzhou County, Guangxi, China. Though fossils have been found within the group previously, they are very uncommon. The holotype was described by Jun-Qing Wang and coauthors in 2009, making it the first early vertebrate remains described from the group.

The generic name of Diploholcaspis derives from Greek and translates to "dual-grooved shield" which refers to the simplified sensory canal system of the fish. The specific name "daleensis" refers to the fossil site which is named "Dale".

== Description ==
Diploholcaspis is a large galeaspid with the preserved length of the headshield being 12.3 centimetres (4.8 in) and an estimated total width of 18 centimetres (7.1 in). The shield of the fish is roughly trapezoidal in shape, with the back of the skull being much wider than the front. The posterior edge of the headshield is concave just past the corners, similar to a number of other galeaspids, only to become convex closer to the midline. The shield is largely slightly convex though there is an elliptical convex region which is positioned right behind the median dorsal opening. Both the orbital openings and median dorsal opening are positioned at the front of the headshield with the orbital openings being on the sides of the shield. The median dorsal opening has a wide, ovoid shape and is much larger than the orbital openings. The shield is ornamented with large round tubercles towards the edges and smaller fine tubercules closer to the midline. Unlike other galeaspids, the sensory canal system of Diploholcaspis is only made up of a single pair of lateral transverse canals which start towards the middle portion of the headshield, only to move backwards towards the back of the shield.

== Classification ==
The exact placement of Diploholcaspis is unknown with Jun-Qing Wang and coauthors making comparisons to multiple families throughout the class. The features of the orbital openings and median dorsal opening are reminiscent of Cyclodiscaspis, a member of Polybranchiaspididae. However, the sensory canal system and headshield shape of Diploholcaspis make this relation unlikely. Another comparison made by the authors is with the family Hanyangaspidae due to features such as the shape and ornamentation of the head shield. Similar to with comparisons made with Polybranchiaspididae, the sensory canal system of Diploholcaspis makes this relation unlikely. Due to this combination of features, Diploholcaspis is considered to be incertae sedis within Galeaspida.
