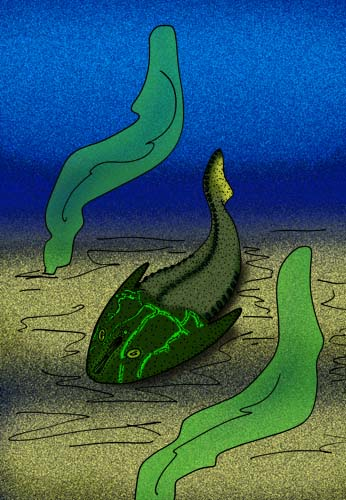
- Life reconstruction of Dunyu longiforus

Scientific classification
- Kingdom: Animalia
- Phylum: Chordata
- Infraphylum: Agnatha
- Class: †Galeaspida
- Order: †Eugaleaspidiformes
- Family: †Eugaleaspidae
- Genus: †Dunyu; Zhu et al., 2012

Type species
- †Dunyu longiforus Zhu et al., 2012

Species
- D. longiforus Zhu et al., 2012; D. tianlu Li et al., 2024; D. xiushanensis (Liu, 1983) Zhu et al., 2012

Synonyms
- Eugaleaspis xiushanensis Liu, 1983

= Dunyu =

Dunyu Temporal range: Silurian, 433–422 Ma

Extinct genus of jawless vertebrates

Dunyu (盾魚 meaning "shield fish" in Hanyu Pinyin) is an extinct genus of eugaleaspidiform galeaspid known from the Silurian of Yunnan, southwestern China. Two species are known: D longiforus, the type species and D. xiushanensis, which was initially named as a species of Eugaleaspis. The type specimen of D. longiforus is IVPP V 17681, a complete cephalic shield prepared by C. H. Xiong, and the holotype of D. xiushanensis is IVPP V 6793.1, another complete cephalic shield.
