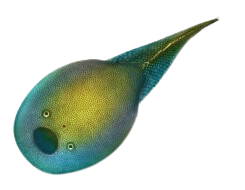
- Life restoration of Duyonolepis

Scientific classification
- Kingdom: Animalia
- Phylum: Chordata
- Infraphylum: Agnatha
- Class: †Galeaspida
- Order: †Polybranchiaspiformes
- Family: †Duyunolepidae
- Genus: †Duyunolepis; Pan & Wang, 1982
- Species: †D. paoyangensis

Binomial name
- †Duyunolepis paoyangensis (P’an & Wang, 1978a) Pan & Wang, 1982

Synonyms
- Duyunaspis P’an & Wang, 1978a [junior homonym of Duyunaspis Zhang & Qian, 1977, a trilobite]

= Duyunolepis =

Duyunolepis Temporal range: Emsian

Extinct genus of jawless fishes

Duyunolepis is an extinct genus of polybranchiaspiform galeaspid known from the Emsian age (Early Devonian) of the Shujiaping Formation (Duyun, Guizhou, southwestern China). It is represented by the single species Duyunolepis paoyangensis.

== Description ==
The head shield of Duyunolepis takes a slightly elliptical shape, approximately measuring 90 mm long and 60 mm wide. This shield is dorsally markedly arched, and its cross section is semicircular in shape. It is ornamented with polygonal scale-units.

The rostral margin of this structure is rounded and blunt. From that region, the lateral margins gradually arch inwards through the length of the head shield which, at the posterior margin, elongates to form a bluntly tipped posterior mesodorsal process. This notably results in the absence of an inner corner.

Present in the dorsal face of the head shield, the mediodorsal opening, through which the intake of respiratory water would occur, was positioned distant to the rostral margin and had a large subcircular shape, slightly wider than long. Slightly posterior to the posteriormost limit of the mesodorsal opening, there are two small orbital openings, where the eyes would be located. A pineal opening is located at the level of the posterior margin of the orbital openings. A sensory canal system is not known.

The animal had 20 pairs of branchial openings.

== Phylogeny ==
An analysis by Zhang and colleagues in 2026 obtained the following phylogenetic tree by strict consensus of 6 maximum parsimony trees:

- Polybranchiaspiformes
  - Gumuaspidae
    - Gumuaspis
    - - Platylomaspis
      - Nanningaspis
  - - Asioaspidae
      Asioaspis
    - - Pentathyraspidae
        - Pentathyraspis
        - Microhoplonaspis
      - - Duyunolepidae
          - Lopadaspis
          - Foxaspis
          - Duyunolepis
        - Polybranchiaspidae
          - Dongfangaspis
          - Bannhuanaspis
          - - Polybranchiaspis
            - Altigibbaspis
            - - Laxaspis
              - - Damaspis
                - Cyclodiscaspis
