= Jiangxialepis =

Jiangxialepis Temporal range: Telychian

Scientific classification
- Kingdom: Animalia
- Phylum: Chordata
- Infraphylum: Agnatha
- Class: †Galeaspida
- Order: †Eugaleaspidiformes
- Family: †Shuyuidae
- Genus: †Jiangxialepis; Liu et al., 2021

Type species
- Jiangxialepis retrospina Liu et al., 2021

Other species
- Jiangxialepis jiujiangensis Shan et al., 2023 Jiangxialepis rongi Liu et al., 2023

Extinct genus of eugaleaspidiform fish

Jiangxialepis is an extinct genus of eugaleaspidiform fish that lived in what is now China during the Telychian stage of the Llandovery epoch.

== Description ==
Jiangxialepis retrospina, the type species, is distinguished from other shuyuids by the presence of a middle dorsal spine, its anterior end of the median dorsal opening slightly disrupting the rostral margin of the head shield, its large and oval-shaped orbital openings, its pineal opening being level with the centre of the orbital opening, and its seven lateral transverse canals on each side. Jiangxialepis jiujiangensis differs from J. retrospina because it possesses narrow spine-shaped inner cornual processes as well as a sharp and posteriorly positioned median dorsal spine. Jiangxialepis rongi, meanwhile, is distinguished from both the other two Jiangxialepis species by its broader headshield and the serrated margin of the headshield and median dorsal opening.
