= Xikeng Formation =

Geologic formation in China

- Stratigraphic range: Telychian–Early Devonian
- Type: Geological formation
- Underlies: Xiaoxi Formation
- Overlies: Xiajiaqiao Formation

Lithology
- Primary: Sandy mudstone, siltstone
- Other: Sandstone

Location
- Location: Xiushui County
- Region: Jiangxi Province
- Country: China

The Xikeng Formation is located in Xiushui County, Jiangxi Province, and contains alternating beds of purplish red, grayish green and yellow green sandy and muddy rocks. The Xikeng Formation is dated to the Late Silurian - Early Devonian period.

A new outcrop was identified within Baishui town in 2025 which extended the age of the Xikeng Formation to 436 million years ago.
