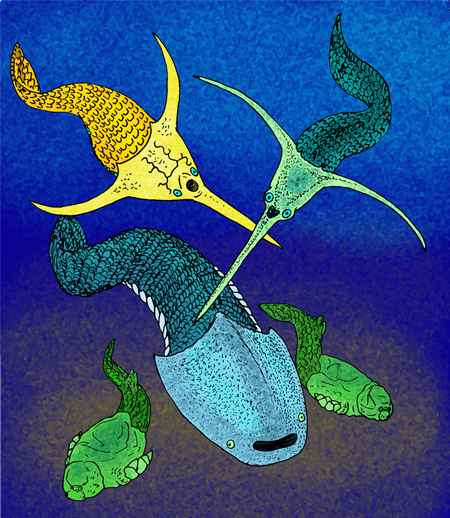

Scientific classification
- Kingdom: Animalia
- Phylum: Chordata
- Infraphylum: Agnatha
- Class: †Galeaspida; Liu, 1965

Orders
- Eugaleaspidiformes Liu, 1965; Huananaspidiformes Janvier, 1975; Polybranchiaspidiformes Janvier, 1996

= Galeaspida =

Galeaspida Temporal range: Llandovery–Early Devonian, 438–400 Ma

Class of chordates

Galeaspida (from Latin, 'Helmet shields') is an extinct taxon of jawless marine and freshwater fish. The name is derived from galea, the Latin word for helmet, and refers to their massive bone shield on the head. Galeaspida lived in shallow, fresh water and marine environments during the Silurian and Devonian times (430 to 370 million years ago) in what is now Southern China, Tibet and Vietnam. Superficially, their morphology appears more similar to that of Heterostraci than Osteostraci, there being currently no evidence that the galeaspids had paired fins. A galeaspid Tujiaaspis vividus from the Silurian period of China was described in 2022 as having a precursor condition to the form of paired fins seen in Osteostraci and gnathostomes. Earlier than this, Galeaspida were already in fact regarded as being more closely related to Osteostraci, based on the closer similarity of the morphology of the braincase.

== Morphology ==
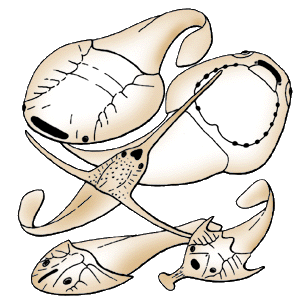
Galeaspids are morphologically diverse. Hanyangaspis dorsal view (top left) and ventral view (top right); Lungmenshanaspis (middle) and Sanchaspis (bottom right), both hunanaspidiforms; Eugaleaspis (bottom left), an eugaleaspidiform.

The defining characteristic of all galeaspids was a large opening on the dorsal surface of the head shield, which was connected to the pharynx and gill chamber, and a scalloped pattern of the sensory-lines. The opening appears to have served both the olfaction and the intake of the respiratory water similar to the nasopharyngeal duct of hagfishes. Galeaspids are also the vertebrates which have the largest number of gills, as some species of the order Polybranchiaspidida (literally "many gills shields") had up to 45 gill openings. The body is covered with minute scales arranged in oblique rows and there is no other fin besides the caudal fin.

The mouth and gill openings are situated on the ventral surface of the head, which is flat or flattened and suggests that they were bottom-dwellers. In the most primitive forms, such as the Silurian genus Hanyangaspis, the median dorsal inhalent opening is broad and situated anteriorly. In other galeaspids, it is more posterior in position and can be oval, rounded, heart-shaped or slit-shaped. In some Devonian galeaspids, such as the hunanaspidiforms Lungmenshanaspis and Sanchaspis, the headshield is produced laterally and anteriorly into slender processes. The eugaleaspidiforms, such as Eugaleaspis have a horseshoe-shaped headshield and a slit-shaped median dorsal opening, which imitates the aspect of the headshield of osteostracans.

== Fossil record ==
The oldest known galeaspids, such as those of the genera Hanyangaspis and Dayongaspis, first appear near the start of the Telychian age, of the latter half of the Llandovery epoch of the Silurian, about 436 million years ago. During the transition from the Llandovery to the Wenlock, the Eugaleaspids underwent a diversification event. By the time the Wenlock epoch transitioned into the Ludlow Epoch, all of the eugaleaspids, save for the Eugaleaspidae, were extinct. The Eugaleaspidae lived from the Wenlock, and were fairly long-lived, especially the genus Eugaleaspis. The last of the Eugaleaspididae disappeared by the end of the Pragian Epoch of the Lower Devonian.

The first genus of Geraspididae, the eponymous Geraspis, appears during the middle of the Telychian. The other genera of Polybranchiaspidida appear in the fossil record a little after the beginning of the Lochkovian Epoch, at the start of the Devonian. The vast majority of the supraorder's genera either date from the Pragian epoch, or have their ranges end there. By the time the Emsian epoch starts, only a few genera, such as Duyunolepis and Wumengshanaspis, survive, with most others already extinct. The last galeaspid is an as yet undescribed species and genus from the Fammenian epoch of the Late Devonian, found in association with the tetrapod Sinostega and the antiarch placoderm Remigolepis, in strata from the Northern Chinese province of Ningxia.

== Taxonomy ==
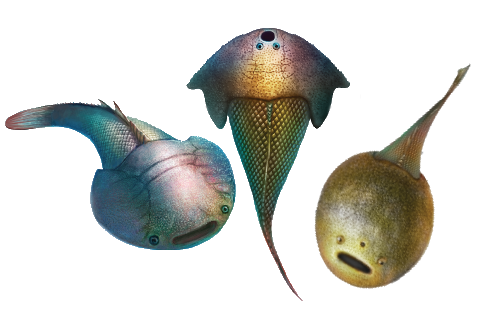
Reconstruction of the basal galeaspids Hanyangaspis (left), Dayongaspis (middle), and Xiushuiaspis (right)

There are around 76 + described species of galeaspids in at least 53 genera.

If the families Hanyangaspidae and Xiushuiaspidae can be ignored as basal galeaspids, the rest of Galeaspida can be sorted into two main groups: the first being the order Eugaleaspidiformes, which comprises the genera Sinogaleaspis, Meishanaspis, and Anjianspis, and the family Eugaleaspididae, and the second being the Supraorder Polybranchiaspidida, which comprises the order Polybranchiaspidiformes, which is the sister taxon of the family Zhaotongaspididae and the order Huananaspidiformes, and the family Geraspididae, which is the sister taxon of Polybranchiaspidiformes + Zhaotongaspididae + Huananaspidiformes.

Some experts demote Galeaspida to the rank of subclass, and unite it with Pituriaspida and Osteostraci to form the class Monorhina.

=== Internal phylogeny ===
Analyses by Zhang and colleagues in 2026 obtained the following phylogenetic tree by strict consensus of 6 maximum parsimony trees:

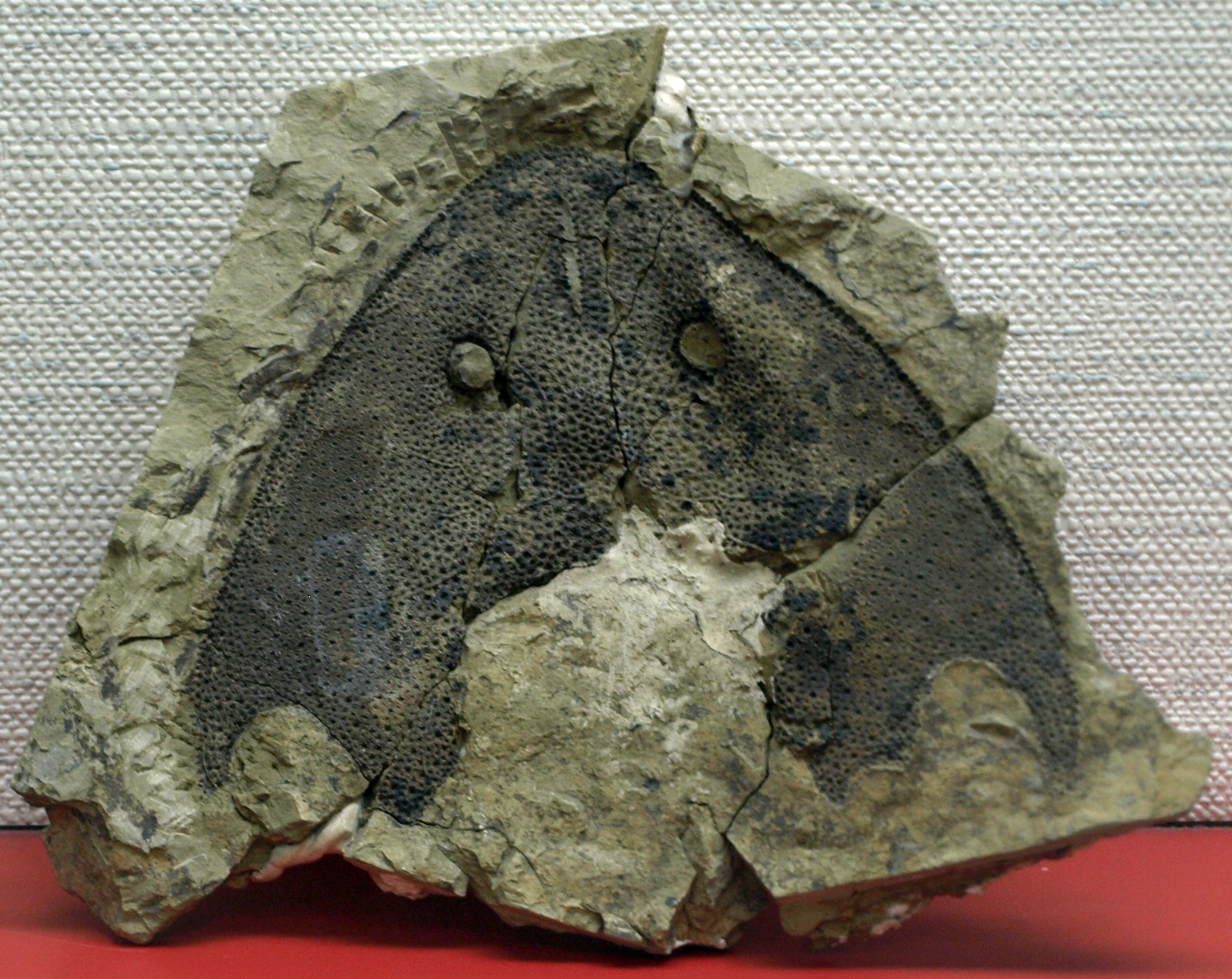
Headshield of Nochelaspis

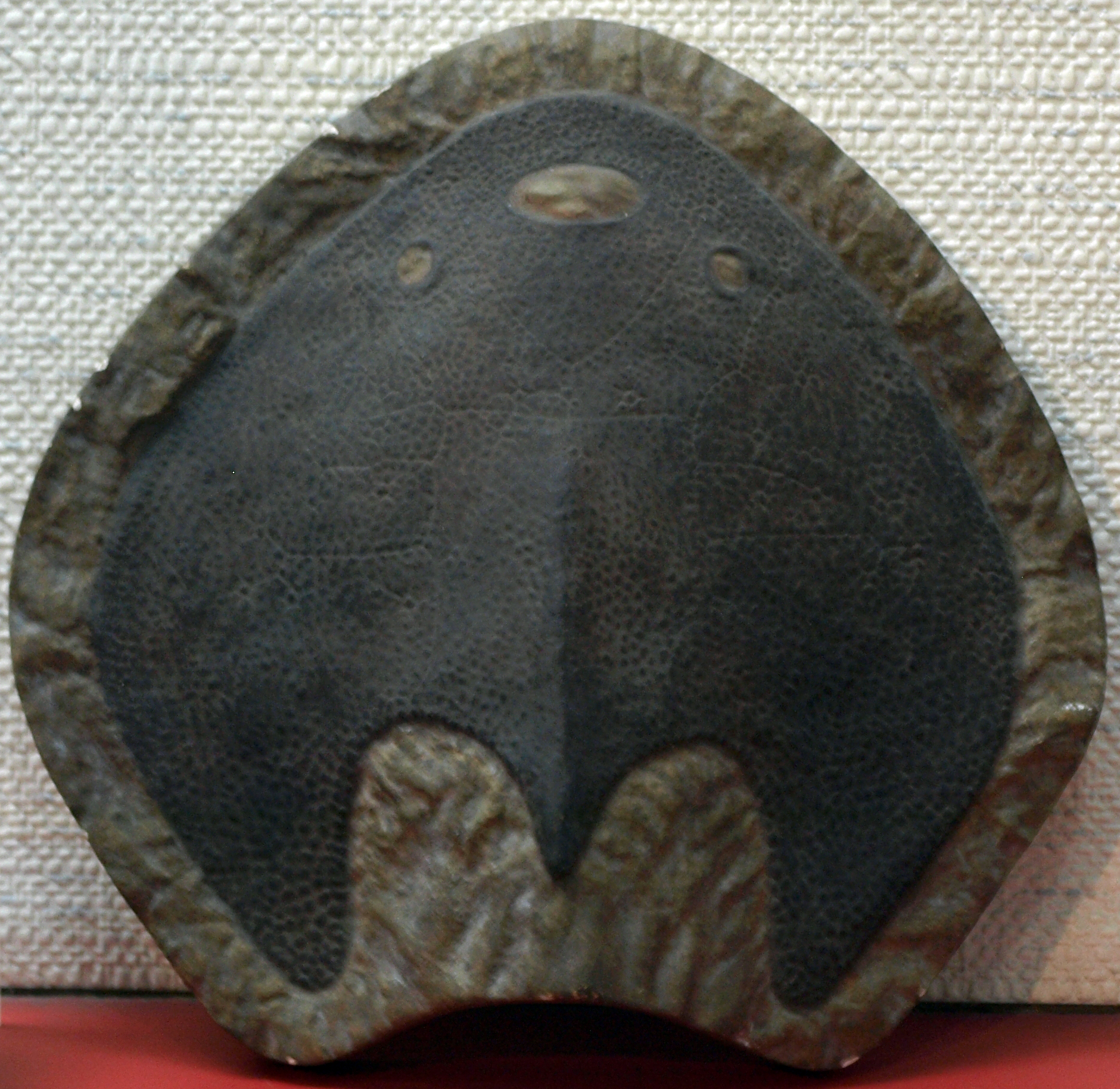
Headshield of Laxaspis

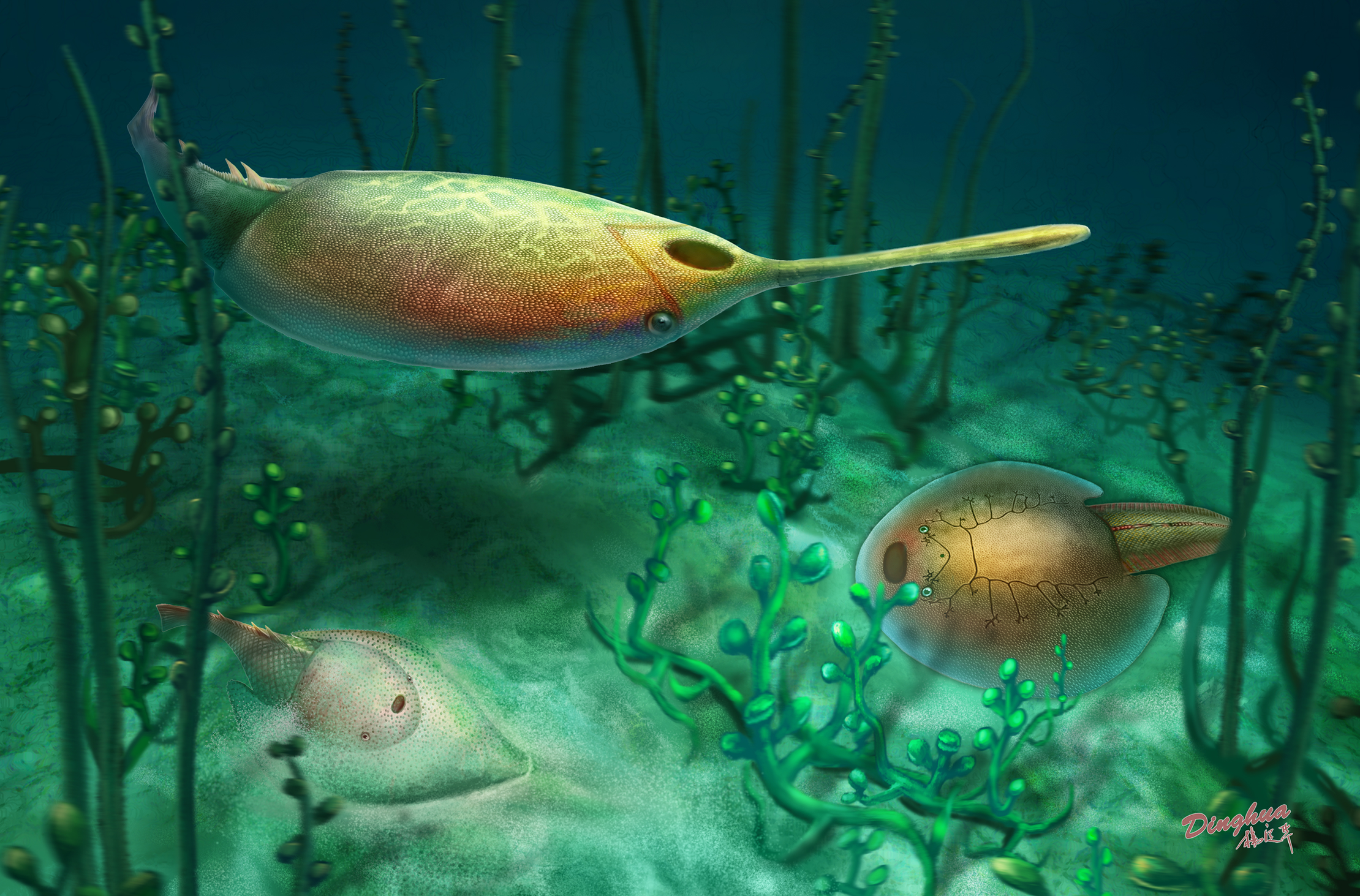
Restoration of Rhegmaspis, Dongfangaspis, and Nanningaspis

- Agnatha
  - Ateleaspis
  - Galeaspida
    - - Hongshanaspis
      - Hanyangaspis
      - - Deanaspidae
          Deanichthys
        - Xiushuiaspidae
          - Xiushuiaspis
          - - Changxingaspis
            - Xiyuichthys
    - - Microphymaspis
      - Dayongaspidae
        - Xihaiaspis
        - Dayongaspis
      - - Eugaleaspidiformes
          ⊞
          ⊟
          - Tujiaaspidae
            - Miaojiaaspis
            - Tujiaaspis
          - Shuyuidae
            - Shuyu
            - Meishanaspis
            - - Qingshuiaspis
              - Jiangxialepis
          - - Anjiaspis
            - - Sinogaleaspidae
                - Sinogaleaspis
                - Rumporostralis
              - - Yongdongaspidae
                  Yongdongaspis
                - - Yunnanogaleaspis
                  - - Nochelaspis
                    - - Tridensaspidae
                        - Falxcornus
                        - - Tridensaspis
                          - Pterogonaspis
                      - Eugaleaspidae
                        - Eugaleaspis
                        - - Xitunaspis
                          - Dunyu
        - Polybranchiaspidida
          - Geraspidae
            - Geraspis
            - Kwangnanaspis
          - - Polybranchiaspiformes
              ⊞
              ⊟
              - Gumuaspidae
                - Gumuaspis
                - - Platylomaspis
                  - Nanningaspis
              - - Asioaspidae
                  Asioaspis
                - - Pentathyraspidae
                    - Pentathyraspis
                    - Microhoplonaspis
                  - - Duyunolepidae
                      - Lopadaspis
                      - Foxaspis
                      - Duyunolepis
                    - Polybranchiaspidae
                      - Dongfangaspis
                      - Bannhuanaspis
                      - - Polybranchiaspis
                        - Altigibbaspis
                        - - Laxaspis
                          - - Damaspis
                            - Cyclodiscaspis
            - - Zhaotongaspidae
                - Zhaotongaspis
                - Wenshanaspis
              - Huananaspiformes
                ⊞
                ⊟
                - Sanchaspidae
                  - Sanchaspis
                  - Antiquisagittaspis
                - - Gantarostrataspidae
                    - Qushiaspis
                    - - Gantarostrataspis
                      - - Wumengshanaspis
                        - Rhegmaspis
                  - - Sanqiaspidae
                      Sanqiaspis
                    - Huananaspidae
                      - Nanpanaspinae
                        - Asiaspis
                        - - Stephaspis
                          - Nanpanaspis
                      - - Huananaspinae
                          Huananaspis
                        - Macrothyraspinae
                          - Lungmenshanaspis
                          - - Qingmenaspis
                            - - Sinoszechuanaspis
                              - Macrothyraspis

=== Subdivisions and genera ===
- Genus Hyperaspis Pan, 1992 (homonym)
- Genus Pseudoduyunaspis Wang, Wang & Zhu, 1996
- Genus Diploholcaspis Wang et al. 2009
- Genus Jiaoyu Liu et al., 2019
- Genus Microphymaspis Wang et al., 2002
- Family Hanyangaspididae Pan & Liu, 1975
  - Genus Hanyangaspis Pan & Liu, 1975
  - Genus Nanjiangaspis Wang et al., 2002
  - Genus Kalpinolepis Wang, Wang & Zhu, 1996
  - Genus Konoceraspis Pan, 1992
  - Genus Hongshanaspis Yilong et al., 2021
  - Genus Latirostraspis Wang, Xia & Chen, 1980
- Family Deanaspidae Lin et al., 2025
  - Genus Deanichthys Zhang et al., 2026 [Deanaspis Hughes, Ingham & Addison, 1975]
- Family Xiushuiaspididae Pan & Liu, 1975
  - Genus Changxingaspis Wan, 1991
  - Genus Xiushuiaspis Pan & Wang, 1983
  - Genus Xiyuichthys (Liu et al., 2019)
- Family Dayongaspidae Pan & Zen, 1985
  - Genus Dayongaspis Pan & Zen, 1985
  - Genus Platycaraspis Wang et al., 2002
  - Genus Xihaiaspis Zhang et al., 2026
- Order Eugaleaspidiformes Liu, 1980
  - Genus Anjiaspis Gai & Zhu, 2005
  - Genus Yunnanogaleaspis Pan & Wang, 1980
  - Genus Nochelaspis Zhu, 1992
  - Family Tujiaaspidae Chen et al., 2024
    - Genus Miaojiaaspis Chen et al., 2024
    - Genus Tujiaaspis Gai et al., 2022
  - Family Shuyuidae Shan et al., 2020
    - Genus Meishanaspis Wang, 1991
    - Genus Shuyu Gai et al., 2011
    - Genus Qingshuiaspis Shan et al, 2022
    - Genus Jiangxialepis Liu et al., 2021
  - Family Sinogaleaspidae Pan & Wang, 1980
    - Genus Sinogaleaspis Pan & Wang, 1980
    - Genus Rumporostralis Shan et al., 2020
  - Family Yongdongaspidae Chen et al., 2022
    - Genus Yongdongaspis Chen et al., 2022
  - Family Tridensaspidae Liu, 1986
    - Genus Pterogonaspis Zhu, 1992
    - Genus Tridensaspis Liu, 1986
    - Genus Falxcornus Meng & Gai, 2021
    - Genus Bataspis Meng, Ferrón, Pisani, Gai & Donoghue, 2026
  - Family Eugaleaspididae Liu, 1980
    - Genus Dunyu Zhu et al., 2012
    - Genus Eugaleaspis Liu, 1980 [Galeaspis Liu 1965 non Ivshin ex Borukaev 1955]
    - Genus Xitunaspis Sun et al., 2022
- Superorder Polybranchiaspidida Liu, 1965
  - Family Geraspididae Pan & Chen, 1993
    - Genus Geraspis Pan & Chen, 1993
    - Genus Kwangnanaspis Cao, 1979
  - Family Zhaotongaspididae Wang & Zhu, 1994
    - Genus Zhaotongaspis Wang & Zhu, 1994
    - Genus Wenshanaspis Zhao, Zhu & Jia, 2002
  - Order Polybranchiaspidiformes Janvier, 1996
    - Family Gumuaspididae Gai et al., 2018
      - Genus Gumuaspis Wang & Wang, 1992
      - Genus Platylomaspis Gai et al., 2018
      - Genus Nanningaspis Gai et al., 2018
      - Genus Pseudolaxaspis Gai et al., 2018
    - Family Asioaspidae Zhang et al., 2026
      - Genus Asioaspis Zhang et al., 2026
    - Family Pentathyraspididae Pan, 1992
      - Genus Pentathyraspis Pan, 1992
      - Genus Microhoplonaspis Pan, 1992
    - Family Duyunolepididae Pan & Wang, 1978a
      - Genus Duyunolepis Pan & Wang, 1982
      - Genus Paraduyunaspis P’an et Wang, 1978a
      - Genus Neoduyunaspis P’an et Wang, 1978a
      - Genus Lopadaspis Wang et al., 2002
      - Genus Foxaspis Gai et al., 2023
    - Family Polybranchiaspididae Liu, 1965
      - Genus Polybranchiaspis Liu, 1965
      - Genus Cyclodiscaspis Liu, 1975
      - Genus Diandongaspis Liu, 1975
      - Genus Dongfangaspis Liu, 1975
      - Genus Laxaspis Liu, 1975
      - Genus Damaspis Wang & Wang, 1982
      - Genus Siyingia Wang & Wang, 1982
      - Genus Bannhuanaspis Janvier, Than & Phuon, 1993
      - Genus Clororbis Pan & Ji, 1993
      - Genus Altigibbaspis Liu, Gai & Zhu, 2017
  - Order Huananaspidiformes Janvier, 1975
    - Family Sanchaspididae Pan & Wang, 1981
      - Genus Sanchaspis Pan & Wanao, 1981
      - Genus Antiquisagittaspis Liu, 1985
    - Family Gantarostrataspididae Wang & Wang, 1992
      - Genus Gantarostrataspis Wang & Wang, 1992
      - Genus Wumengshanaspis Wang & Lan, 1984
      - Genus Rhegmaspis Gai et al., 2015
      - Genus Qushiaspis Jiang et al., 2021
    - Family Sanqiaspididae Liu, 1975
      - Genus Sanqiaspis Liu, 1975
    - Family Huananaspidae Liu, 1973
      - Subfamily Nanpanaspinae
        - Genus Asiaspis Pan ex Pan, Wang & Liu, 1975
        - Genus Stephaspis Gai & Zhu, 2007
        - Genus Nanpanaspis Liu, 1965
      - Subfamily Huanaspinae
        - Genus Huanaspis Liu, 1973
      - Subfamily Macrothyraspinae
        - Genus Macrothyraspis Pan, 1992
        - Genus Lungmenshanaspis Pan & Wang, 1975
        - Genus Qingmenaspis Pan & Wang, 1981
        - Genus Sinoszechuanaspis Pan & Wang, 1975

=== External phylogeny ===
Phylogeny of jawless fish after Reeves and colleagues, 2023:

- Vertebrata total group
  - †Haikouella
  - - †Metaspriggina
    - †Myllokunmingiida
    - Vertebrata crown group
      - Cyclostomi total group
        - †Anaspida
          - †Birkeniida
          - - †Lasanius
            - - †Jamoytius
              - †Euphanerops
        - - †Euconodonta
          - Cyclostomi crown group
            - Myxinoidea
            - Petromyzontida
      - Gnathostomata total group
        - †Pteraspidomorphi
          - †Astraspis
          - - †Arandaspida
            - †Heterostraci
        - - †Thelodonti
            - †Furcacaudiformes
            - †Thelodontiformes
          - - †Pituriaspida
            - - †Galeaspida
              - - †Osteostraci
                - Gnathostomata (traditional usage)
                  - †Antiarchi
                  - - †Arthrodira
                    - Gnathostomata crown group
                      - Osteichthyes
                      - Chondrichthyes

== See also ==
- Osteostraci
- Heterostraci
