= Yongdongaspis =

Yongdongaspis Temporal range: Llandovery, ~436 Ma Telychian

Scientific classification
- Kingdom: Animalia
- Phylum: Chordata
- Infraphylum: Agnatha
- Class: †Galeaspida
- Order: †Eugaleaspidiformes
- Family: †Yongdongaspididae; Chen et al., 2022
- Genus: †Yongdongaspis; Chen et al., 2022
- Species: †Y. littoralis

Binomial name
- †Yongdongaspis littoralis Chen et al., 2022

Extinct genus of jawless vertebrates

Yongdongaspis, colloquially known as the Binhai Yongdong, is an extinct genus of galeaspid vertebrates within the monotypic family Yongdongaspididae. The type species is Y. littoralis and it was found in the Silurian-aged Huixingshao Formation of China. This makes it the oldest known fish fossil discovered in Chongqing to date.

== Discovery and naming ==
The holotype was excavated in July 2020 and was prepared in 2021, before being named as the new species Yongdongaspis littoralis in July 2022.

== Description ==
Based on the holotype, Yongdongaspis only grew to around 5 centimetres (2.0 in) long.
