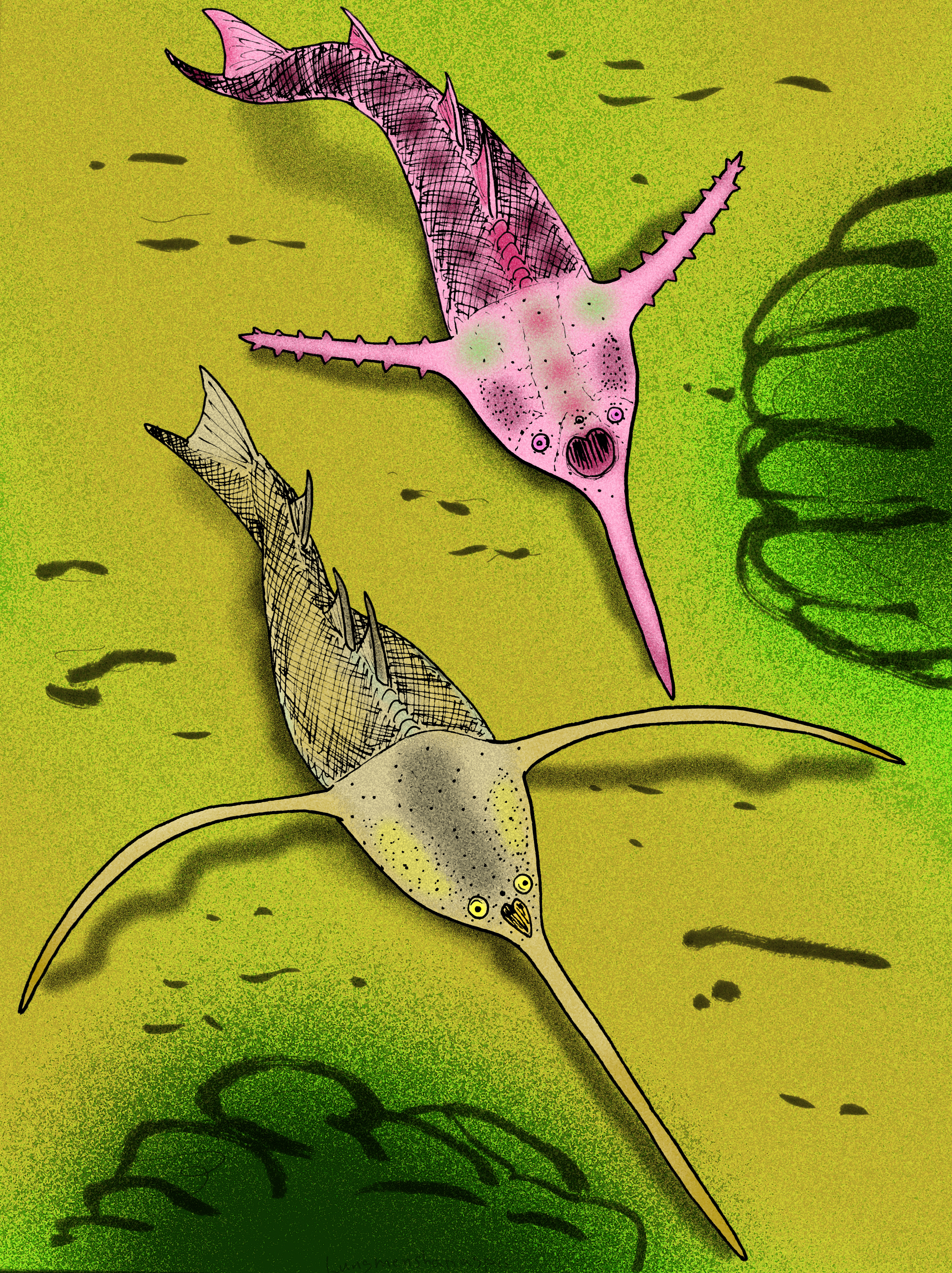
- Reconstruction of L. yunnanensis (top) and L. kiangyouensis (bottom)

Scientific classification
- Kingdom: Animalia
- Phylum: Chordata
- Infraphylum: Agnatha
- Class: †Galeaspida
- Order: †Huananaspidiformes
- Family: †Huananaspidae
- Subfamily: †Macrothyraspinae
- Genus: †Lungmenshanaspis; Pan & Wang, 1975

Type species
- †Lungmenshanaspis kiangyouensis Pan & Wang, 1975

Species
- Lungmenshanaspis kiangyouensis Pan & Wang, 1975; Lungmenshanaspis yunnanensis Wang et al., 1996

= Lungmenshanaspis =

Lungmenshanaspis Temporal range: Lochkovian

Genus of galeaspid vertebrates

Lungmenshanaspis is an extinct genus of galeaspid vertebrates. It lived during the Lochkovian stage in Sichuan, China.

== Description ==
Lungmenshanaspis was 15 cm (5.91 in) in length. A hole on its head probably helped it to breathe, similar to modern-day noses. It is best known for the long projections on the sides of its head, and its long rostrum.

== Classification ==
=== Relationships ===
Below is a cladogram of family Huananaspidae, where Lungmenshanaspis is shown in bold:

- Huananaspidae
  - - Asiaspis
    - - Nanpanaspis
      - Stephaspis
  - - Huananaspis
    - Macrothyraspinae
      - **Lungmenshanaspis**
      - - Qingmenaspis
        - - Sinoszechuanaspis
          - Macrothyraspis

=== Species ===
- Lungmenshanaspis kiangyouensis
- Lungmenshanaspis yunnanensis
