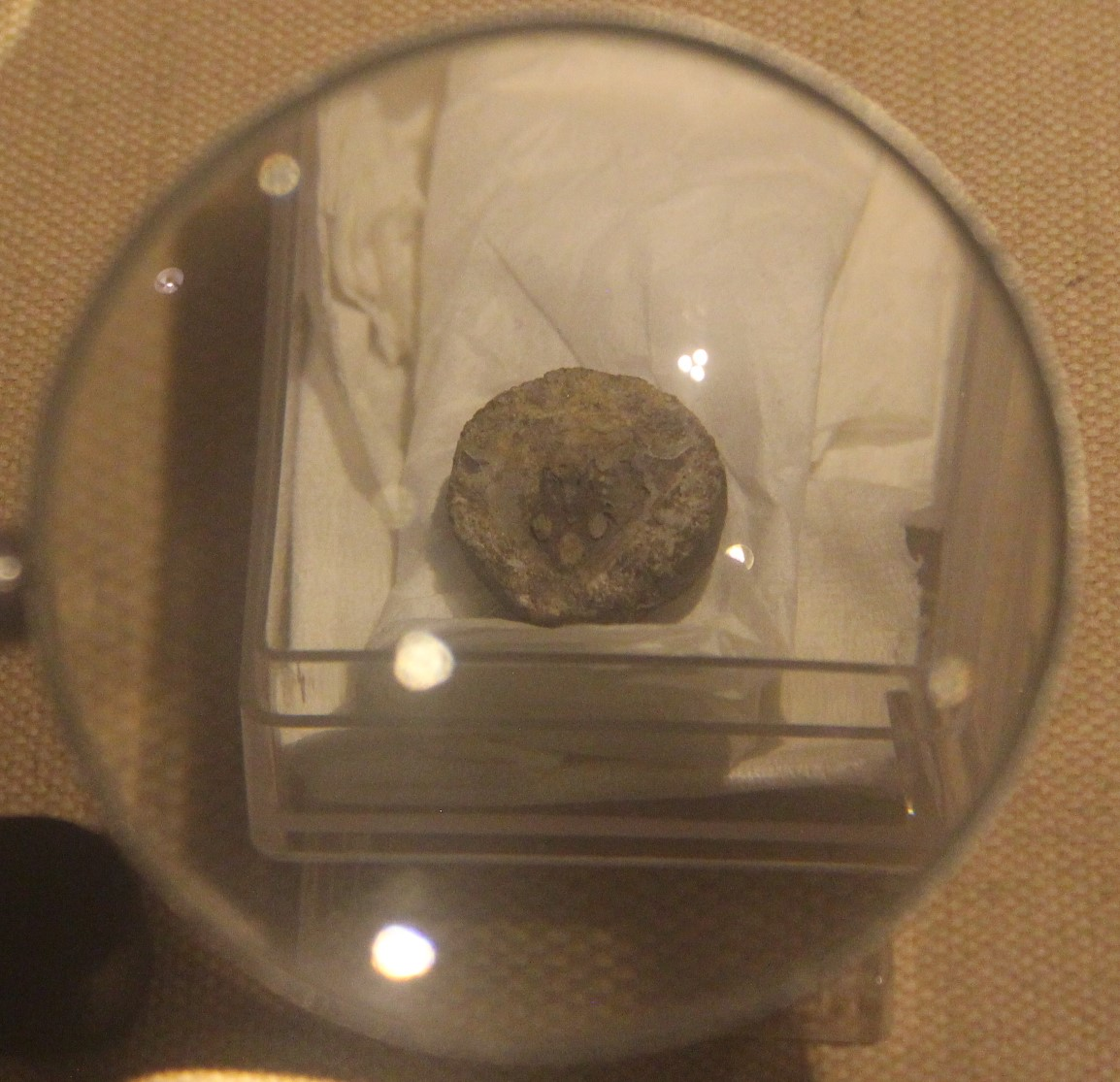
- Headshield (IVPP V14330.2a), Paleozoological Museum of China

Scientific classification
- Kingdom: Animalia
- Phylum: Chordata
- Infraphylum: Agnatha
- Class: †Galeaspida
- Order: †Eugaleaspidiformes
- Genus: †Shuyu; Gai et al., 2011

Species
- †S. zhejianensis (Pan, 1986 type)

Synonyms
- †Sinogaleaspis zhejianensis Pan, 1986

= Shuyu =

Shuyu Temporal range: 430–426.2 Ma

Extinct genus of jawless vertebrates

Shuyu is an extinct genus of early jawless vertebrate from the Early or Middle Silurian period (late Telychian to early Wenlock stages). It is the basalmost known eugaleaspidiform galeaspid and it lived in what is now northwestern Zhejiang Province, Southeast China. It is known from more than 20 headshields and at least 20 of them include three-dimensionally preserved neurocrania. The specimens of Shuyu were collected from the lower part of Maoshan Formation, located in Changxing District. Shuyu zhejianensis was first assigned by Pan, 1986 to a species of Sinogaleaspis. The genus was first named by Zhikun Gai, Philip C. J. Donoghue, Min Zhu, Philippe Janvier and Marco Stampanoni in 2011 and the type species is Shuyu zhejianensis.
