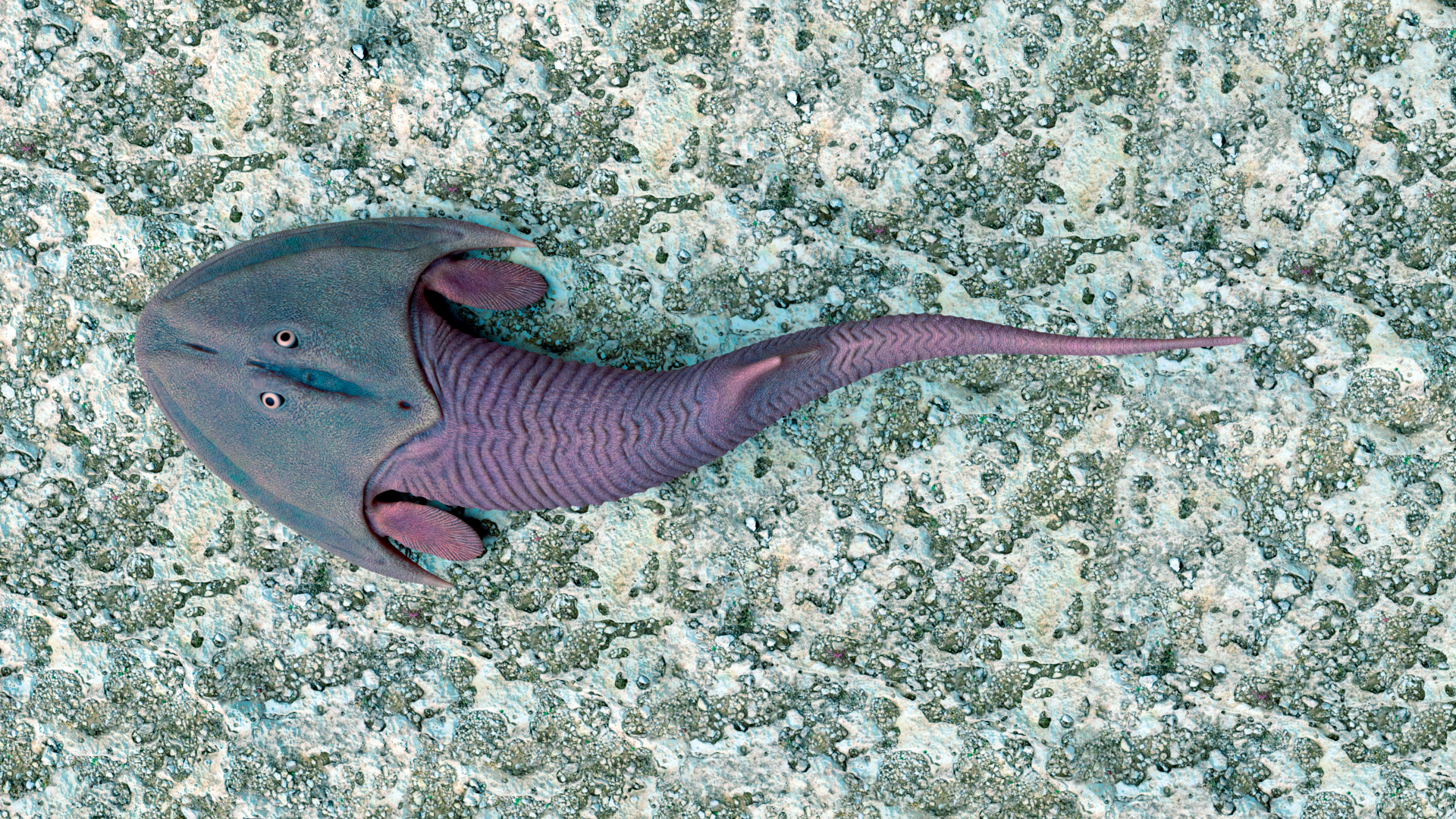
- Life restoration of Cephalaspis lyelli.

Scientific classification
- Kingdom: Animalia
- Phylum: Chordata
- Infraphylum: Agnatha
- Class: †Cephalaspidomorphi

Type species
- †Cephalaspis lyelli Agassiz, 1835

Subgroups
- †Cephalaspidiformes †Galeaspidiformes †Pituriaspidiformes; Gnathostomata?

= Cephalaspidomorphi =

Cephalaspidomorphs Temporal range: 438–359 Ma Cephalaspidomorphs may have survived to the present day if lampreys and/or gnathostomes are their descendants

Extinct class of jawless fishes

Cephalaspidomorphi (alternatively called Monorhina, or simply cephalaspids) is a class of jawless fishes uniting the osteostracans, galeaspids and pituriaspids. Most biologists regard this taxon as extinct, but the name is still sometimes used in the classification of lampreys because they were once thought to be descended. If lampreys are included they would extend the known range of the group from the Silurian and Devonian periods, when they are traditionally assumed to have lived, to the present day. Modern works typically assume the cephalaspidimorphs to be the closest relatives of jawed fishes, who may have emerged from within them; if this is true, they would survive if the jawed fish are included. The cephalaspidomorphs possessed armored head-shields, a heterocercal tail fin, and in some groups paired pectoral fins.

The monophyly of the group has been questioned, with suggestions that the scope of the group is paraphyletic.

== Biology and morphology ==
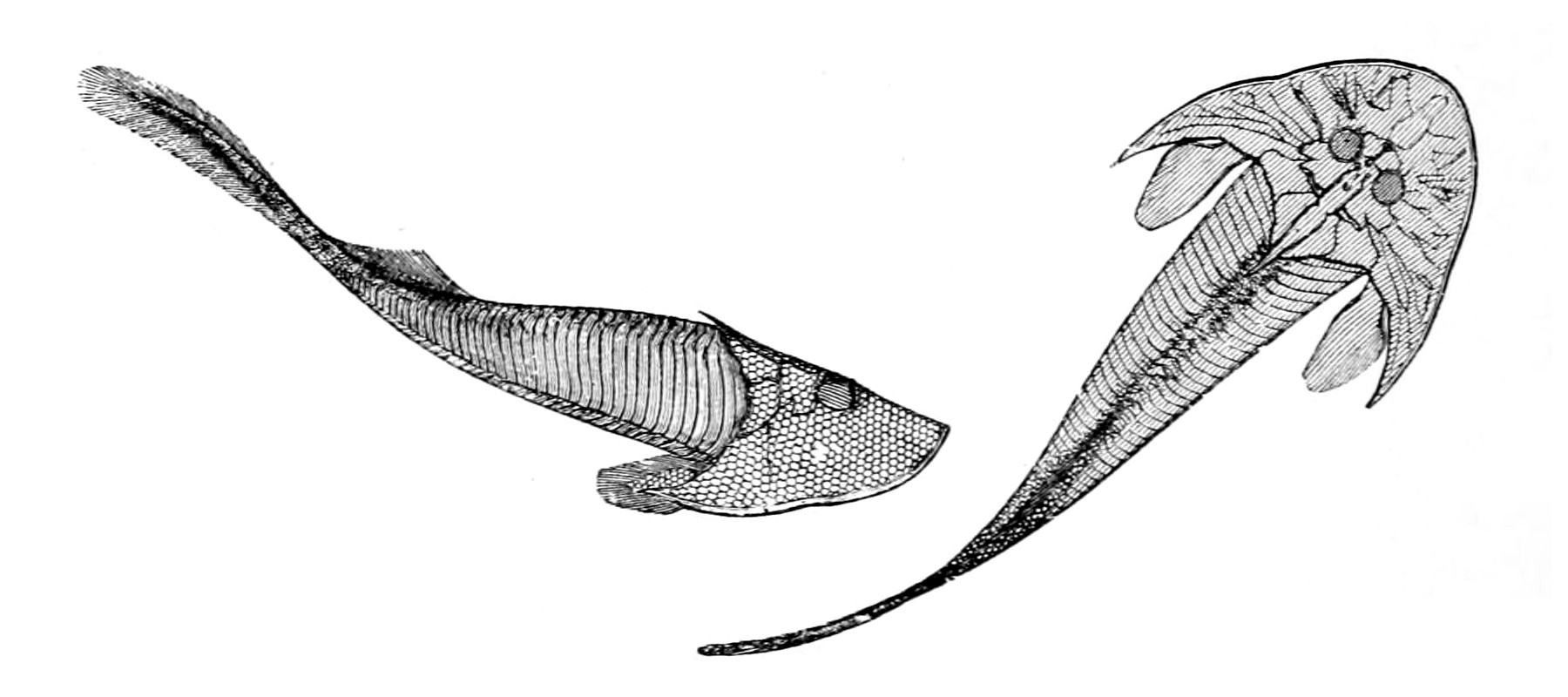
Reconstruction of Cephalaspis lyelli

Cephalaspidomorphs possessed armored plates on the exterior of their bodies. The head shield was particularly well developed, protecting the head, gills and the anterior section of the viscera. The body was in most forms well armored as well. The head shield had a series of grooves over the whole surface, forming an extensive lateral line organ. The eyes were rather small and placed on the top of the head. There was no jaw, and instead the mouth opening was surrounded by small plates, making the lips flexible, but without any ability to bite.

No internal skeleton is known, outside of the head shield. If they had a vertebral column at all, it would have been cartilage rather than bone. Likely, the axial skeleton consisted of an unsegmented notochord. A fleshy appendage emerged laterally on each side, behind the head shield, functioning as pectoral fins. The tail had a single, wrap-around tail-fin. Modern fishes with such a tail are rarely quick swimmers, and the Cephalaspidomorphs were not likely very active animals. They probably spent much of their time semi-submerged in the mud. They also lacked a swim bladder, and would not have been able to keep afloat without actively swimming. The head shield provided some lift though and would have made the Cephalaspidomorphs better swimmers than most of their contemporaries. The whole group were likely algae- or filter-feeders, combing the bottom for small animals, much like the modern armored bottom feeders, such as Loricariidae or Hoplosternum catfish.

== Classification ==
In the 1920s, the biologists Johan Kiær and Erik Stensiö first recognized the Cephalaspidomorphi as including the osteostracans, anaspids, and lampreys, because all three groups share a single dorsal "nostril", now known as a nasohypophysial opening.

Since then, opinions on the relations among jawless vertebrates have varied. Most workers have come to regard Agnatha as paraphyletic, having given rise to the jawed fishes. Because of shared features such as paired fins, the origins of the jawed vertebrates may lie close to Cephalaspidomorphi. Some biologists regard the name Cephalaspidomorphi as obsolete because relations among Osteostraci and Anaspida are unclear, and the relation of lampreys to these groups is no longer supported. Others, such as the authors behind Palaeos.com have restricted the cephalaspidomorphs to include only groups more clearly related to the Osteostraci, such as Galeaspida and potentially the Pituriaspida. Also following the latter definition, the class (and its monotypic superclass Osteostracomorphi) is assumed to be the monophyletic sister taxon to Gnathostomata by the 2016 edition of Fishes of the World.

A 2023 phylogenetic analysis of jawless fish found this grouping to be paraphyletic with respect to jawed fish.

== Lampreys ==
Some reference works and databases have regarded Cephalaspidomorphi as a Linnean class whose sole living representatives are the lampreys. Evidence now suggests that lampreys acquired the characters they share with cephalaspids by convergent evolution. As such, many newer works about fishes classify lampreys in a separate group called Petromyzontida or Hyperoartia.
