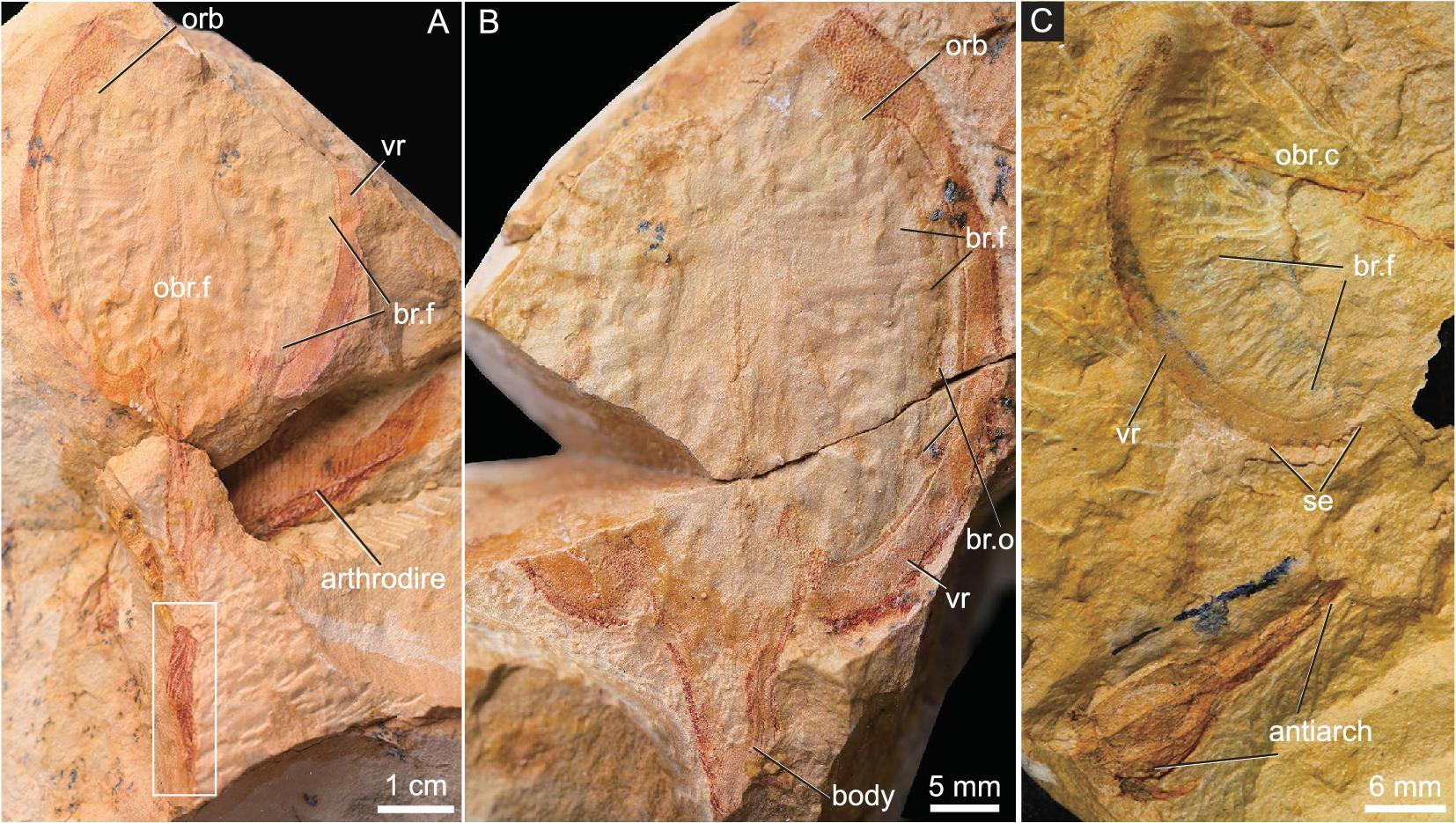
- Photographs of the holotype and paratype

Scientific classification
- Kingdom: Animalia
- Phylum: Chordata
- Infraphylum: Agnatha
- Class: †Cephalaspidomorphi
- Order: †Polybranchiaspidiformes
- Family: †Duyunolepididae
- Genus: †Foxaspis; Gai et al., 2023

Type species
- †Foxaspis novemura Gai et al., 2023

= Foxaspis =

Foxaspis Temporal range: Early Devonian (Pragian), 410 Ma

Extinct genus of Devonian jawless fish

Foxaspis (/fɒksˈæspɪs/, meaning "fox shield") is a genus of duyunolepidid galeaspid from the early Devonian (Pragian stage) Xiaoshan Formation in Guangxi, Southern China. The type and only species is F. novemura, known from two well-preserved specimens.

== Discovery and naming ==
Foxaspis is known from two specimens that were described in 2023 by Gai et al. The holotype, IVPP V30958.1a-b consists of a complete headshield articulated with a body and tail. The paratype, IVPP V30958.2-3, consists of an incomplete headshield and exceptionally preserved tail.

The generic name, Foxaspis, is derived from the English word "fox" and the Greek word "aspis", which roughly translates to "shield", meaning the generic name translates to "fox shield". The specific name, novemura, derives from the Latin words "novem", which translates to "nine," and the suffix "-ura" which refers to the tail, meaning the specific name translates to "nine tails". It was named as such after the nine-tailed fox, a mythical beast mentioned in the Shanhai jing.

== Description ==
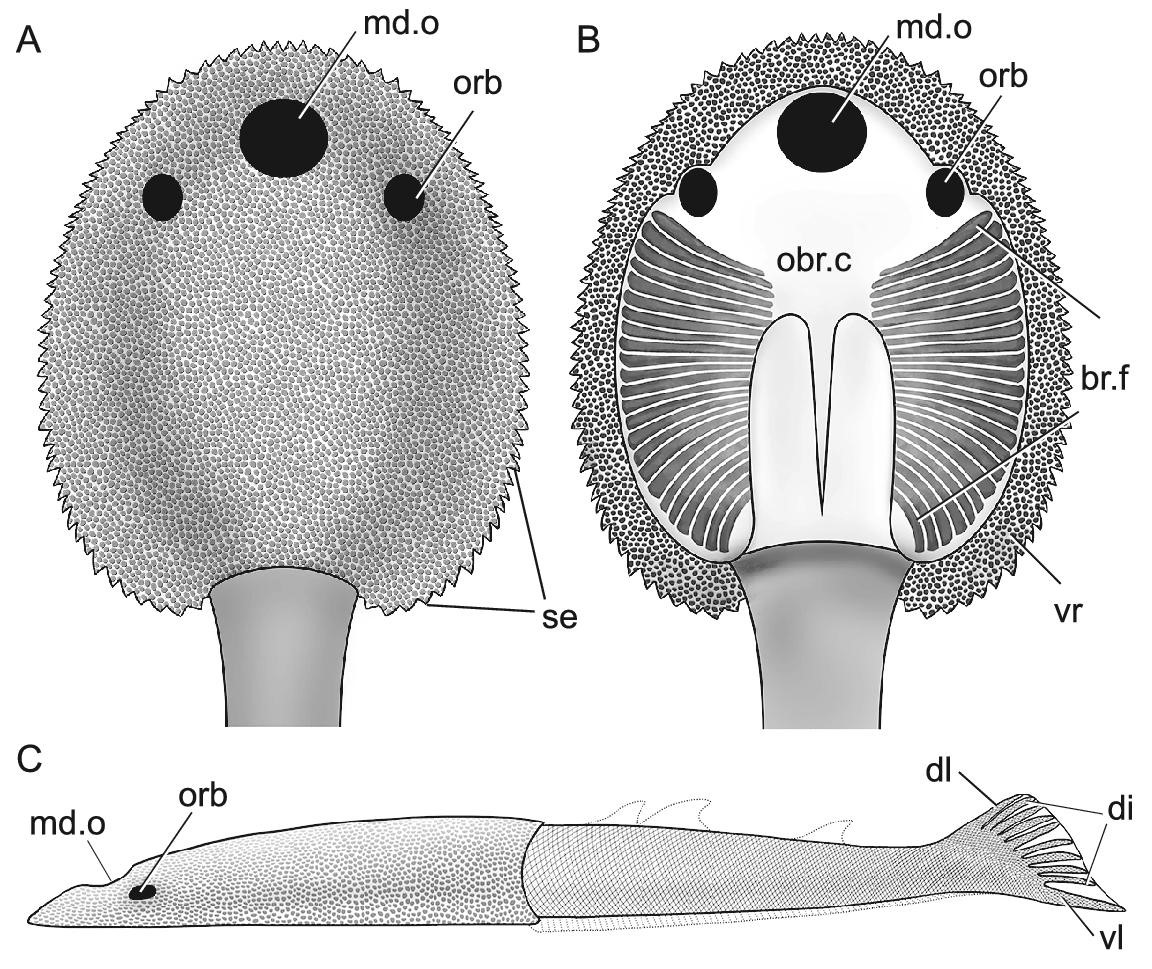
Reconstruction of Foxaspis

The tail of Foxaspis is notable, being asymmetrical with nine thin projections covered in scales. These spines may have been covered in a fin web. The tail of Tujiaaspis, a closely related galeaspid, lacked these structures and was generally symmetrical. Galeaspids like Foxaspis and Tujiaaspis were likely relatively fast swimmers compared to other contemporary jawless and jawed fish.
