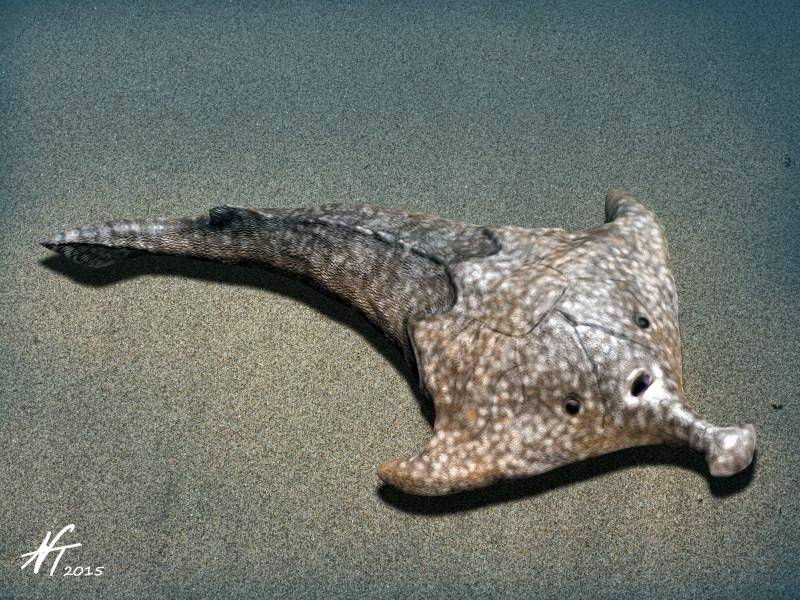

Scientific classification
- Kingdom: Animalia
- Phylum: Chordata
- Infraphylum: Agnatha
- Class: †Galeaspida
- Order: †Huananaspidiformes
- Family: †Sanchaspididae
- Genus: †Sanchaspis; Pan et Wang, 1981
- Species: †S. megalorostrata

Binomial name
- †Sanchaspis megalorostrata Pan et Wang, 1981

= Sanchaspis =

Sanchaspis Temporal range: Pragian, 410.8–407.6 Ma

Extinct galeaspid fish

Sanchaspis is an extinct genus of galeaspid jawless fish. It lived during the Pragian period of the Lower Devonian, in the Xujiachong Formation of what is now the province of Yunnan in China. The genus contains one species, S. megalorostrata, described in 1981.

== Description ==
The head shield of Sanchaspis was unusually shaped, featuring two flattened, backward-curving lateral extensions and an elongated forward protrusion that ended in a bulbous structure. Like all galeaspids, Sanchaspis had a dorsal opening on the top side of the head shield; this opening was elongated sideways across the head and was rather narrow. The animal's mouth was on the underside of its body. Sanchaspis is thought to have been a bottom-dwelling animal due to its dorsal opening and the placement of its mouth.

== Classification ==
Sanchaspis is the namesake of the family Sanchaspididae, which is part of the order Huananaspidiformes.
