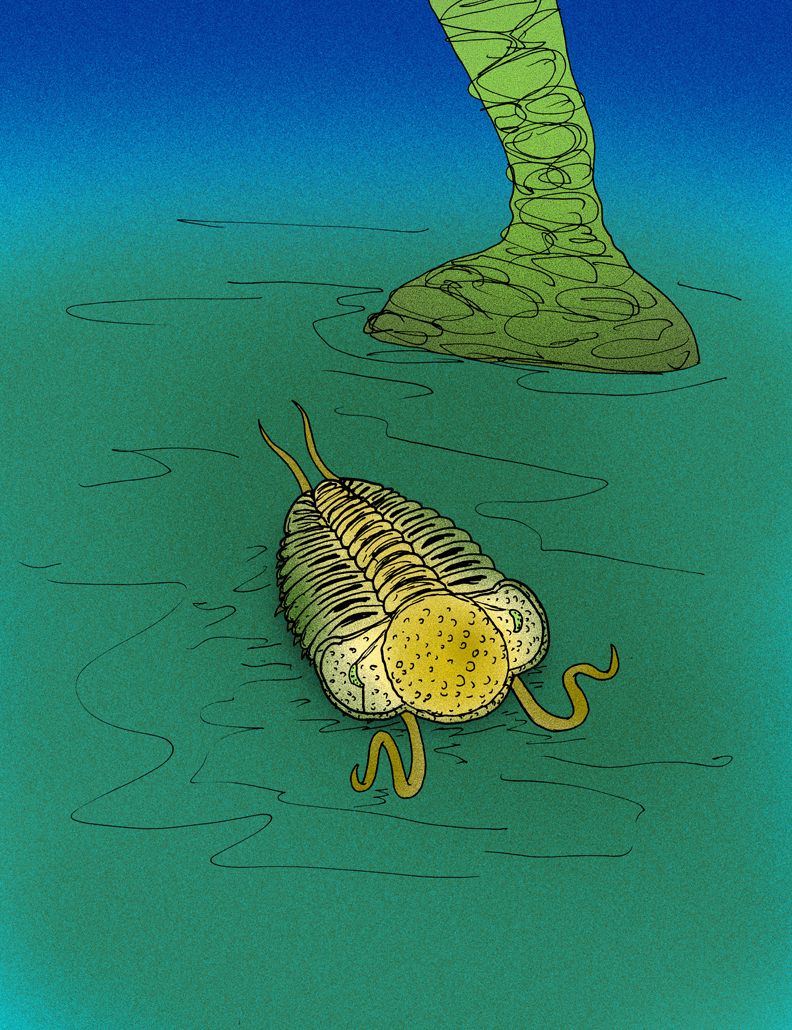
- Restoration of Galeaspis sphaerica

Scientific classification
- Kingdom: Animalia
- Phylum: Arthropoda
- Clade: †Artiopoda
- Class: †Trilobita
- Order: †Ptychopariida
- Family: †Catillicephalidae
- Genus: †Galeaspis; Ivshin, 1955

= Galeaspis =

Galeaspis Temporal range: Kuyandinian

Genus of trilobites

Galeaspis is an extinct genus of ptychopariid trilobite in the family Catillicephalidae. Species are found in the Seletinian Horizon of the Kuyandinian faunal stage of Late Cambrian marine strata in Central Kazakhstan. Fossil specimens are usually semicircular to bean-shaped, incomplete cranidia, with globular glabella (especially typified by the ball-shaped glabellum of the type species, G. sphaerica).
