= Min Zhu (paleontologist) =

Chinese paleontologist

- 朱敏
- Born: 3 October 1965 (age 60); Suzhou, Jiangsu, China
- Education: Nanjing University
- Occupation: Paleontologist
- Scientific career
- Fields: Vertebrate paleontology
- Workplaces: Institute of Vertebrate Paleontology and Paleoanthropology

Chinese name
- Simplified Chinese: 朱敏
- Traditional Chinese: 朱敏
Transcriptions
Standard Mandarin
- Hanyu Pinyin: Zhāng Mímàn

Min Zhu (Chinese: 朱敏; born October 1965), is a Chinese paleontologist at the Institute of Vertebrate Paleontology and Paleoanthropology (IVPP), a CAS Member. He completed his undergraduate studies at Nanjing University and completed his PhD thesis at IVPP. He is currently leading a research team from IVPP. The latest findings from his team are unearthed from two new fossil depositories, shedding light on the rise of jawed vertebrates

== Contributions ==
Guiyu oneiros

== Selected publications ==
- Zhu, M., Ahlberg, P.E., Zhao, W.-J. & Jia, L.-T. (2002): First Devonian tetrapod from Asia. Nature, 420, 760-761.
- Zhu, M. & Ahlberg, P.E. (2004): The origin of the internal nostril of tetrapods. Nature, 432, 94-97.
- Zhu, M., Yu, X.-B., Wang, W., Zhao, W.-J. & Jia, L.-T. (2006): A primitive fish provides key characters bearing on deep osteichthyan phylogeny. Nature, 441, 77-80.
- Zhu, M., Zhao, W.-J., Jia, L.-T., Lu, J., Qiao, T. and Qu, Q.-M. (2009): The oldest articulated osteichthyan reveals mosaic gnathostome characters. Nature, 458, 469-474.
