= Eugaleaspidiformes =

Eugaleaspidiformes Temporal range: Telychian–Lower Devonian

Scientific classification
- Kingdom: Animalia
- Phylum: Chordata
- Infraphylum: Agnatha
- Class: †Galeaspida
- Order: †Eugaleaspidiformes; Lui, 1965

Families and Genera
- Anjiaspis; Nochelaspis; Yunnanogaleaspis; Tujiaaspidae; Miaojiaaspis; Tujiaaspis; Shuyuidae; Jiangxialepis; Meishanaspis; Qingshuiaspis; Shuyu; Sinogaleaspidae; Rumporostralis; Sinogaleaspis; Yongdongaspidae; Yongdongaspis; Tridensaspidae; Falxcornus; Pterogonaspis; Tridensaspis; Eugaleaspididae; Dunyu; Eugaleaspis; Xitunaspis

Extinct order of jawless vertebrates

Eugaleaspidiformes (from Latin, "Helmet shield shapes") is an extinct order of jawless marine and freshwater fish, which lived in East Asia from the Telychian to the Lower Devonian period. The order was first named by Lui in 1965.

== Phylogeny ==
An analysis by Zhang and colleagues in 2026 obtained the following phylogenetic tree by strict consensus of 6 maximum parsimony trees:

- Eugaleaspidiformes
  - Tujiaaspidae
    - Miaojiaaspis
    - Tujiaaspis
  - Shuyuidae
    - Shuyu
    - Meishanaspis
    - - Qingshuiaspis
      - Jiangxialepis
  - - Anjiaspis
    - - Sinogaleaspidae
        - Sinogaleaspis
        - Rumporostralis
      - - Yongdongaspidae
          Yongdongaspis
        - - Yunnanogaleaspis
          - - Nochelaspis
            - - Tridensaspidae
                - Falxcornus
                - - Tridensaspis
                  - Pterogonaspis
              - Eugaleaspidae
                - Eugaleaspis
                - - Xitunaspis
                  - Dunyu
