= Mesotrichoca =

Scientific classification
- Kingdom: Animalia
- Phylum: Arthropoda
- Class: Insecta
- Order: Diptera
- Family: Cecidomyiidae
- Subfamily: Catotrichinae
- Genus: †Mesotrichoca; Jaschhof & Jaschhof, 2008

Type species
- Mesotrichoca mesozoica (Kovalev, 1990)

Genus of flies

Mesotrichoca is a genus of midges in the family Cecidomyiidae. The one described species in the genus - Mesotrichoca mesozoica - is known only from Siberia from a sediment fossil associated with the Late Jurassic and Lower Cretaceous epochs. This species was placed in Catotricha when it was first described by Russian entomologist Vladimir Grigoryevich Kovalev. This genus was established by Mathias Jaschhof and Catrin Jaschhof in 2008.
