= Anaretella =

Scientific classification
- Kingdom: Animalia
- Phylum: Arthropoda
- Clade: Pancrustacea
- Class: Insecta
- Order: Diptera
- Family: Cecidomyiidae
- Subfamily: Lestremiinae
- Genus: Anaretella; Enderlein, 1911

Type species
- Anaretella defecta (Winnertz, 1870)

Synonyms
- Neptunimyia Felt, 1912; Plocimas Enderlein, 1936; Cratotocha Plakidas, 2017

Genus of flies

Anaretella is a genus of midges in the family Cecidomyiidae. There are seven described species. The genus was established by German scientist Günther Enderlein in 1911 and has a cosmopolitan distribution.

== Species ==
- Anaretella acutissima Mamaev, 1998
- Anaretella ampliata (Plakidas, 2017)
- Anaretella defecta (Winnertz, 1870)
- Anaretella glacialis Mamaev & Økland, 1996
- Anaretella iola Pritchard, 1951
- Anaretella nitida (Edwards, 1928)
- Anaretella supermagna Mamaev & Økland, 1996
