= Buschingomyia =

Scientific classification
- Kingdom: Animalia
- Phylum: Arthropoda
- Class: Insecta
- Order: Diptera
- Family: Cecidomyiidae
- Subfamily: Lestremiinae
- Genus: Buschingomyia; Jaschhof & Jaschhof, 2011
- Species: B. harteni

Binomial name
- Buschingomyia harteni Jaschhof & Jaschhof, 2011

Genus of flies

Buschingomyia is a genus of midges in the family Cecidomyiidae. Buschingomyia harteni is the only described species in this genus and has only been recorded the United Arab Emirates.
