= Allarete =

Scientific classification
- Domain: Eukaryota
- Kingdom: Animalia
- Phylum: Arthropoda
- Class: Insecta
- Order: Diptera
- Family: Cecidomyiidae
- Subfamily: Lestremiinae
- Genus: Allarete; Pritchard, 1951

Type species
- Allarete vernalis (Felt, 1908)

Synonyms
- Allaretina Mamaev, 1994

Genus of flies

Allarete is a genus of midges in the family Cecidomyiidae. There are twelve described species in this genus. It is known from the holarctic, afrotropical, and oriental regions. The genus was first described by Arthur Earl Pritchard in 1951.

== Species ==
- Allarete africana Enderlein, 1911
- Allarete bharatica Grover & Bakhshi, 1978
- Allarete bhokarensis Deshpande, Shaikh & Sharma, 2002
- Allarete bicornuta Jaschhof, 1997
- Allarete deepica Deshpande, Shaikh & Sharma, 2002
- Allarete hindica (Deshpande, Shaikh & Sharma, 2002)
- Allarte indica (Grover, 1964)
- Allarete nigra Mamaev, 1994
- Allarete orientalis (Grover, 1964)
- Allarete spatuliformis Grover, 1979
- Allarete spinosa Deshpande, Shaikh & Sharma, 2002
- Allarete vernalis (Felt, 1908)
