= Trichotoca =

Scientific classification
- Kingdom: Animalia
- Phylum: Arthropoda
- Clade: Pancrustacea
- Class: Insecta
- Order: Diptera
- Family: Cecidomyiidae
- Subfamily: Catotrichinae
- Genus: Trichotoca; Jaschhof & Jaschhof, 2008

Type species
- Trichotoca edentula Jaschhof & Jaschhof, 2008

Genus of flies

Trichotoca is a genus of midges in the family Cecidomyiidae. There are two described species in this genus, both known only from Australia.

== Species ==
- Trichotoca edentula Jaschhof & Jaschhof, 2008
- Trichotoca fraterna (Jaschhof 2000)
