= Eomastix =

Scientific classification
- Kingdom: Animalia
- Phylum: Arthropoda
- Class: Insecta
- Order: Diptera
- Family: Cecidomyiidae
- Subfamily: Lestremiinae
- Genus: Eomastix; Jaschhof, 2009
- Species: E. incerta

Binomial name
- Eomastix incerta (Jaschhof, 2002)

Genus of flies

Eomastix is a genus of midges in the family Cecidomyiidae. Eomastix incerta is the only described species in this genus and is known from Norway and Sweden. The genus was established by Mathias Jaschhof in 2009.
