= Miastor =

Scientific classification
- Domain: Eukaryota
- Kingdom: Animalia
- Phylum: Arthropoda
- Class: Insecta
- Order: Diptera
- Family: Cecidomyiidae
- Subfamily: Winnertziinae
- Tribe: Heteropezini
- Genus: Miastor; Meinert, 1864

Genus of flies

Miastor is a genus of gall midges and wood midges in the family Cecidomyiidae. There are about seven described species in Miastor.

== Species ==
These seven species belong to the genus Miastor:

- Miastor agricolae Marshall, 1896
- Miastor castaneae Wyatt, 1967
- Miastor difficilis Marshall, 1896
- Miastor mastersi Skuse, 1888
- Miastor metraloas Meinert, 1864
- Miastor procax Skuse, 1888
- † Aprionus vlaskini (Fedotova & Perkovsky, 2007)
