= Wasmanniella =

Scientific classification
- Domain: Eukaryota
- Kingdom: Animalia
- Phylum: Arthropoda
- Class: Insecta
- Order: Diptera
- Family: Cecidomyiidae
- Subfamily: Lestremiinae
- Genus: Wasmanniella; Kieffer, 1898

Type species
- Wasmanniella aptera Kieffer, 1898

Genus of flies

Wasmanniella is a genus of midges in the family Cecidomyiidae. The three described species are known from the holarctic and oriental regions. The genus was established by French entomologist Jean-Jacques Kieffer in 1898.

== Species ==
- Wasmanniella aptera Kieffer, 1898
- Wasmanniella clauda Pritchard, 1951
- Wasmanniella indica Grover, 1970
