= Heteropeza pygmaea =

Scientific classification
- Domain: Eukaryota
- Kingdom: Animalia
- Phylum: Arthropoda
- Class: Insecta
- Order: Diptera
- Family: Cecidomyiidae
- Tribe: Heteropezini
- Genus: Heteropeza
- Species: H. pygmaea

Binomial name
- Heteropeza pygmaea Winnertz, 1846

Synonyms
- Oligarces noveboracensis Felt, 1907

Species of fly

Heteropeza pygmaea is a species of non-brachycera in the family Cecidomyiidae. It is found in Europe.
