= Gongromastix =

Scientific classification
- Kingdom: Animalia
- Phylum: Arthropoda
- Clade: Pancrustacea
- Class: Insecta
- Order: Diptera
- Family: Cecidomyiidae
- Subfamily: Lestremiinae
- Genus: Gongromastix; Enderlein, 1936

Type species
- Gongromastix angustipennis (Strobl, 1902)

Genus of flies

Gongromastix is a genus of midges in the family Cecidomyiidae. The five described species in this genus are known from the holarctic and oriental regions. It was established by Günther Enderlein in 1936.

== Species ==
- Gongromastix angustipennis (Strobl, 1902)
- Gongromastix elongata (Felt, 1908)
- Gongromastix ignigena Jaschhof, 2002
- Gongromastix indica (Rao & Adwant, 1975)
- Gongromastix orientalis (Rao & Adwant, 1975)
