= Mangogrostix =

Scientific classification
- Domain: Eukaryota
- Kingdom: Animalia
- Phylum: Arthropoda
- Class: Insecta
- Order: Diptera
- Family: Cecidomyiidae
- Subfamily: Lestremiinae
- Genus: Mangogrostix; Mamaev, 1985

Type species
- Mangogrostix orientalis (Gover, 1964)

Genus of flies

Mangogrostix is a genus of midges in the family Cecidomyiidae. There are two described species in this genus. It was established by Russian entomologist Boris Mamaev in 1985.

== Species ==
- Mangogrostix bharatae (Sharma & Rao, 1979)
- Mangogrostix orientalis (Grover, 1964)
