= Trichoceromyia =

Scientific classification
- Kingdom: Animalia
- Phylum: Arthropoda
- Class: Insecta
- Order: Diptera
- Family: Cecidomyiidae
- Subfamily: Catotrichinae
- Genus: Trichoceromyia; Jaschhof & Fitzgerald, 2016

Type species
- Trichoceromyia oregonensis Jaschhof & Fitzgerald, 2016

Genus of flies

Trichoceromyia is a genus of midges in the family Cecidomyiidae. There is one described species in this genus: Trichoceromyia oregonensis. It is only known from Oregon.
