= Neolestremia =

Scientific classification
- Domain: Eukaryota
- Kingdom: Animalia
- Phylum: Arthropoda
- Class: Insecta
- Order: Diptera
- Family: Cecidomyiidae
- Subfamily: Lestremiinae
- Genus: Neolestremia; Mani, 1934

Type species
- Neolestremia boerhaaviae Mani, 1934

Genus of flies

Neolestremia is a genus of midges in the family Cecidomyiidae. The three described species in this genus are known only from India. It was established by Indian entomologist Mahadeva Subramania Mani in 1934.

== Species ==
- Neolestremia boerhaaviae Mani, 1934
- Neolestremia longipalpa Deshpande, Shaikh & Sharma, 2002
- Neolestremia orientalis Sharma & Rao, 1979
