= Anarete =

Scientific classification
- Domain: Eukaryota
- Kingdom: Animalia
- Phylum: Arthropoda
- Class: Insecta
- Order: Diptera
- Family: Cecidomyiidae
- Subfamily: Lestremiinae
- Genus: Anarete; Haliday, 1833

Type species
- Anarete candidata Haliday, 1833

Synonyms
- Pseudanarete Kieffer, 1906; Microcerata Felt, 1908; Limnopneumella Enderlein, 1911

Genus of flies

Anarete is a genus of midges in the family Cecidomyiidae. There are 38 described species. The genus was established by Irish entomologist Alexander Henry Haliday in 1833 and has a cosmopolitan distribution.

== Species ==
- Anarete albipennis Loew, 1845
- Anarete allahabadensis Grover, 1964
- Anarete anepsia Pritchard, 1951
- Anarete angusta Mo & Xu, 2009
- Anarete basmatensis Bhalerao, Shaikh & Deshpande, 2009
- Anarete bharati Bhalerao, Shaikh & Deshpande, 2009
- Anarete bipartita Jaschhof & Jaschhof, 2011
- Anarete buscki (Felt, 1915)
- Anarete candidata Haliday, 1833
- Anarete conaretoides Jaschhof & Jaschhof, 2011
- Anarete corni (Felt, 1907)
- Anarete cornoata Mamaev, 1964
- Anarete diervillae (Felt, 1907)
- Anarete edwardsi Pritchard, 1951
- Anarete felti Pritchard, 1951
- Anarete flavitarsis Mamaev, 1964
- Anarete iridis (Cockerell, 1914)
- Anarete jagdyevi Mamaev, 1986
- Anarete johnsoni (Felt, 1908)
- Anarete lacteipennis Kieffer, 1906
- Anarete longipalpi Bhalerao, Shaikh & Deshpande, 2009
- Anarete mamajevi Berest, 1987
- Anarete manii Rao, 1953
- Anarete medicaginis Mamaev, 1963
- Anarete pallida Edwards, 1928
- Anarete perplexia Gagne, 2004
- Anarete pilipennis Strobl, 1910
- Anarete pritchardi Kim, 1967
- Anarete rubra Kieffer, 1906
- Anarete serena Berest, 2000
- Anarete sitapurensis Grover, 1970
- Anarete stettinensis Enderlein, 1911
- Anarete taimyrensis Mamaev, 1990
- Anarete tashanensis Mo & Xiao, 2004
- Anarete triarthra Edwards, 1938
- Anarete trilobata Najam, Siddique & Deshpande, 2008
- Anarete vishnupurensis Najam, Siddique & Deshpande, 2008
- Anarete zhengi B & Li, 2001
