= Allaretella =

Scientific classification
- Kingdom: Animalia
- Phylum: Arthropoda
- Class: Insecta
- Order: Diptera
- Family: Cecidomyiidae
- Subfamily: Lestremiinae
- Genus: Allaretella; Meyer & Spungis, 1994
- Species: A. germanica

Binomial name
- Allaretella germanica Meyer & Spungis, 1994

Genus of flies

Allaretella is a genus of midges in the family Cecidomyiidae. Allartella germanica is the only described species in this genus. It has been recorded in Sweden, Latvia, Germany, and Austria. The genus was first described by Hans Meyer and Voldemars Spungis in 1994.
