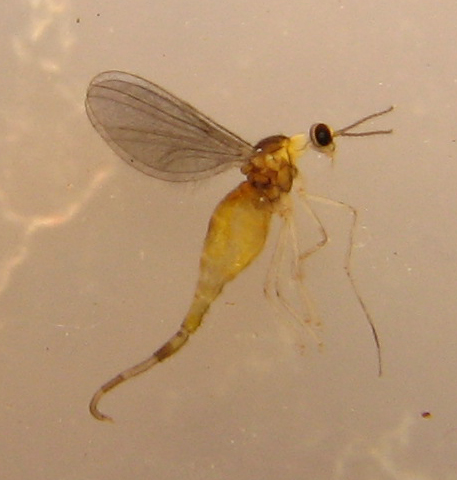

Scientific classification
- Domain: Eukaryota
- Kingdom: Animalia
- Phylum: Arthropoda
- Class: Insecta
- Order: Diptera
- Family: Cecidomyiidae
- Subfamily: Winnertziinae

= Winnertziinae =

Winnertziinae Temporal range: Barremian–Recent

Subfamily of flies

Winnertziinae is a subfamily of gall midges and wood midges in the family Cecidomyiidae.

== Genera ==
These genera belong to the subfamily Winnertziinae.

Data sources: i = ITIS, c = Catalogue of Life, g = GBIF, b = Bugguide.net

=== Genera ===
- Tribe Diallactiini Rubsaamen and Hedicke 1926
  - †Cretohaplusia Arillo and Nel 2000 Spanish amber, Albian
  - Diallactia Gagné 2004
  - Ferovisenda Mamaev 1972
  - †Ganseriella Fedotova and Perkovsky 2017 Burmese amber, Myanmar, Cenomanian
  - Gynapteromyia Mamaev 1965
  - Haplusia Karsch, 1877^{i c g b}
  - †Palaeocolpodia Meunier 1904 (nomen dubium) Baltic amber, Eocene
  - Sylvenomyia Mamaev & Zaitzev 1998
  - Wyattella Mamaev 1966
- Tribe Heteropezini
  - Brittenia Edwards 1941
  - †Cretomiastor Gagné 1977 Canadian amber, Campanian
  - †Electroxylomyia Nel and Prokop 2006 Oise amber, France, Ypresian
  - †Estoperpetua Fedotova and Perkovsky 2016 Sakhalin amber, Russia, Lutetian
  - Frirenia Kieffer 1894
  - Henria Wyatt 1959
  - Heteropeza Winnertz, 1846^{i c g b}
  - Leptosyna Kieffer, 1894^{c g b}
  - Miastor Meinert, 1864^{i c g b}
  - †Monodicrana Loew 1850 Baltic amber, Eocene
  - Neostenoptera Meunier, 1902^{c g b}
  - Nikandria Mamaev 1964
  - †Rasnitsia Fedotova and Perkovsky 2009 Rovno amber, Ukraine, Eocene
  - †Stellasegna Fedotova and Perkovsky 2009 Rovno amber, Ukraine, Eocene
  - †Tutkowskia Fedotova and Perkovsky 2008 Rovno amber, Ukraine, Eocene
  - †Ventosagloria Fedotova and Perkovsky 2008 Rovno amber, Ukraine, Eocene
  - †Vincinescia Fedotova and Perkovsky 2009 Rovno amber, Ukraine, Eocene
- Tribe Winnertziini
  - Clinorhytis Kieffer 1896
  - †Cretowinnertzia Gagné 1977 Canadian amber, Campanian
  - Ekmanomyia Jaschhof 2013
  - Kronomyia Felt 1911
  - †Lebanowinnertzia Azar and Nel, 2020 Lebanese amber, Barremian
  - †Libanoclinorrhytis Azar and Nel, 2020 Lebanese amber, Barremian
  - Parwinnertzia Felt 1920
  - Rhipidoxylomyia Mamaev 1964
  - Winnertzia Rondani, 1861^{i c g b}
- Incertae sedis
  - Fertepidosis Fedotova & Sidorenko 2007
  - Vasiliola Fedotova 2004
