= Winnertzia solidaginis =

Scientific classification
- Domain: Eukaryota
- Kingdom: Animalia
- Phylum: Arthropoda
- Class: Insecta
- Order: Diptera
- Family: Cecidomyiidae
- Genus: Winnertzia
- Species: W. solidaginis

Binomial name
- Winnertzia solidaginis Felt, 1907

Synonyms
- Winnertzia aceris Felt, 1913; Winnertzia calciequina Felt, 1907; Winnertzia pectinata Felt, 1911

Species of fly

Winnertzia solidaginis is a species of non-brachycera in the family Cecidomyiidae. It is found in Europe.
