= Orseolia =

Scientific classification
- Domain: Eukaryota
- Kingdom: Animalia
- Phylum: Arthropoda
- Class: Insecta
- Order: Diptera
- Family: Cecidomyiidae
- Supertribe: Cecidomyiidi
- Genus: Orseolia; Kieffer & Massalongo, 1902

Genus of flies

Orseolia is a genus of flies belonging to the family Cecidomyiidae.

The species of this genus are found in Southeastern Asia and Northern America.

Species:

- Orseolia andropogonis (Felt, 1917)
- Orseolia apludae (Felt, 1920)
- Orseolia bengalensis (Mani, 1937)
- Orseolia bonzii Harris, 2000
- Orseolia caulicola Gagne, 1973
- Orseolia ceylanica (Kieffer, 1912)
- Orseolia ceylonica (Kieffer, 1912)
- Orseolia cornea (Felt, 1917)
- Orseolia cynodontis Kieffer & Massalongo, 1902
- Orseolia difficilis Gagne, 1973
- Orseolia fluvialis (Felt, 1917)
- Orseolia graminicola (Kieffer & Leeuwen-Reijnvaan, 1910)
- Orseolia graminis (Kieffer & Leeuwen-Reijnvaan, 1910)
- Orseolia indica (Felt, 1921)
- Orseolia ischaemi (Kieffer, 1910)
- Orseolia javanica Kieffer & Leeuwen-Reijnvaan, 1910
- Orseolia lourdusamyi Mani, 1986
- Orseolia miscanthi (Shinji, 1938)
- Orseolia mnesitheae Gagne, 1985
- Orseolia monticola (Felt, 1921)
- Orseolia nwanzei Harris & Nwilene, 2006
- Orseolia orientalis (Felt, 1921)
- Orseolia oryzae (Wood-Mason, 1889)
- Orseolia oryzivora Harris & Gagne, 1982
- Orseolia paspali (Felt, 1921)
- Orseolia paspalumi (Mani, 1936)
- Orseolia polliniae (Felt, 1927)
- Orseolia sallae Gagne, 1973
- Orseolia similis Gagne, 1973
