= Conarete =

Scientific classification
- Domain: Eukaryota
- Kingdom: Animalia
- Phylum: Arthropoda
- Class: Insecta
- Order: Diptera
- Family: Cecidomyiidae
- Subfamily: Lestremiinae
- Genus: Conarete; Pritchard, 1951

Type species
- Conarete crebra Pritchard, 1951

Genus of flies

Conarete is a genus of midges in the family Cecidomyiidae. There are 13 described species in this genus. It was established by Arthur Earl Pritchard in 1951.

== Species ==
- Conarete brevipalpa Li & Bu, 2002
- Conarete calcuttaensis (Nayar, 1949)
- Conarete crebra Pritchard, 1951
- Conarete deepica Deshpande, 1983
- Conarete eluta Pritchard, 1951
- Conarete eschata Pritchard, 1951
- Conarete indica (Mani, 1934)
- Conarete indorensis Grover, 1970
- Conarete mihijamensis Grover, 1964
- Conarete orientalis Rao, 1956
- Conarete sicyoidea Li & Bu, 2002
- Conarete texana (Felt, 1913)
- Conarete triangularis Shaikh, Siddiqui, Najam, Sanap & Deshpande, 2011
