= Heteropeza =

Scientific classification
- Domain: Eukaryota
- Kingdom: Animalia
- Phylum: Arthropoda
- Class: Insecta
- Order: Diptera
- Family: Cecidomyiidae
- Subfamily: Winnertziinae
- Tribe: Heteropezini
- Genus: Heteropeza; Winnertz, 1846

Genus of flies

Heteropeza is a genus of gall midges and wood midges in the family Cecidomyiidae. There are about six described species in Heteropeza.

== Species ==
These six species belong to the genus Heteropeza:

- Heteropeza cathistes Pritchard
- Heteropeza pygmaea Winnertz, 1846
- Heteropeza transmarina Schiner, 1868
- Heteropeza ulmi (Felt, 1911)
- † Heteropeza marikovskii (Fedotova & Perkovsky, 2008)
- † Heteropeza pulchella Meunier, 1904
