= Wheeleriola =

Scientific classification
- Kingdom: Animalia
- Phylum: Arthropoda
- Class: Insecta
- Order: Diptera
- Family: Cecidomyiidae
- Subfamily: Catotrichinae
- Genus: Wheeleriola; Jaschhof & Jaschhof, 2020

Type species
- Wheeleriola perplexa Jaschhof & Jaschhof, 2020

Genus of flies

Wheeleriola is a genus of midges in the family Cecidomyiidae. The one described species in this genus - Wheeleriola perplexa - is known only from New Zealand.
