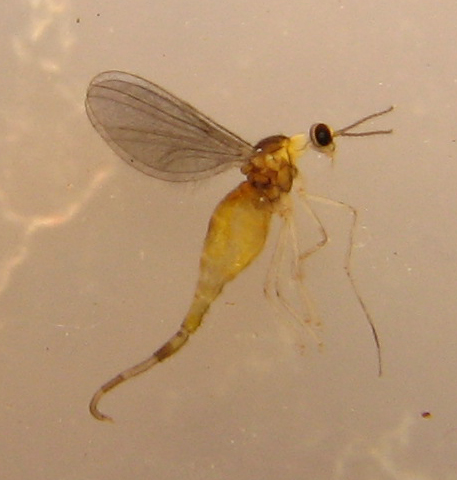

Scientific classification
- Domain: Eukaryota
- Kingdom: Animalia
- Phylum: Arthropoda
- Class: Insecta
- Order: Diptera
- Family: Cecidomyiidae
- Subfamily: Winnertziinae
- Genus: Winnertzia; Rondani, 1861

= Winnertzia =

Winnertzia Temporal range: Cenomanian–Recent

Genus of flies

Winnertzia is a genus of gall midges and wood midges in the family Cecidomyiidae. There are more than 90 described species in Winnertzia.

== Species ==
These 97 species belong to the genus Winnertzia:

- Winnertzia amoena Mamaev, 2006
- Winnertzia ampelophila (Felt, 1907)
- Winnertzia anomala Kieffer, 1896
- Winnertzia argentata Mamaev, 1964
- Winnertzia arizoniensis Felt, 1908
- Winnertzia asiatica Mamaev, 1963
- Winnertzia assimilata Mamaev, 1972
- Winnertzia betulicola Mamaev, 1963
- Winnertzia brachypalpa Mamaev, 1975
- Winnertzia brevipalpata Jaschhof, 2013
- Winnertzia brevis Mamaev, 2002
- Winnertzia bulbifera Mamaev, 1963
- Winnertzia cactophila (Samuelson, 1964)
- Winnertzia carpini Felt, 1907
- Winnertzia carpinicola Kieffer, 1913
- Winnertzia centralis Mamaev, 2001
- Winnertzia citrina (Kieffer, 1888)
- Winnertzia colubrifera Mamaev, 1975
- Winnertzia conorum Kieffer, 1920
- Winnertzia cornigera Mamaev, 2002
- Winnertzia corticis Kieffer, 1913
- Winnertzia curvata Panelius, 1965
- Winnertzia deserticola Mamaev, 1963
- Winnertzia detrita Mamaev, 1975
- Winnertzia discreta Mohrig & Mamaev, 1970
- Winnertzia discretella Spungis, 1992
- Winnertzia dispar Mamaev, 2002
- Winnertzia divergens Mamaev, 2002
- Winnertzia diversicornis Mamaev, 2006
- Winnertzia equestris Mamaev, 1963
- Winnertzia feralis Mamaev, 2002
- Winnertzia fungicola Felt, 1921
- Winnertzia fusca Kieffer, 1901
- Winnertzia globifera Mamaev, 1963
- Winnertzia graduata Spungis, 1992
- Winnertzia griseipennis (Loew, 1874)
- Winnertzia hikosanensis Yukawa, 1967
- Winnertzia hudsonici Felt, 1908
- Winnertzia indica Grover, 1971
- Winnertzia invisibilis Mamaev, 2001
- Winnertzia iridis Mamaev, 2002
- Winnertzia levicollis Kieffer, 1901
- Winnertzia longiptera Mamaev, 2002
- Winnertzia lugubris (Winnertz, 1853)
- Winnertzia maacki Mamaev, 1975
- Winnertzia mahensis (Kieffer, 1911)
- Winnertzia monarthra Mamaev, 1990
- Winnertzia mycetaula Mamaev, 2002
- Winnertzia nigra Mamaev, 1963
- Winnertzia nigricolor Mamaev, 2002
- Winnertzia nigripennis Kieffer, 1896
- Winnertzia obscura Kieffer, 1894
- Winnertzia obscuricornis Mamaev, 2001
- Winnertzia orientalis Grover, 1971
- Winnertzia padicola Spungis, 1992
- Winnertzia palpina Mamaev, 2006
- Winnertzia palustris Felt, 1915
- Winnertzia parvispina Jaschhof, 2013
- Winnertzia pectinulata Mamaev, 1975
- Winnertzia peramoena Mamaev, 2006
- Winnertzia photophila Jaiswal, 2005
- Winnertzia pictipes (Kieffer, 1896)
- Winnertzia pinicola Kieffer, 1913
- Winnertzia pinicorticis Felt, 1907
- Winnertzia plastica Fedotova & Sidorenko, 2005
- Winnertzia populicola Spungis, 1992
- Winnertzia pravdini Mamaeva & Mamaev, 1971
- Winnertzia proxima Kieffer, 1894
- Winnertzia quercicola Kieffer, 1913
- Winnertzia regia Mamaev, 2002
- Winnertzia rotundata Spungis, 1992
- Winnertzia rubida Felt, 1908
- Winnertzia rubra Kieffer, 1894
- Winnertzia rubricola Mamaev, 1963
- Winnertzia salicis (Bouché, 1834)
- Winnertzia sequentis Mamaev, 2001
- Winnertzia solidaginis Felt, 1907
- Winnertzia striaticollis Kieffer, 1901
- Winnertzia subglobifera Mamaev, 2006
- Winnertzia sublongiptera Mamaev, 2002
- Winnertzia tamariciphila Mamaev, 1963
- Winnertzia tarsata Mamaev, 2002
- Winnertzia tenella (Walker, 1856)
- Winnertzia triangulifera Mamaev, 2001
- Winnertzia tridens Panelius, 1965
- Winnertzia tumida Panelius, 1965
- Winnertzia ussurica Mamaev, 1975
- Winnertzia vexans (Kieffer, 1913)
- † Winnertzia affinis Meunier, 1904
- † Winnertzia bellata Fedotova, 2005
- † Winnertzia cylindrica Meunier, 1904
- † Winnertzia isotoma Fedotova, 2005
- † Winnertzia kapustini Fedotova & Perkovsky, 2008
- † Winnertzia radiata Meunier, 1904
- † Winnertzia recusata Fedotova & Perkovsky, 2008
- † Winnertzia separata Meunier, 1904
- † Winnertziola burmitica (Cockerell, 1917) Burmese amber, Myanmar, Cenomanian
