= Haplusia rubra =

Scientific classification
- Domain: Eukaryota
- Kingdom: Animalia
- Phylum: Arthropoda
- Class: Insecta
- Order: Diptera
- Family: Cecidomyiidae
- Genus: Haplusia
- Species: H. rubra

Binomial name
- Haplusia rubra (Felt, 1908)

Synonyms
- Johnsonomyia rubra Felt, 1908

Species of fly

Haplusia rubra is a species of fly in the family Cecidomyiidae.
