= Catotricha americana =

Scientific classification
- Kingdom: Animalia
- Phylum: Arthropoda
- Class: Insecta
- Order: Diptera
- Family: Cecidomyiidae
- Genus: Catotricha
- Species: C. americana

Binomial name
- Catotricha americana (Felt, 1908)

Synonyms
- Catocha americana Felt, 1908

Species of fly

Catotricha americana is a species of basal gall midges in the family Cecidomyiidae. It is the type species of the genus and has only been confirmed to occur in New Hampshire. This species was first described by American entomologist Ephraim Porter Felt in 1908.
