= Insulestremia =

Scientific classification
- Kingdom: Animalia
- Phylum: Arthropoda
- Class: Insecta
- Order: Diptera
- Family: Cecidomyiidae
- Subfamily: Lestremiinae
- Genus: Insulestremia; Jaschhof, 2004
- Species: I. sinclairi

Binomial name
- Insulestremia sinclairi Jaschhof, 2004

Genus of flies

Insulestremia is a genus of midges in the family Cecidomyiidae. There is only one described species in this genus, Insulestremia sinclairi, which is known only from the Galapagos Islands. It was established by Mathias Jaschhof in 2004.
