= Catotrichinae =

Scientific classification
- Domain: Eukaryota
- Kingdom: Animalia
- Phylum: Arthropoda
- Class: Insecta
- Order: Diptera
- Family: Cecidomyiidae
- Subfamily: Catotrichinae; Edwards, 1938

Genera
- Catotricha; Trichoceromyia; Trichotoca; Wheeleriola; Mesotrichoca

Subfamily of flies

Catotrichinae is a subfamily of Cecidomyiidae. Members of this subfamily were formerly included in Lestremiinae and are considered the most primitive members Cecidomyiidae. The larvae feed on fungi. Five genera are currently recognized.

== Genera ==
- Catotricha Edwards, 1938
- †Mesotrichoca Jaschhof & Jaschhof, 2008
- Trichoceromyia Jaschhof & Fitzgerald, 2016
- Trichotoca Jaschhof & Jaschhof, 2008
- Wheeleriola Jaschhof & Jaschhof, 2020
