= Miastor metraloas =

Scientific classification
- Domain: Eukaryota
- Kingdom: Animalia
- Phylum: Arthropoda
- Class: Insecta
- Order: Diptera
- Family: Cecidomyiidae
- Tribe: Heteropezini
- Genus: Miastor
- Species: M. metraloas

Binomial name
- Miastor metraloas Meinert, 1864

Synonyms
- Miastor americana Felt, 1907

Species of fly

Miastor metraloas is a species of midges in the family Cecidomyiidae.
