= Catotricha =

Scientific classification
- Domain: Eukaryota
- Kingdom: Animalia
- Phylum: Arthropoda
- Class: Insecta
- Order: Diptera
- Family: Cecidomyiidae
- Subfamily: Catotrichinae
- Genus: Catotricha; Edwards, 1938

Type species
- Catotricha americana (Felt, 1908)

Genus of flies

Catotricha is a genus of midges in the family Cecidomyiidae. The five described species in Catotricha are found in the holarctic region. This genus was established by British entomologist Frederick Wallace Edwards in 1938. with Catocha americana Felt, 1908 from Northeastern USA and Canada as the type species.

== Species ==
These five species belong to the genus Catotricha:

- Catotricha americana (Felt, 1908)
- Catotricha marinae Mamaev, 1985
- Catotricha nipponensis (Alexander 1924)
- Catotricha subobsoleta (Alexander, 1924)
- Catotricha subterranea Mamaev, 1985
