= Lestremia =

Scientific classification
- Domain: Eukaryota
- Kingdom: Animalia
- Phylum: Arthropoda
- Class: Insecta
- Order: Diptera
- Family: Cecidomyiidae
- Subfamily: Lestremiinae
- Genus: Lestremia; Macquart, 1826

Type species
- Lestremia cinerea Macquart, 1826

Synonyms
- Cecidogona Loew, 1844; Lesremya Rondani, 1856; Lestremina Shinji, 1944; Lestremyia Shinji, 1944

Genus of flies

Lestremia is a genus of midges in the family Cecidomyiidae. There are 18 described species in this genus. It was established by French entomologist Pierre-Justin-Marie Macquart in 1826.

== Species ==
- Lestremia allahabadensis Grover, 1970
- Lestremia calcuttaensis Mani, 1937
- Lestremia ceylandica Kieffer, 1912
- Lestremia cinerea Macquart, 1826
- Lestremia clivicola Hardy, 1960
- Lestremia deepica Sharma & Rao, 1980
- Lestremia deploegi Nel & Prokop, 2006
- Lestremia eocenica Nel & Prokop, 2006
- Lestremia indica Kieffer, 1909
- Lestremia leucophaea (Meigen, 1818)
- Lestremia nigra Blanchard, 1852
- Lestremia novaezealandiae Marshall, 1896
- Lestremia palikuensis Hardy, 1960
- Lestremia parvostylia Jaschhof, 1994
- Lestremia pinites Meunier, 1904
- Lestremia sanctijohanni Rao, 1951
- Lestremia solidaginis (Felt, 1907)
- Lestremia ugandae Barnes, 1936
