= Orseolia oryzae =

Asian rice gall midge

Scientific classification
- Kingdom: Animalia
- Phylum: Arthropoda
- Clade: Pancrustacea
- Class: Insecta
- Order: Diptera
- Family: Cecidomyiidae
- Genus: Orseolia
- Species: O. oryzae

Binomial name
- Orseolia oryzae Wood-Mason, 1889

Synonyms
- Cecidomyia oryzae Wood-Mason, 1889; Orseolia oryzicola; Pachydiplosis oryzae (Wood-Mason, 1889)

Species of fly

Orseolia oryzae, also called the Asian rice gall midge, is a species of small fly in the family Cecidomyiidae. It is a major insect pest of rice. The damage to the crop is done by the larvae which form galls commonly known as "silver shoots" or "onion shoots". The rice plant is stunted and the seed heads fail to develop.

== History ==
In 1890, an unidentified insect was found to be attacking the rice crop in Munger district of Bihar, in India. The English zoologist James Wood-Mason identified the insect as a midge, called it Cecidomyia oryzae, and wrote about it in the American Naturalist, but did not formally describe it. The original outbreak faded away, but another occurred in Mysore in 1901, and others followed. By 1922, the rice crop in Tonkin Province in northern Vietnam was devastated and in 1936, crops in Indonesia were being attacked. It was the Indian entomologist M.S. Mani who in 1934 formally described the insect, retaining the name given it by Wood-Mason, because this was already widely known. In 1941 the midge was reported to be damaging crops in China and in 1946, it was reported from Sudan. In 1951, the Chinese researchers Li and Chiu worked out its life history. Even so, until the next decade it was a minor pest. Suddenly with the Green Revolution came higher yielding but more susceptible varieties, and ever since then O. oryzae has been among the top four insect pests (overall, not just in rice) in South and Southeast Asia and China.

== Description ==
The Asian rice gall midge is a fly about the size of a mosquito. The females are about 3.5 mm (0.14 in) long, bright red, with broad abdomens and dense short hair, while the males are slightly smaller, yellowish-brown and more slender. O. oryzae and O. oryzivora are morphologically, and even microscopically, indistinguishable, and so DNA differentiation methods have been developed.

== Distribution ==
It is a major insect pest of rice in Southern and Southeast Asia. The pest is distributed in various regions of India, Asia, and other neighboring countries and farmers face many problems due to the monetary loss caused by this insect pest. It is also found in rice-growing regions of Africa.

== Life cycle ==
The adults are mainly nocturnal and hide during the day. The females lay small batches of eggs (two to six) on the undersides of rice leaves, totalling 100-400 in a lifespan. The eggs are red at first, but by the time they hatch, two to four days later, they are chocolate-brown. The tiny larvae crawl down the leaf sheath till they reach the leaf axil where they bore their way into the stem. After feeding for about ten days and forming a gall, they pupate inside. Four to seven days later they use spines on the tip of the abdomen to make a hole in the gall near its tip. Here the adult insects emerge. They live for three or four days, and there may be as many as eight generations of midge in the year.

== Hosts ==
Oryza sativa, Cynodon dactylon, and Isachne aristatum. Scientific investigation of O. sativa resistance against O. oryzae began in India in 1948, and O. oryzae virulence against these O. sativa cultivars was first observed in 1969.

== Damage ==
The larvae of the Asian rice gall midge irritate the tissues of the rice plant which forms a gall commonly known as a "silver shoot" or "onion shoot". This is a pale cylindrical, hollow tube with a green tip replacing the normal culm (stem). The gall is formed from the walls of the leaf sheath growing together, after which the culm stops developing. The stem is stunted and the seed-head does not develop. When the adult insects emerge, the gall withers away and the shoot dies. The plant may respond by producing more tillers, but these usually become infected in their turn. The disease may be localised and patchy or widespread throughout the crop.
