= Orseolia oryzivora =

African rice gall midge

Scientific classification
- Kingdom: Animalia
- Phylum: Arthropoda
- Clade: Pancrustacea
- Class: Insecta
- Order: Diptera
- Family: Cecidomyiidae
- Genus: Orseolia
- Species: O. oryzivora

Binomial name
- Orseolia oryzivora Harris & Gagné, 1982

Species of fly

Orseolia oryzivora, also called the African rice gall midge, is a species of small fly in the family Cecidomyiidae. It is a major insect pest of rice crops in Africa.

== Monitoring ==
Orseolia oryzivora and O. oryzae are morphologically, and even microscopically, indistinguishable, and so DNA differentiation methods have been developed.
