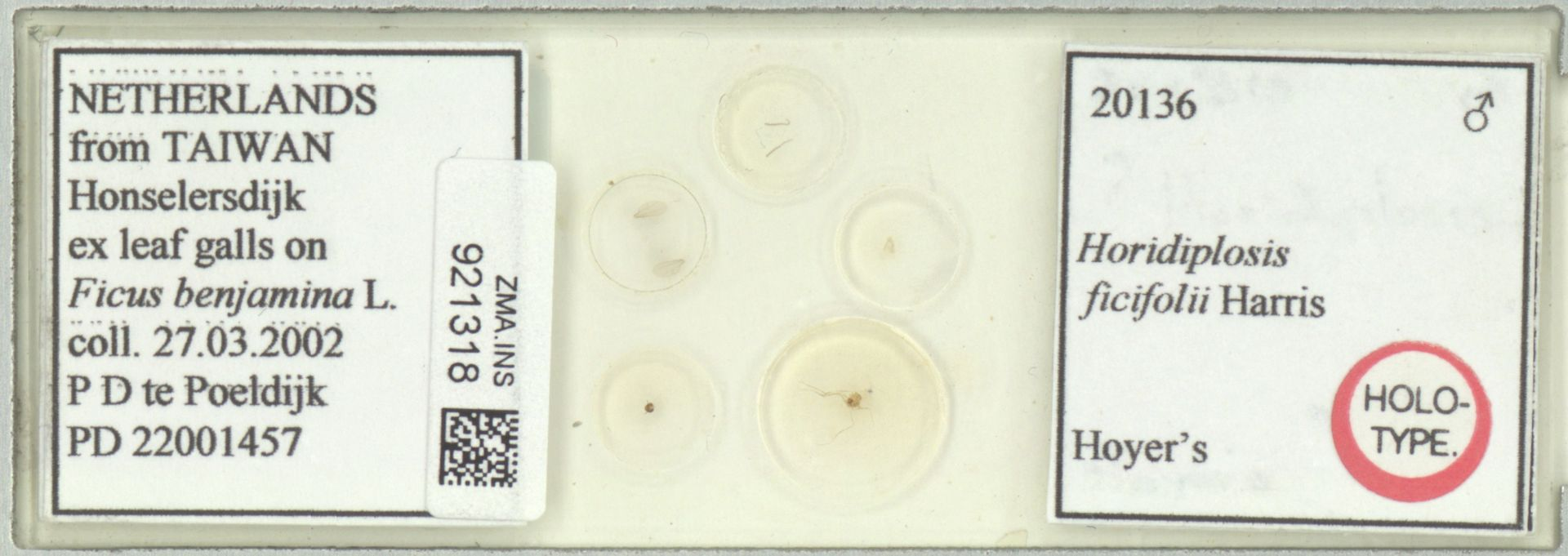

Scientific classification
- Domain: Eukaryota
- Kingdom: Animalia
- Phylum: Arthropoda
- Class: Insecta
- Order: Diptera
- Family: Cecidomyiidae
- Genus: Horidiplosis
- Species: H. ficifolii

Binomial name
- Horidiplosis ficifolii (Harris, 2003)

= Horidiplosis ficifolii =

Species of midge

Horidiplosis ficifolii is a species of midges from the genus Horidiplosis. The species was originally described by K. M. Harris and L. J. W. de Goffau in 2003.

== Description ==
Horidiplosis ficifolii was identified from specimens collected in Denmark, Netherlands and the United Kingdom. Larvae can be found on fig leaves of the species Ficus benjamina. They develop in irregular blister galls on young leaves, which might resemble fungal or bacterial leaf spots. Larvae can grow up to 2.0 mm and are rosy-orange. Both adults can have a wingspan up to 2.0 mm. Female specimens are slightly larger.

== Ecology ==
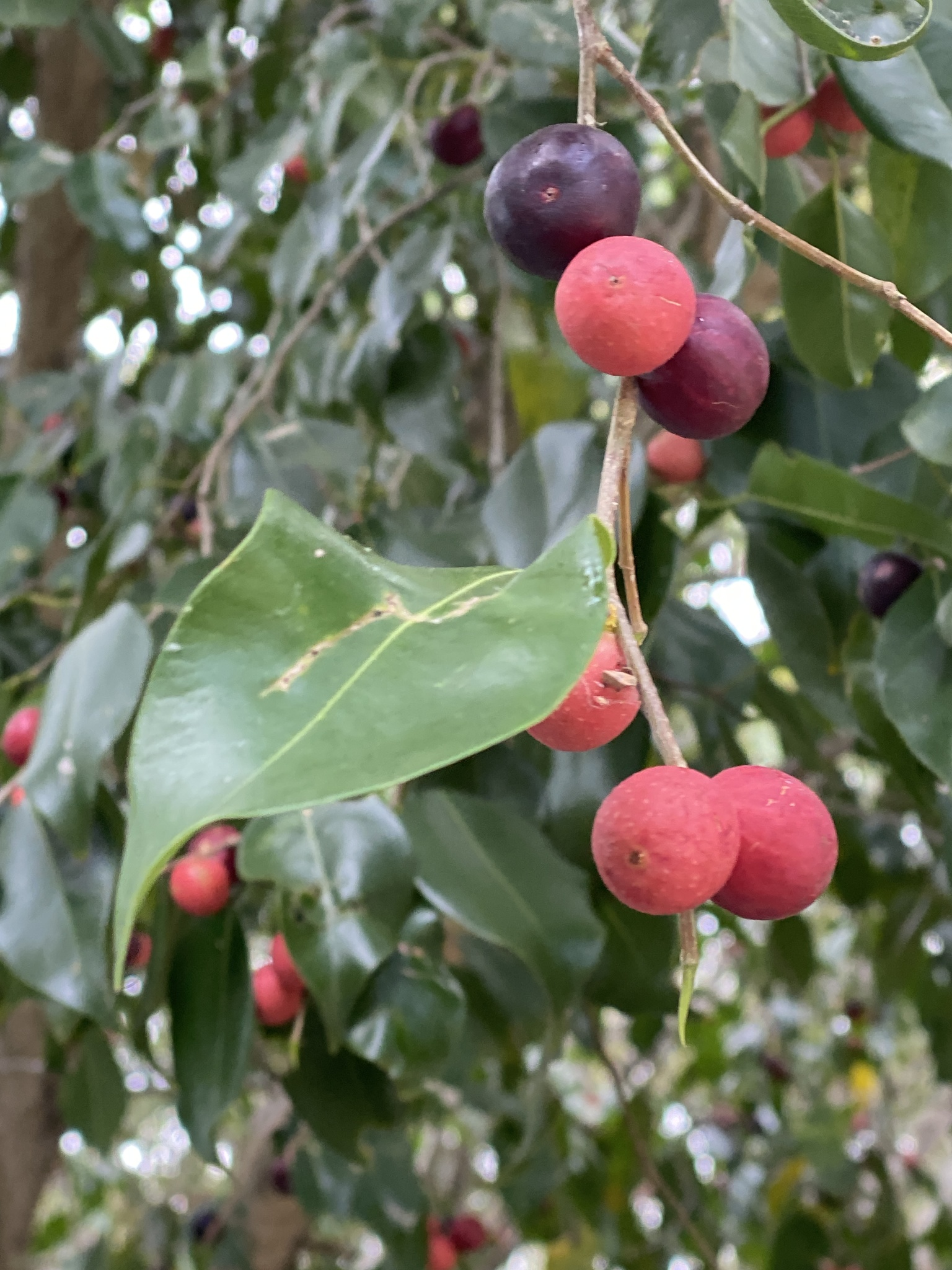

Horidiplosis ficifolii has the fig species Ficus benjamina as host.

== Etymology ==
"ficifolii" means from fig leaves, which indicates that the species was identified from specimens collected from ornamental fig leaves.
