= Haplusia =

Scientific classification
- Domain: Eukaryota
- Kingdom: Animalia
- Phylum: Arthropoda
- Class: Insecta
- Order: Diptera
- Family: Cecidomyiidae
- Genus: Haplusia; Karsch, 1877

Genus of flies

Haplusia is a genus of gall midges and wood midges in the family Cecidomyiidae. There are more than 20 described species in Haplusia.

== Species ==
These 22 species belong to the genus Haplusia:

- Haplusia afrotropica Jaschhof
- Haplusia alexanderi Felt, 1921
- Haplusia bella (Skuse, 1888)
- Haplusia braziliensis Felt, 1915
- Haplusia brevipalpis (Rao, 1951)
- Haplusia cincta Felt, 1912
- Haplusia elliptica (Rao, 1956)
- Haplusia funebris Plakidas, 2007
- Haplusia fusca (Felt, 1908)
- Haplusia heteroptera Mamaev & Spungis, 1980
- Haplusia hondrui (Mamaev, 1964)
- Haplusia indica (Grover, 1970)
- Haplusia longipalpia (Rao, 1951)
- Haplusia longipalpis (Mamaev, 1964)
- Haplusia obscuripes (Mamaev, 1968)
- Haplusia pallida (Mamaev, 1966)
- Haplusia palpata (Mamaev, 1966)
- Haplusia plumipes Karsch, 1877
- Haplusia rubra (Felt, 1908)
- Haplusia spiculosa (Barnes, 1927)
- Haplusia spinigera Spungis, 1985
- Haplusia stricta Fedotova & Sidorenko, 2005
