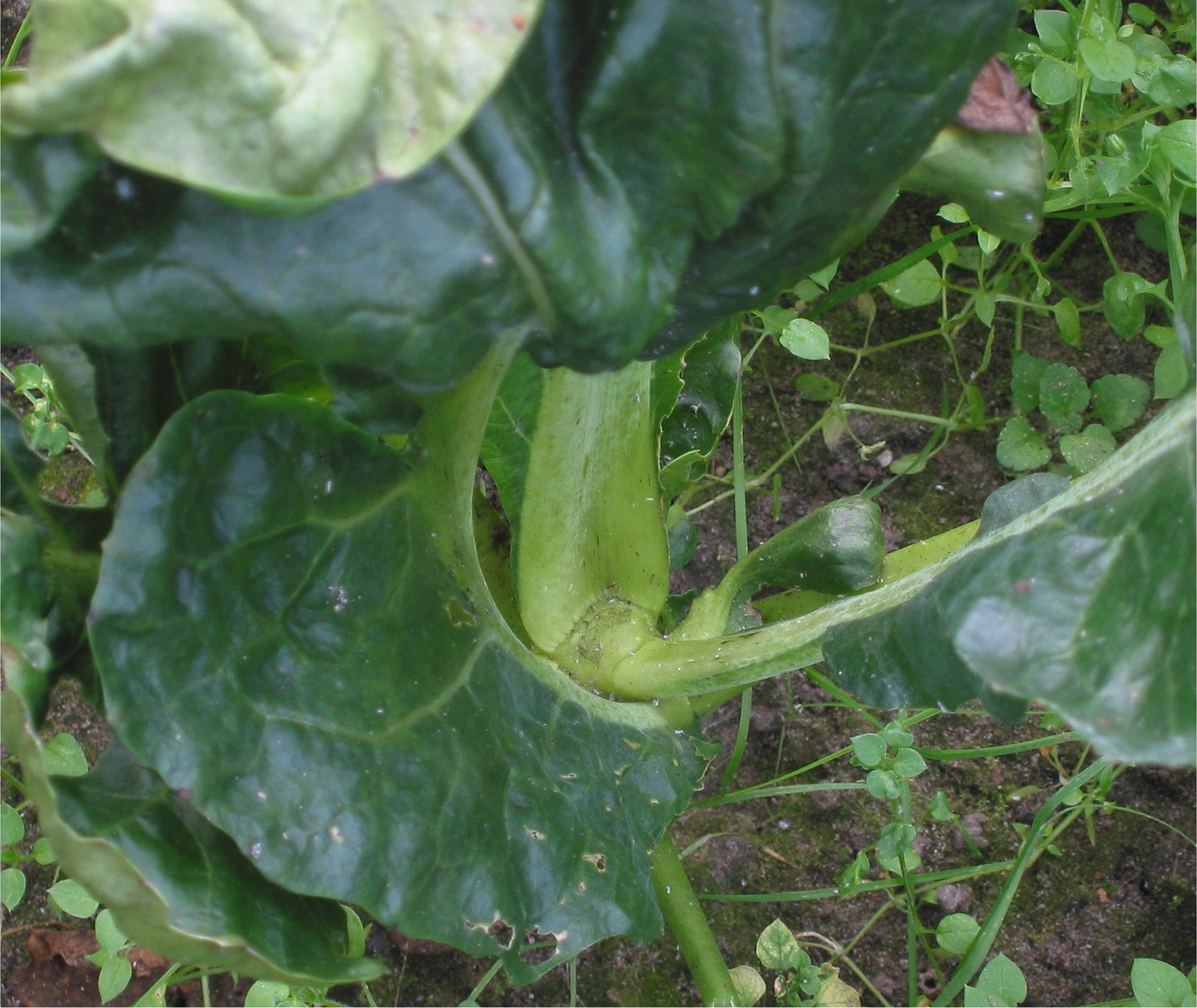
- Damage to a young cauliflower plant

Scientific classification
- Kingdom: Animalia
- Phylum: Arthropoda
- Class: Insecta
- Order: Diptera
- Family: Cecidomyiidae
- Genus: Contarinia
- Species: C. nasturtii

Binomial name
- Contarinia nasturtii (Kieffer, 1888)

= Contarinia nasturtii =

Species of fly

Contarinia nasturtii, the swede midge, is a small fly, the larvae of which infest brassica plants, causing twisting and distortion of the leaf stems and foliage including death of the growing point in seedlings, or damage to developing flower heads. It is native to Europe and Turkey, and has been introduced into North America where it is regarded as an invasive species.

== Life cycle ==
Adult swede midges are yellowish-brown and up to 2 mm (0.08 in) long, and live for up to three days. During this time the female lays about one hundred eggs in several batches on the leaves of suitable host plants. The eggs need moisture to hatch and the larvae emerge in between one and ten days at 30 to 10 °C (86 to 50 °F) respectively. They feed for between one and three weeks, again depending on temperature, and produce a gall. When fully grown they descend to the soil and either pupate in an oval cocoon at a depth of about 5 cm (2 in) or, in adverse weather conditions, become dormant in a globular cocoon buried deeper in the soil. The adults emerge one and a half to seven weeks after pupation and there are several generations each year.

When the dormancy period is due to drought, development continues after wetting, but when it is due to low temperature, development restarts only after a prolonged period of cold weather. The larvae then make their way to the soil surface before burying themselves shallowly and forming an oval cocoon.

== Host-attraction ==
A recent study found that C. nasturtii, despite being crucifer-specialist, may not depend on the crucifer-specific glucosinolates. Therefore, other volatile compounds emitted by crucifer plants may mediate the C. nasturtii host attraction.

== Damage ==
Host plants for the swede midge include cauliflower, broccoli, cabbage, Brussels sprouts, kohlrabi and a number of wild plants in the brassica family including shepherd's purse, field penny-cress, field peppergrass and yellow rocket. When a seedling or young plant is attacked, the larvae conglomerate and secrete saliva which softens the plant cuticle and epidermis, sucking in the resulting fluid. On a leaf stalk, this damages the tissues and results in the formation of a corky gall. The undamaged side of the stalk continues to grow normally which results in twisting and distortion. The growing point can be completely killed and secondary bacterial infections can occur. If the infection occurs in the flowering stage of cauliflower, it causes a stunted, multi-branched, tuft-like appearance of the flower-head.

== Distribution ==
Contarinia nasturtii is native to Europe and Turkey. It was first detected in Canada in 1996 and is now present in Ontario, Quebec, Nova Scotia and Prince Edward Island. In the United States it was detected in the western part of New York state in 2004 and is now also known from Connecticut, Massachusetts, Michigan, New Jersey, Ohio, and Vermont. It is regarded as an invasive species in North America.
