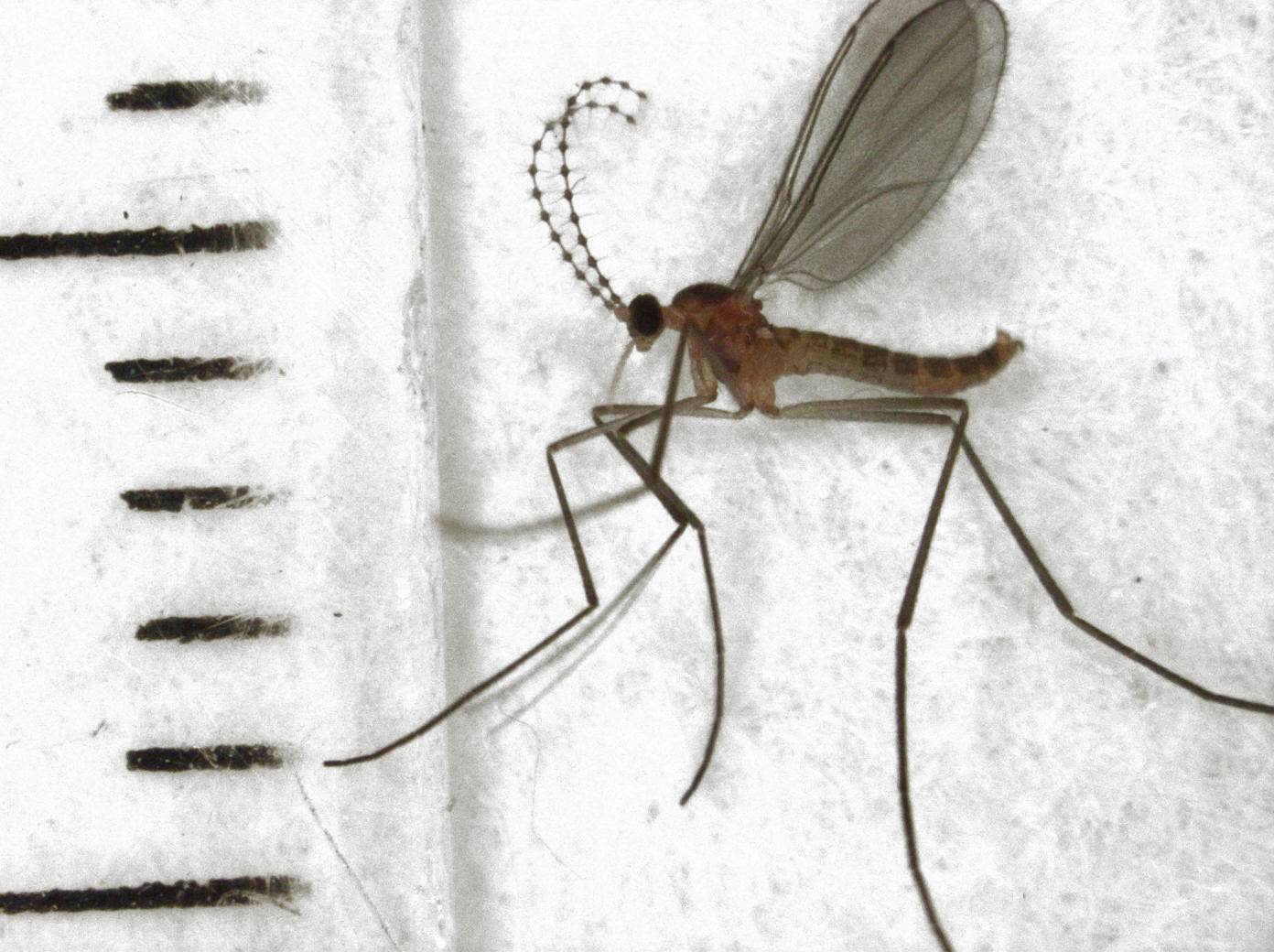
- Photo of an adult male Lestremia

Scientific classification
- Domain: Eukaryota
- Kingdom: Animalia
- Phylum: Arthropoda
- Class: Insecta
- Order: Diptera
- Family: Cecidomyiidae
- Subfamily: Lestremiinae

= Lestremiinae =

Subfamily of flies

Lestremiinae is a subfamily of Cecidomyiidae. It is composed of 105 described species classified into 13 genera. The larvae feed on fungi, primarily in rotting wood.

== Genera ==
- Allarete Pritchard, 1951
- Allaretella Meyer & Spungis, 1994
- Anarete Halliday, 1833
- Anaretella Enderlein, 1911
- Buschingomyia Jaschhof & Jaschhof, 2011
- Conarete Pritchard, 1951
- Eomastix Jaschhof, 2009
- Gongromastix Enderlein, 1936
- Insulestremia Jaschhof, 2004
- Lestremia Macquart, 1826
- Mangogrostix Mamaev, 1985
- Neolestremia Mani, 1934
- Wasmanniella Kieffer, 1898
