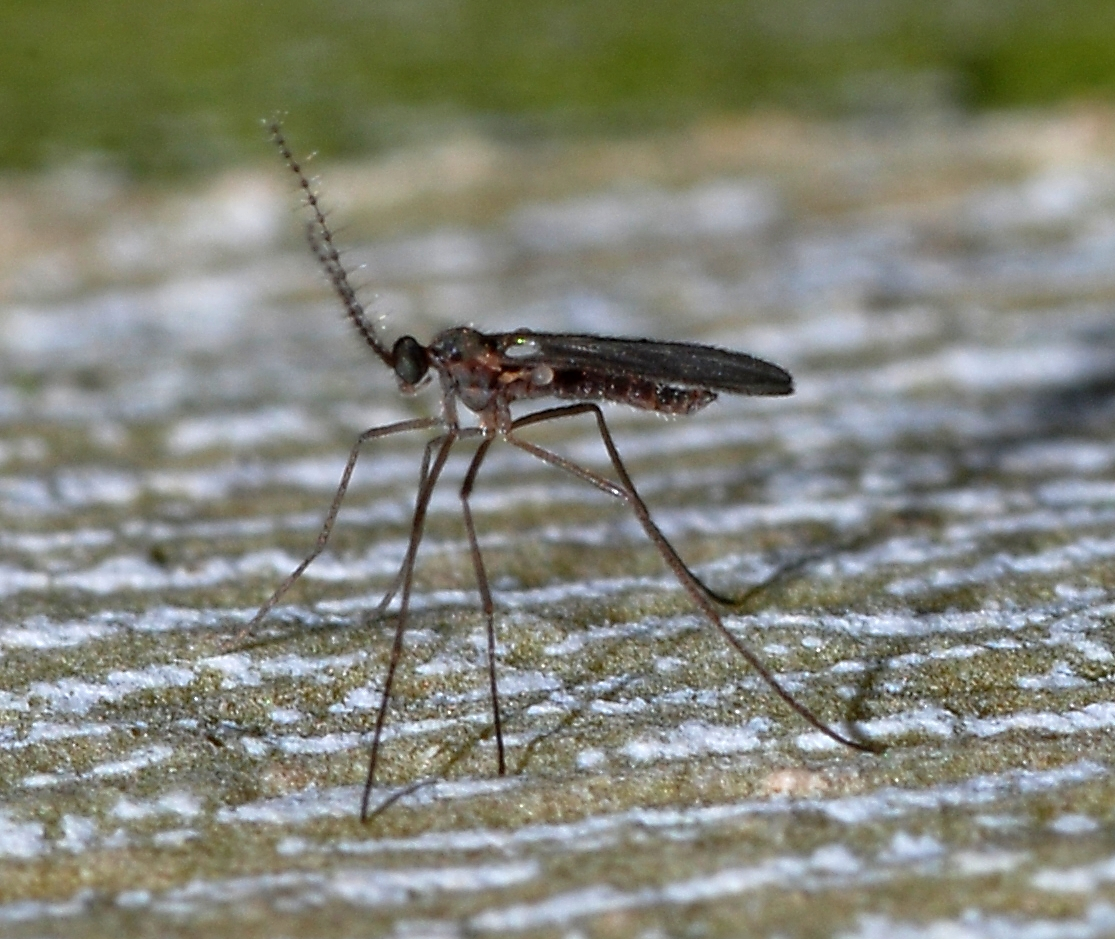

Scientific classification
- Kingdom: Animalia
- Phylum: Arthropoda
- Clade: Pancrustacea
- Class: Insecta
- Order: Diptera
- Suborder: Nematocera
- Infraorder: Bibionomorpha
- Superfamily: Sciaroidea
- Family: Cecidomyiidae; Newman, 1835

Subfamilies
- Catotrichinae; Cecidomyiinae; Lestremiinae; Micromyinae; Porricondylinae; Winnertziinae

Synonyms
- Cecidomyidae (common misspelling); Itonididae

= Cecidomyiidae =

Cecidomyiidae Temporal range: Late Jurassic–Recent

Family of flies

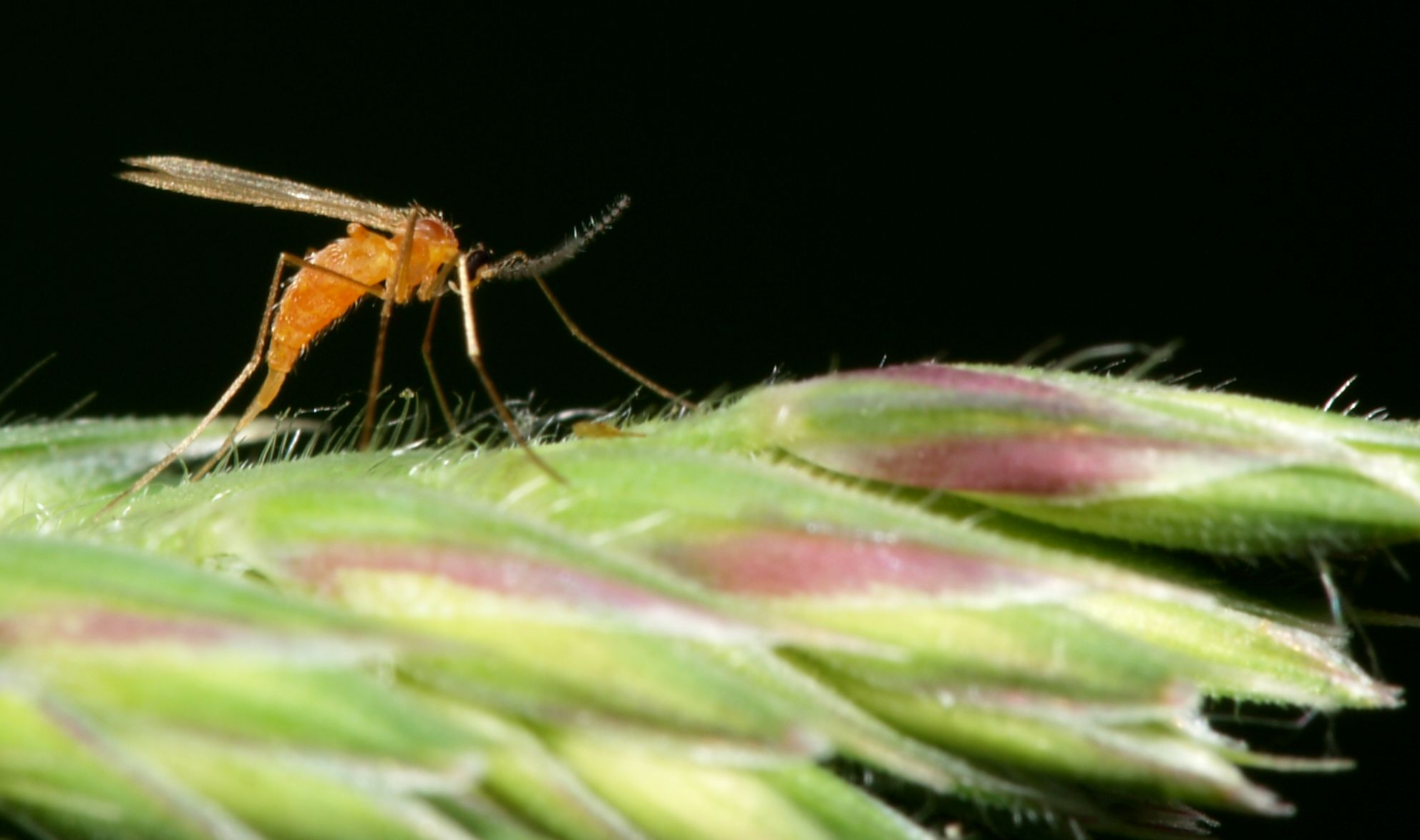
A cecidomyiid laying eggs on grass

Cecidomyiid in copula

Cecidomyiid oviposting into boreholes of bark beetles on a fallen beech

Cecidomyiidae is a family of flies known as gall midges or gall gnats. As the name implies, the larvae of most gall midges feed within plant tissue, creating abnormal plant growths called galls. Cecidomyiidae are very fragile small insects usually only 2–3 mm (0.079–0.118 in) in length; many are less than 1 mm (0.039 in) long. They are characterised by hairy wings, unusual in the order Diptera, and have long antennae. Some Cecidomyiids are also known for the strange phenomenon of paedogenesis in which the larval stage reproduces without maturing first. In some species, the daughter larvae consume the mother, while in others, reproduction occurs later on in the egg or pupa.

More than 6,650 species and 830 genera are described worldwide, though this is certainly an underestimate of the actual diversity of this family. A DNA metabarcoding study published in 2016 estimated the fauna of Canada alone to be in excess of 16,000 species, hinting at a staggering global count of over 1 million cecidomyiid species that have yet to be described, which would make it the most speciose single family in the entire animal kingdom. A second similar metabarcoding study performed in Costa Rica also found Cecidomyiidae to be the most diverse family of flies, supporting this assertion. A third metabarcoding study in 2023 concluded that Cecidomyiidae are the single most diverse family collected from malaise traps all around the world and are a dominant component of insect diversity, comprising about 20% of all species collected.

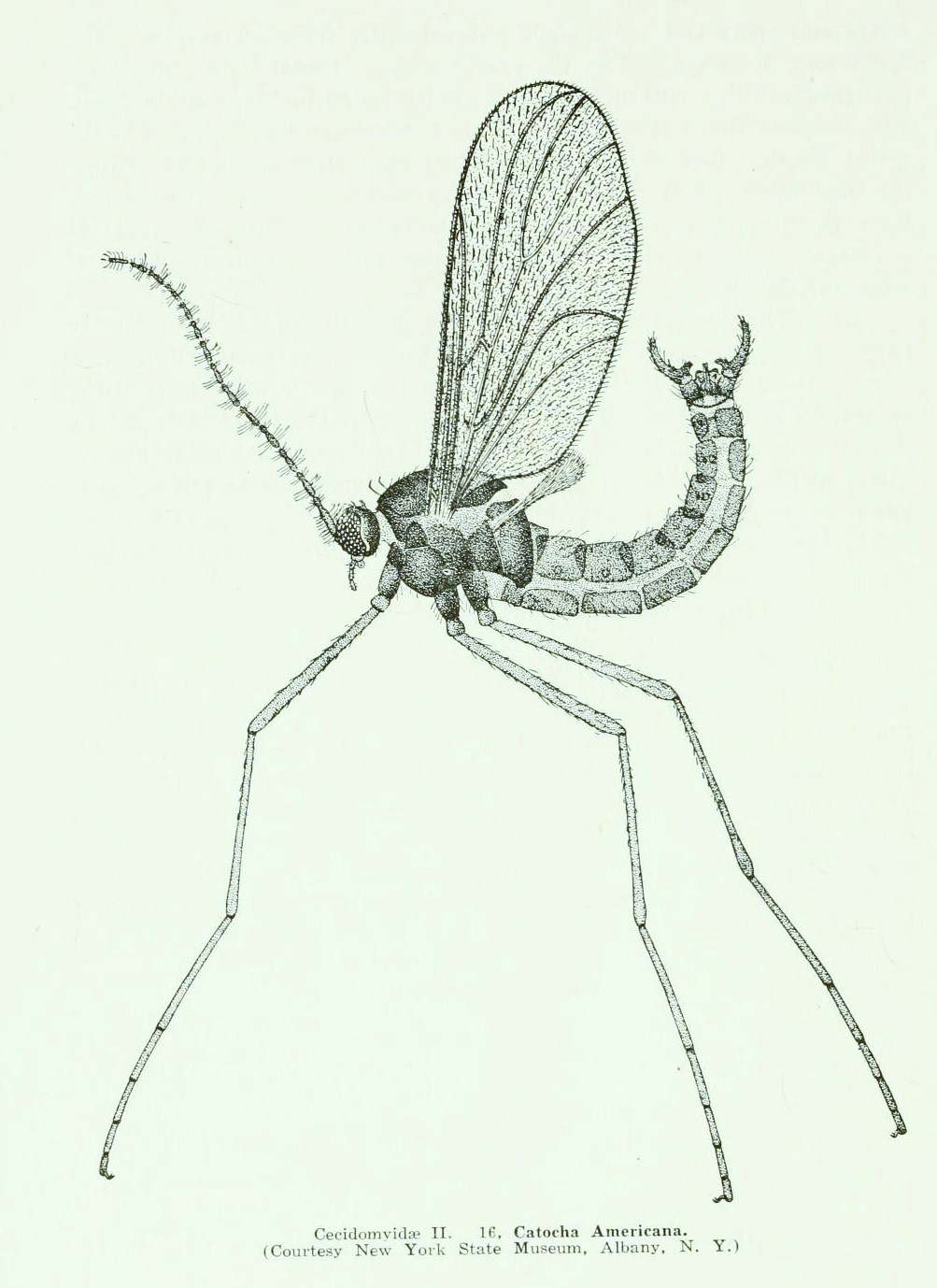
Catocha americana

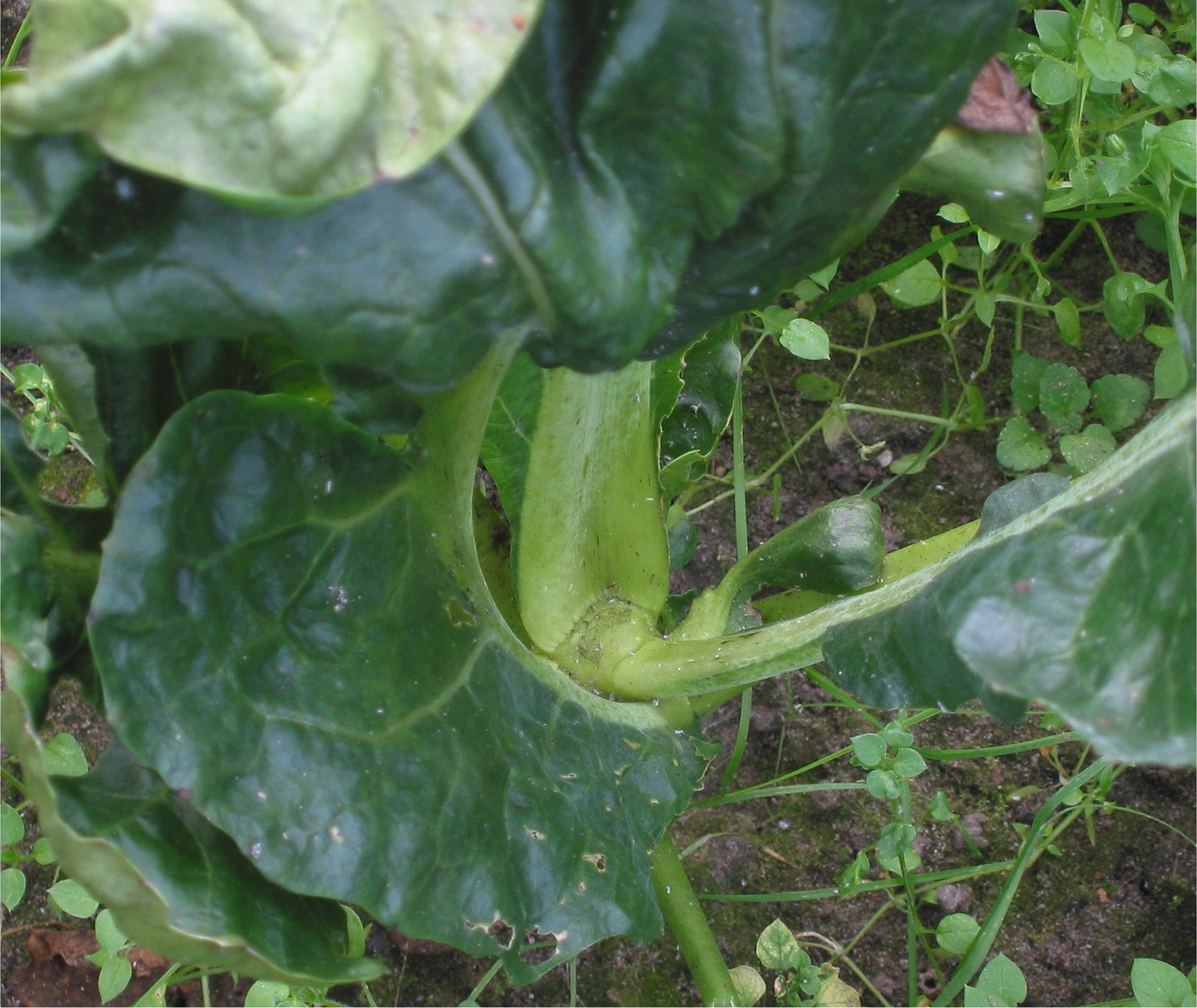
Contarinia nasturtii damage on cauliflower

== Description ==
Cecidomyiidae are minute to small (0.5–3.0 mm), rarely larger (up to 8 mm, wing length 15 mm) flies with a delicate appearance. Except for a few genera with reduced wings, the eyes are holoptic. The mouthparts are reduced. Cecidomyiid antennae are notably long, with 12–14 segments, (sometimes fewer and up to 40 in some genera). The antennal segments either consist of a basal thickening and petiole or they are binodal, with a proximal node, an intermediate petiole and a distal node. Basal, medial, and apical whorls of hairs occur on the antennal segments. In some species, whorls of loop-shaped sensory filaments are also found, the basal or medial one sometimes being reduced. Some gall flies have only one (basal) whorl of hairs on the antennal segments, and the sensoria (transparent sensory appendages) differ in size and shape. The filaments are thread-like in the Porricondylinae and in all the Cecidomyiinae and take the form of long loops in the supertribe Cecidomyiidi). Ocelli are present only in the Lestremiinae. The wings are usually clear, rarely patterned. The wing bears microtrichia, often as scales, and some species have macrotrichia. The number of longitudinal veins is reduced. Only veins R1, R4+5, M3+4 and Cu1 are well developed in most species. The medial veins M1 and M2 are developed only in primitive groups, and the costa usually has a break just beyond vein R5. The legs are long and slender, without apical bristles. Gall midge larvae, and many adults, are orange or yellow in color due to carotenoids. Cecidomyiidae are among the very few animals which can synthesize carotenoids, but its unknown to what degree de novo biosynthesis of carotenoids accounts for their characteristic color as opposed to dietary sequestration or endosymbionts. The genes responsible for carotenoid synthesis likely originate from horizontal gene transfer from a fungal donor.

Catochini wing veins

Cecidomyiinae wing veins

Lasiopterini wing veins

Lestremiini wing veins

Micromyini and Peromyiini wing veins

Porricondylinae (most) wing veins

Winnertziini wing veins

The genitalia of males consist of gonocoxites, gonostyles, aedeagus, and tergites 9 and 10. Lower (in the evolutionary sense) gall flies often have sclerotized parameres and a more or less transparent plate (the tegmen) located above theaedeagus-the tegmen. In higher gall flies, the parameres and tegmen are not developed. In these, instead, close to the aedeagus, is a triangular basal outgrowth of the gonocoxites called the gonosterna. Supporting structures called apodema are located near the base of the genitalia in males; these are often equipped with two outgrowths. The ovipositor is short, lamelliform, or long, mobile, and in some species, acicular.

The larva is peripneustic. The head is tiny, cone-shaped, and has two posterolateral extensions. The mouthparts are reduced, with minute styliform mandibles. The relatively prominent antennae are two-segmented. Integumental setae or papillae are important in taxonomy since they are constant in number within groups. The prothorax has sclerotized sternal spatula (most). The anus is terminal in the Lestremiinae and paedogenetic in the Porricondylinae and ventral in other groups. The pupa is exarate (in a few species it is enclosed within the last instar larval integument). The anterior spiracle and anterior angle of antennal bases is prominent (most).

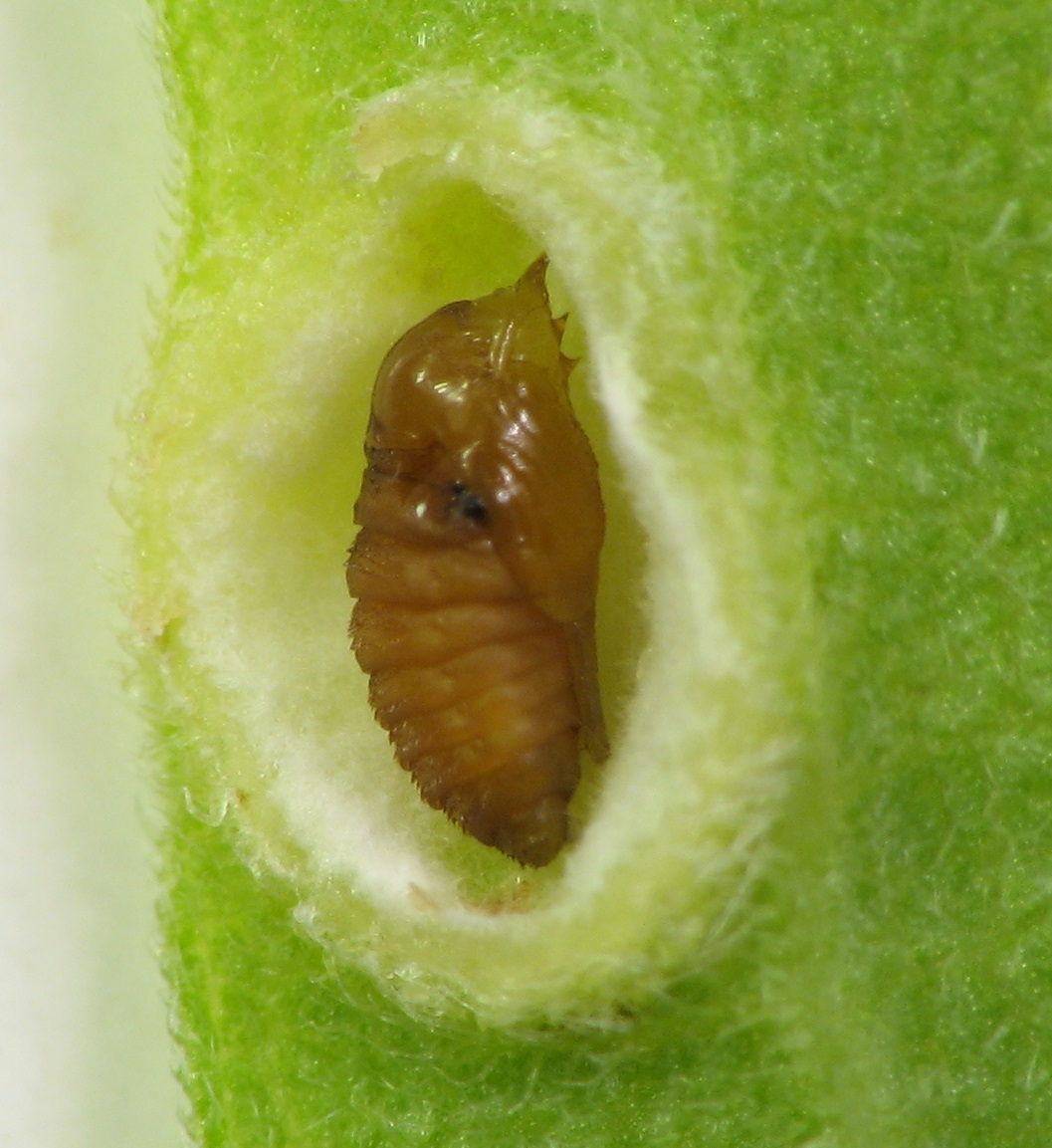
Asphondylia solidaginis, pupa in gall in Solidago sp.

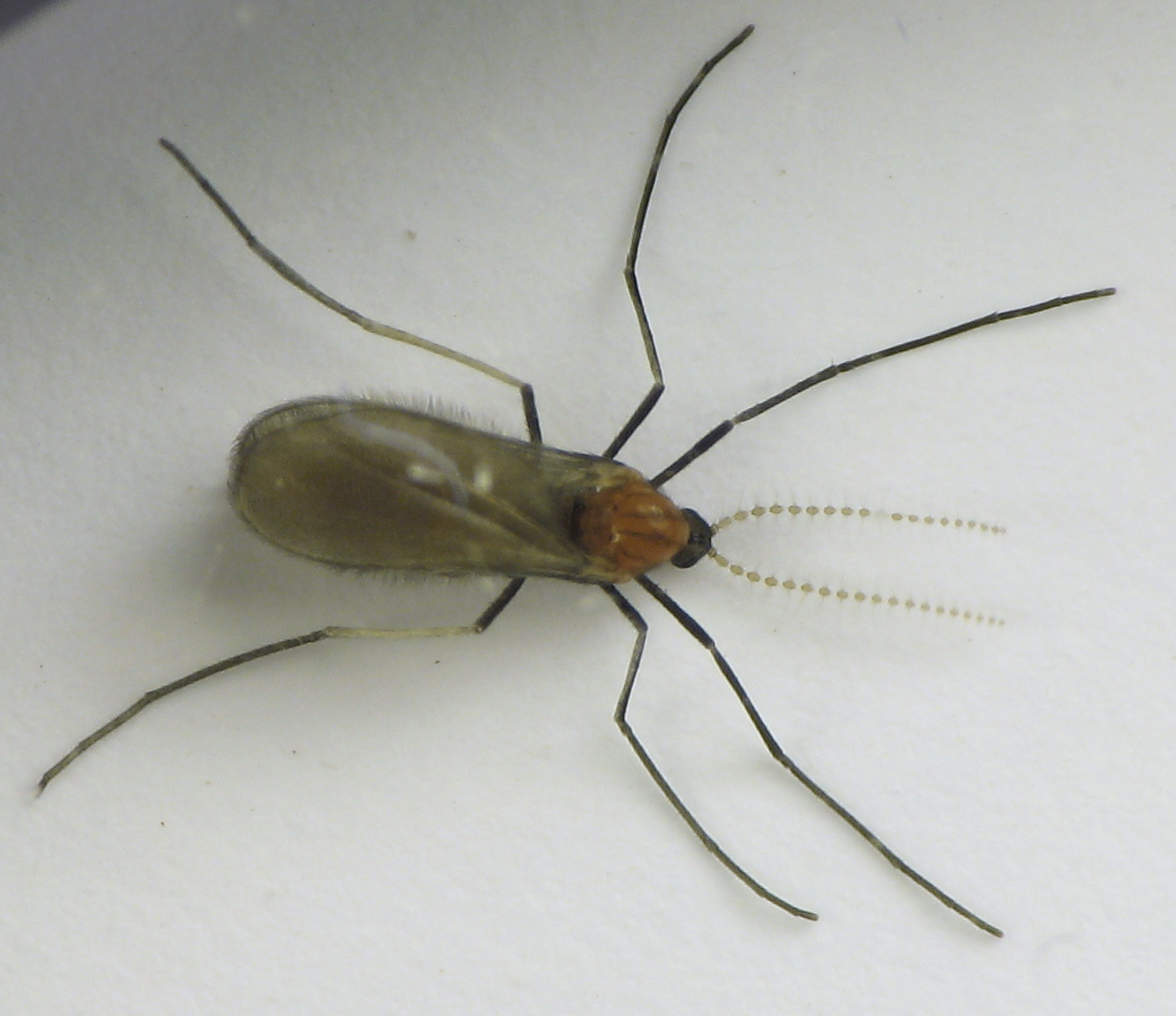
Rhopalomyia solidaginis

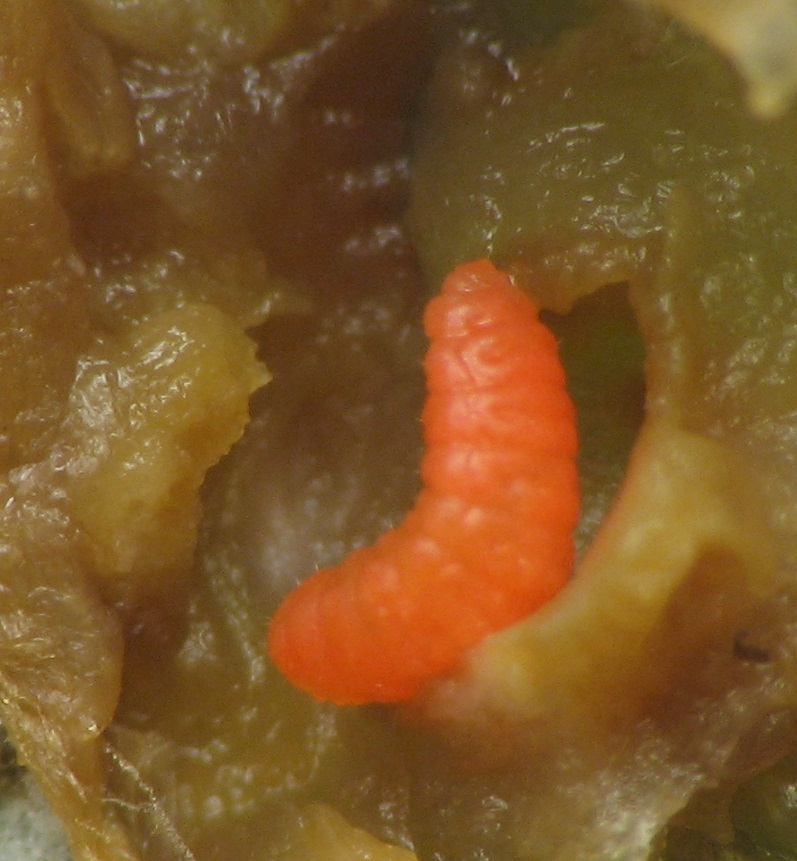
Vitisiella larva

== As a pest or biological control ==
Many species are economically significant, especially the Hessian fly, a wheat pest, as the galls cause severe damage. Other important pests of this family are the wheat blossom midge Sitodiplosis mosellana, the Asian rice gall midge (Orseolia oryzae) and the African rice gall midge O. oryzivora. The millet grain midge (Geromyia penniseti), sorghum midge (Contarinia sorghicola), and African rice gall midge (Orseolia oryzivora) attack grain crops such as pearl millet in Mali and other countries of the Sahel in West Africa.

Other pests are the coffee flower midge (Dasyneura coffeae), Soybean pod gall midge, (Asphondylia yushimai) pine needle gall midge (Thecodiplosis japonensis), the lentil flower midge (Contarinia lentis), the lucerne flower midge (C. medicaginis), and the alfalfa sprout midge (Dasineura ignorata) on the Leguminosae; the black locust tree gall midge (Obolodiplosis robiniae), the swede midge (Contarinia nasturtii), and the brassica pod midge (Dasineura brassicae) on the Cruciferae; the pear midge (Contarinia pyrivora) and the raspberry cane midge (Resseliella theobaldi) on fruit crops; Horidiplosis ficifolii on ornamental figs, and the rosette gall midge (Rhopalomyia solidaginis) on goldenrod stalks, Porricondylini spp. on Citrus, Lestremia spp. on sweet potato, yam, ginger, garlic, onions, taro tubers, and potato, Lestodiplosis spp., Acaroletes spp., and Aphidoletes spp. on oranges, and Arthrocnodax spp. on limes.

In South Africa, Dasineura rubiformis has been deployed against the invasive Australian Acacia mearnsii; it oviposits eggs into the flowers which develop into galls, thus reducing seed production.

Parasitoids hosted by Cecidomyiidae include Braconidae (Opiinae, Euphorinae), Eurytomidae, Eulophidae, Torymidae, Pteromalidae, Eupelmidae, Trichogrammatidae, and Aphelinidae. All contain species which are actual or potential biological agents.

A large number of gall midge species are natural enemies of other crop pests. Their larvae are predatory, and some are reported as parasitic. The most common prey are aphids and spider mites, followed by scale insects, then other small prey such as whiteflies and thrips, which eat the eggs of other insects or mites. As the larvae are incapable of moving considerable distances, a substantial population of prey must be present before the adults lay eggs, and the Cecidiomyiidae are most frequently seen during pest outbreaks. One species, Aphidoletes aphidimyza, is an important component of biological control programs for greenhouse crops and is widely sold in the United States.
