= Eskimaspis =

Eskimaspis Temporal range: Early Devonian, 419–393 Ma

Scientific classification
- Kingdom: Animalia
- Phylum: Chordata
- Class: †Placodermi
- Order: †Arthrodira
- Genus: †Eskimaspis; Dineley & Yuhai, 1984

Species
- †Eskimaspis heintzi Dineley & Yuhai, 1984 (type)

Genus of extinct fish

Eskimaspis is an extinct monospecific genus of arthrodire placoderm fish from the Early Devonian period. The type species Eskimaspis heintzi was described in 1984, and was found in the Peel Sound Formation on Prince of Wales Island in Arctic Canada.

== Etymology ==
The generic name Eskimaspis was named after the aboriginal Eskimo people of the Canadian Arctic. The species name heintzi was named in honor of palaeontologist Anatol Heintz.

== Classification ==
Eskimaspis is one of the more basal members of the order Arthrodira, as shown in the cladogram below:

- - Eurycaraspis incilis
  - Lunaspis broilii
  - Arthrodira
    - Yujiangolepis liujingensis
    - - Antarctaspis mcmurdoensis
      - - Wuttagoonaspidae
          - Wuttagoonaspis fletcheri
          - Yiminaspis shenme
        - - - Aethaspis major
            - Aethaspis utahensis
          - - - Lehmanosteus hyperboreus
              - - - Aleosteus eganensis
                  - Simblaspis cachensis
                - - - Kujdanowiaspis buczacziensis
                    - Kujdanowiaspis podolica
                  - - - Erikaspis zychi
                      - Sigaspis lepidophora
                    - - Eskimaspis heintzi
                      - - Baringaspis dineleyi
                        - Proaethaspis ohioensis
                      - - Anarthraspis chamberlini
                        - Heightingtonaspis anglica
                        - Phyllolepida
                          - Gavinaspis convergens
                          - - Austrophyllolepis sp.
                            - Cowralepis mclachlani
                            - Phyllolepis orvini
                            - Placolepis budawangensis
            - - Actinolepidae
                - Bollandaspis woschmidti
                - - Actinolepis spinosa
                  - - Actinolepis magna
                    - Actinolepis tuberculata
              - - Bryantolepis brachycephalus
                - Phlyctaenioidei
                  - Phlyctaeniidae
                  - - - Groenlandaspidae
                      - - Arctaspidae
                          Dicksonosteus arcticus
                        - Arctolepidae
                    - Brachythoraci
