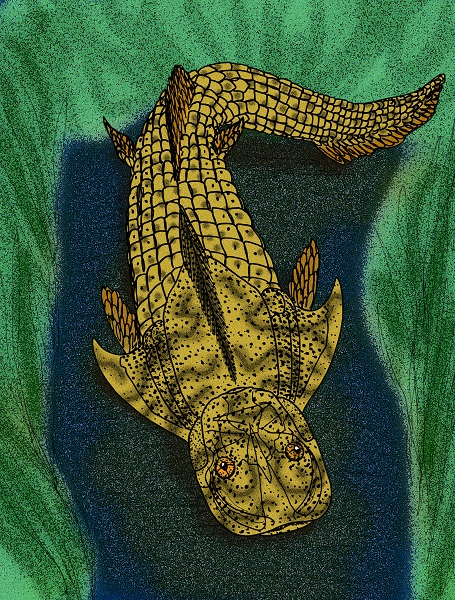
- Yiminaspis shenme

Scientific classification
- Kingdom: Animalia
- Phylum: Chordata
- Class: †Placodermi
- Order: †Arthrodira
- Family: †Wuttagoonaspidae
- Genus: †Yiminaspis; Dupret, 2008

Species
- †Yiminaspis shenme Dupret, 2008 (type)

= Yiminaspis =

Yiminaspis Temporal range: Late Emsian, 407–393 Ma

Extinct genus of fishes

Yiminaspis is an extinct monospecific genus of primitive arthrodire placoderm fish from Emsian-aged marine strata in Yunnan, China. The type species Yiminaspis shenme was named and described in 2008, and is known from a flattened partial skull and portions of the thoracic armor.

== Etymology ==
The genus name translates as "Yi People's shield", deriving from the Chinese name Yímín (simplified Chinese: 彝民; traditional Chinese: 彞民; lit. 'Yi People', an ethnic group in China, Vietnam, and Thailand) and the Greek word aspis ("a type of round shield"). The specific name is from Chinese shénme (simplified Chinese: 什么; traditional Chinese: 什麼; lit. 'what'), as in "what is it?" reference to the peculiar anatomy of this prehistoric fish.

== Classification ==
Yiminaspis belongs to the family Wuttagoonaspidae, and is closely related to Wuttagoonaspis. It is one of the more basal members of the order Arthrodira, as shown in the cladogram below:

- - Eurycaraspis incilis
  - Lunaspis broilii
  - Arthrodira
    - Yujiangolepis liujingensis
    - - Antarctaspis mcmurdoensis
      - - Wuttagoonaspidae
          - Wuttagoonaspis fletcheri
          - Yiminaspis shenme
        - - - Aethaspis major
            - Aethaspis utahensis
          - - - Lehmanosteus hyperboreus
              - - - Aleosteus eganensis
                  - Simblaspis cachensis
                - - - Kujdanowiaspis buczacziensis
                    - Kujdanowiaspis podolica
                  - - - Erikaspis zychi
                      - Sigaspis lepidophora
                    - - Eskimaspis heintzi
                      - - Baringaspis dineleyi
                        - Proaethaspis ohioensis
                      - - Anarthraspis chamberlini
                        - Heightingtonaspis anglica
                        - Phyllolepida
                          - Gavinaspis convergens
                          - - Austrophyllolepis sp.
                            - Cowralepis mclachlani
                            - Phyllolepis orvini
                            - Placolepis budawangensis
            - - Actinolepidae
                - Bollandaspis woschmidti
                - - Actinolepis spinosa
                  - - Actinolepis magna
                    - Actinolepis tuberculata
              - - Bryantolepis brachycephalus
                - Phlyctaenioidei
                  - Phlyctaeniidae
                  - - - Groenlandaspidae
                      - - Arctaspidae
                          Dicksonosteus arcticus
                        - Arctolepidae
                    - Brachythoraci
