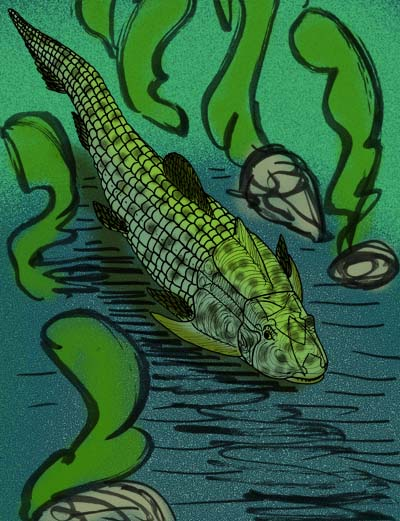
- Wuttagoonaspis fletcheri

Scientific classification
- Kingdom: Animalia
- Phylum: Chordata
- Class: †Placodermi
- Order: †Arthrodira
- Family: †Wuttagoonaspidae
- Genus: †Wuttagoonaspis; Ritchie, 1973

Species
- †Wuttagoonaspis fletcheri Ritchie, 1973 (type); †Wuttagoonaspis milligani Young & Goujet, 2003

= Wuttagoonaspis =

Wuttagoonaspis Temporal range: Middle Devonian, 393–382 Ma

Genus of extinct fish

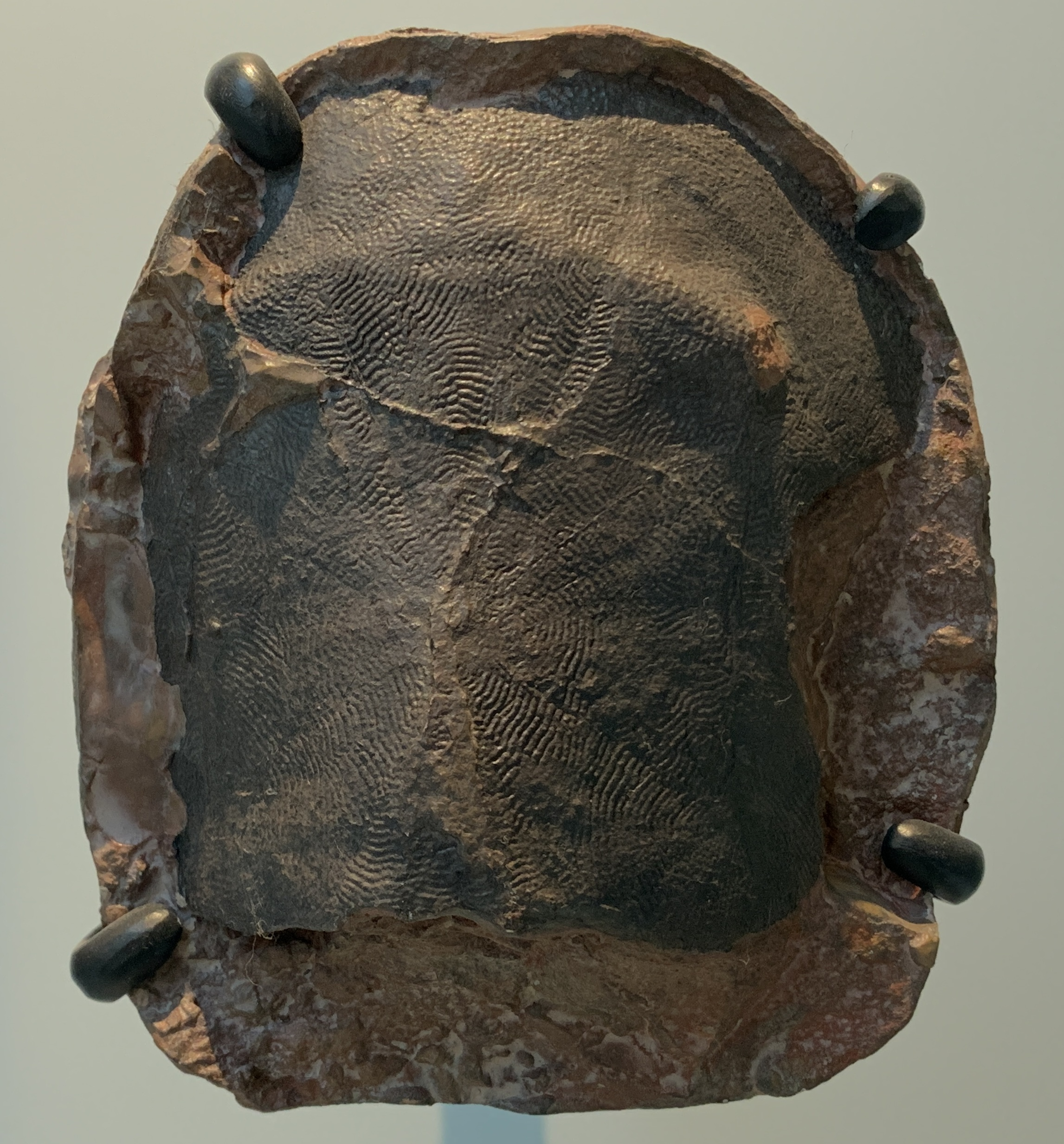
Wuttagoonaspis fletcheri head shield, cast of a specimen from Tambua, New South Wales, Australia.

Wuttagoonaspis is an extinct genus of primitive arthrodire placoderm fish from the Middle Devonian of Australia. The box-like skull is up to 18 centimeters in length, and the median dorsal plate averages in length about 10 centimeters. It contains two species: the type species Wuttagoonaspis fletcheri, described by Ritchie in 1973, and Wuttagoonaspis milligani, described by Young and Goujet in 2003.

== Classification ==
Wuttagoonaspis belongs to the family Wuttagoonaspidae, and is closely related to Yiminaspis. It is one of the more basal members of the order Arthrodira, as shown in the cladogram below:

- - Eurycaraspis incilis
  - Lunaspis broilii
  - Arthrodira
    - Yujiangolepis liujingensis
    - - Antarctaspis mcmurdoensis
      - - Wuttagoonaspidae
          - Wuttagoonaspis fletcheri
          - Yiminaspis shenme
        - - - Aethaspis major
            - Aethaspis utahensis
          - - - Lehmanosteus hyperboreus
              - - - Aleosteus eganensis
                  - Simblaspis cachensis
                - - - Kujdanowiaspis buczacziensis
                    - Kujdanowiaspis podolica
                  - - - Erikaspis zychi
                      - Sigaspis lepidophora
                    - - Eskimaspis heintzi
                      - - Baringaspis dineleyi
                        - Proaethaspis ohioensis
                      - - Anarthraspis chamberlini
                        - Heightingtonaspis anglica
                        - Phyllolepida
                          - Gavinaspis convergens
                          - - Austrophyllolepis sp.
                            - Cowralepis mclachlani
                            - Phyllolepis orvini
                            - Placolepis budawangensis
            - - Actinolepidae
                - Bollandaspis woschmidti
                - - Actinolepis spinosa
                  - - Actinolepis magna
                    - Actinolepis tuberculata
              - - Bryantolepis brachycephalus
                - Phlyctaenioidei
                  - Phlyctaeniidae
                  - - - Groenlandaspidae
                      - - Arctaspidae
                          Dicksonosteus arcticus
                        - Arctolepidae
                    - Brachythoraci
