= Yujiangolepis =

Yujiangolepis Temporal range: Devonian: Pragian, 410–407 Ma

Scientific classification
- Kingdom: Animalia
- Phylum: Chordata
- Class: †Placodermi
- Order: †Arthrodira
- Genus: †Yujiangolepis; Wang, Pan & Wang, 1998

Species
- †Yujiangolepis liujingensis Wang, Pan & Wang, 1998 (type)

Genus of extinct fishes

Yujiangolepis is an extinct monospecific genus of arthrodire placoderm fish from the Pragian stage of the Devonian period. The type species is Yujiangolepis liujingensis, described from a single incomplete skull roof from the Nakaoling (Nagaoling) Formation of Hengxian, Guangxi, South China. It is one of the more basal members of the order Arthrodira, closely related to Antarctaspis, as shown in the cladogram below:

- - Eurycaraspis incilis
  - Lunaspis broilii
  - Arthrodira
    - Yujiangolepis liujingensis
    - - Antarctaspis mcmurdoensis
      - - Wuttagoonaspidae
          - Wuttagoonaspis fletcheri
          - Yiminaspis shenme
        - - - Aethaspis major
            - Aethaspis utahensis
          - - - Lehmanosteus hyperboreus
              - - - Aleosteus eganensis
                  - Simblaspis cachensis
                - - - Kujdanowiaspis buczacziensis
                    - Kujdanowiaspis podolica
                  - - - Erikaspis zychi
                      - Sigaspis lepidophora
                    - - Eskimaspis heintzi
                      - - Baringaspis dineleyi
                        - Proaethaspis ohioensis
                      - - Anarthraspis chamberlini
                        - Heightingtonaspis anglica
                        - Phyllolepida
                          - Gavinaspis convergens
                          - - Austrophyllolepis sp.
                            - Cowralepis mclachlani
                            - Phyllolepis orvini
                            - Placolepis budawangensis
            - - Actinolepidae
                - Bollandaspis woschmidti
                - - Actinolepis spinosa
                  - - Actinolepis magna
                    - Actinolepis tuberculata
              - - Bryantolepis brachycephalus
                - Phlyctaenioidei
                  - Phlyctaeniidae
                  - - - Groenlandaspidae
                      - - Arctaspidae
                          Dicksonosteus arcticus
                        - Arctolepidae
                    - Brachythoraci
