= Anarthraspis =

Anarthraspis Temporal range: Early Devonian, 419–393 Ma

Scientific classification
- Kingdom: Animalia
- Phylum: Chordata
- Class: †Placodermi
- Order: †Arthrodira
- Genus: †Anarthraspis; Bryant, 1934

Species
- †Anarthraspis chamberlini Bryant, 1932 (type); †Anarthraspis montanus Bryant, 1932

Extinct genus of placoderm fishes

Anarthraspis is an extinct genus of arthrodire placoderm fishes which lived during the Early Devonian period. It contains two species described in 1932, Anarthraspis chamberlini and Anarthraspis montanus, both found in the Beartooth Butte Formation of Wyoming and Montana, USA, and assigned to the genus in 1934.

The type species, Anarthraspis chamberlini, was a contemporary of the placoderm Bryantolepis. The specific epithet, chamberlini, honours British Prime Minister Neville Chamberlain.

Anarthraspis is one of the more basal members of the order Arthrodira, as shown in the cladogram below:

- - Eurycaraspis incilis
  - Lunaspis broilii
  - Arthrodira
    - Yujiangolepis liujingensis
    - - Antarctaspis mcmurdoensis
      - - Wuttagoonaspidae
          - Wuttagoonaspis fletcheri
          - Yiminaspis shenme
        - - - Aethaspis major
            - Aethaspis utahensis
          - - - Lehmanosteus hyperboreus
              - - - Aleosteus eganensis
                  - Simblaspis cachensis
                - - - Kujdanowiaspis buczacziensis
                    - Kujdanowiaspis podolica
                  - - - Erikaspis zychi
                      - Sigaspis lepidophora
                    - - Eskimaspis heintzi
                      - - Baringaspis dineleyi
                        - Proaethaspis ohioensis
                      - - Anarthraspis chamberlini
                        - Heightingtonaspis anglica
                        - Phyllolepida
                          - Gavinaspis convergens
                          - - Austrophyllolepis sp.
                            - Cowralepis mclachlani
                            - Phyllolepis orvini
                            - Placolepis budawangensis
            - - Actinolepidae
                - Bollandaspis woschmidti
                - - Actinolepis spinosa
                  - - Actinolepis magna
                    - Actinolepis tuberculata
              - - Bryantolepis brachycephalus
                - Phlyctaenioidei
                  - Phlyctaeniidae
                  - - - Groenlandaspidae
                      - - Arctaspidae
                          Dicksonosteus arcticus
                        - Arctolepidae
                    - Brachythoraci
