= Heightingtonaspis =

Heightingtonaspis Temporal range: Early - Middle Devonian, 419–382 Ma

Scientific classification
- Domain: Eukaryota
- Kingdom: Animalia
- Phylum: Chordata
- Class: †Placodermi
- Order: †Arthrodira
- Genus: †Heightingtonaspis; White, 1969

Species
- †Heightingtonaspis anglica (Traquair, 1890) (type); †Heightingtonaspis clarkei (Eastman, 1907); †Heightingtonaspis willsi (White, 1961)

Synonyms
- Kujdanowiaspis clarkei Eastman, 1907; Kujdanowiaspis willsi White, 1961; Phlyctaenius anglicus Traquair, 1890

Genus of extinct fish

Heightingtonaspis is an extinct genus of primitive arthrodire placoderm fish from the Devonian period in Great Britain, and currently contains three species.

The type species Heightingtonaspis anglica was described by Ramsay Traquair in 1890, and was initially named Phlyctaenius anglicus. The holotype specimen NHMUK PAL PV P 29417 was first discovered on the surface at the Old Red Sandstone supergroup, Shropshire, England and the fossils were radiocarbon dated in situ to 416 million years old. it has also been found in the Senni Beds of Wales.

Heightingtonaspis clarkei was described by Charles R. Eastman in 1907, and was originally named Kujdanowiaspis clarkei. It was later revised and reassigned to the genus Heightingtonaspis by Denison in 1978.

Heightingtonaspis willsi was described by White in 1961, and was originally named Kujdanowiaspis willsi, but was later reassigned to the genus Heightingtonaspis, which was created in 1969 by White. H. willsi was discovered in the same location as H. anglica, in Shropshire, England.

Heightingtonaspis is one of the more basal members of the order Arthrodira, as shown in the cladogram below:

- - Eurycaraspis incilis
  - Lunaspis broilii
  - Arthrodira
    - Yujiangolepis liujingensis
    - - Antarctaspis mcmurdoensis
      - - Wuttagoonaspidae
          - Wuttagoonaspis fletcheri
          - Yiminaspis shenme
        - - - Aethaspis major
            - Aethaspis utahensis
          - - - Lehmanosteus hyperboreus
              - - - Aleosteus eganensis
                  - Simblaspis cachensis
                - - - Kujdanowiaspis buczacziensis
                    - Kujdanowiaspis podolica
                  - - - Erikaspis zychi
                      - Sigaspis lepidophora
                    - - Eskimaspis heintzi
                      - - Baringaspis dineleyi
                        - Proaethaspis ohioensis
                      - - Anarthraspis chamberlini
                        - Heightingtonaspis anglica
                        - Phyllolepida
                          - Gavinaspis convergens
                          - - Austrophyllolepis sp.
                            - Cowralepis mclachlani
                            - Phyllolepis orvini
                            - Placolepis budawangensis
            - - Actinolepidae
                - Bollandaspis woschmidti
                - - Actinolepis spinosa
                  - - Actinolepis magna
                    - Actinolepis tuberculata
              - - Bryantolepis brachycephalus
                - Phlyctaenioidei
                  - Phlyctaeniidae
                  - - - Groenlandaspidae
                      - - Arctaspidae
                          Dicksonosteus arcticus
                        - Arctolepidae
                    - Brachythoraci
