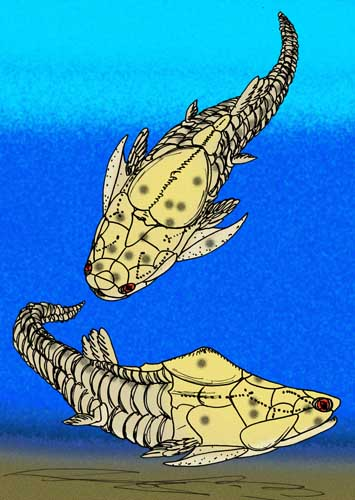

Scientific classification
- Kingdom: Animalia
- Phylum: Chordata
- Class: †Placodermi
- Order: †Arthrodira
- Genus: †Aleosteus; Johnson et al., 2000

Species
- †Aleosteus eganensis Johnson et al., 2000 (type)

= Aleosteus =

Aleosteus Temporal range: Early Devonian: Late Emsian, 407–393 Ma

Genus of extinct fish

Aleosteus is an extinct monospecific genus of arthrodire placoderm fish of the Early Devonian period. The type species Aleosteus eganensis was described in 2000, and was found in the Late Emsian strate of the Sevy Dolomite Formation, in the Egan Range of east-central Nevada, USA. Almost complete fossils belong to juvenile and adult specimens and show a short and broad skull, posteriorly concave.

== Etymology ==
The generic name Aleosteus comes from the Ancient Greco-Roman game "alea", a game of chance involving dice, as an allusion to Nevada's reputation for gambling. The species name eganensis is based on the type locality in the Egan Mountain Range in Nevada.

== Classification ==
Aleosteus is one of the more basal members of the order Arthrodira, closely related to Simblaspis, as shown in the cladogram below:

- - Eurycaraspis incilis
  - Lunaspis broilii
  - Arthrodira
    - Yujiangolepis liujingensis
    - - Antarctaspis mcmurdoensis
      - - Wuttagoonaspidae
          - Wuttagoonaspis fletcheri
          - Yiminaspis shenme
        - - - Aethaspis major
            - Aethaspis utahensis
          - - - Lehmanosteus hyperboreus
              - - - Aleosteus eganensis
                  - Simblaspis cachensis
                - - - Kujdanowiaspis buczacziensis
                    - Kujdanowiaspis podolica
                  - - - Erikaspis zychi
                      - Sigaspis lepidophora
                    - - Eskimaspis heintzi
                      - - Baringaspis dineleyi
                        - Proaethaspis ohioensis
                      - - Anarthraspis chamberlini
                        - Heightingtonaspis anglica
                        - Phyllolepida
                          - Gavinaspis convergens
                          - - Austrophyllolepis sp.
                            - Cowralepis mclachlani
                            - Phyllolepis orvini
                            - Placolepis budawangensis
            - - Actinolepidae
                - Bollandaspis woschmidti
                - - Actinolepis spinosa
                  - - Actinolepis magna
                    - Actinolepis tuberculata
              - - Bryantolepis brachycephalus
                - Phlyctaenioidei
                  - Phlyctaeniidae
                  - - - Groenlandaspidae
                      - - Arctaspidae
                          Dicksonosteus arcticus
                        - Arctolepidae
                    - Brachythoraci
