= Kujdanowiaspis =

Kujdanowiaspis Temporal range: Early Devonian, 419–393 Ma
- Artist's reconstruction of K. buczacziensis

Scientific classification
- Kingdom: Animalia
- Phylum: Chordata
- Class: †Placodermi
- Order: †Arthrodira
- Genus: †Kujdanowiaspis; Stensiö, 1942

Species
- †Kujdanowiaspis buczacziensis (Brotzen, 1934) (type); †Kujdanowiaspis podolica (Brotzen, 1934); †Kujdanowiaspis rectiformis ? (Brotzen, 1934)

Genus of extinct fish

Kujdanowiaspis is an extinct genus of arthrodire placoderm fish from the Early Devonian of Podolia (Ukraine), Poland and Spain. Kujdanowiaspis is known from many fragmentary head shields and body armours.

== Classification ==
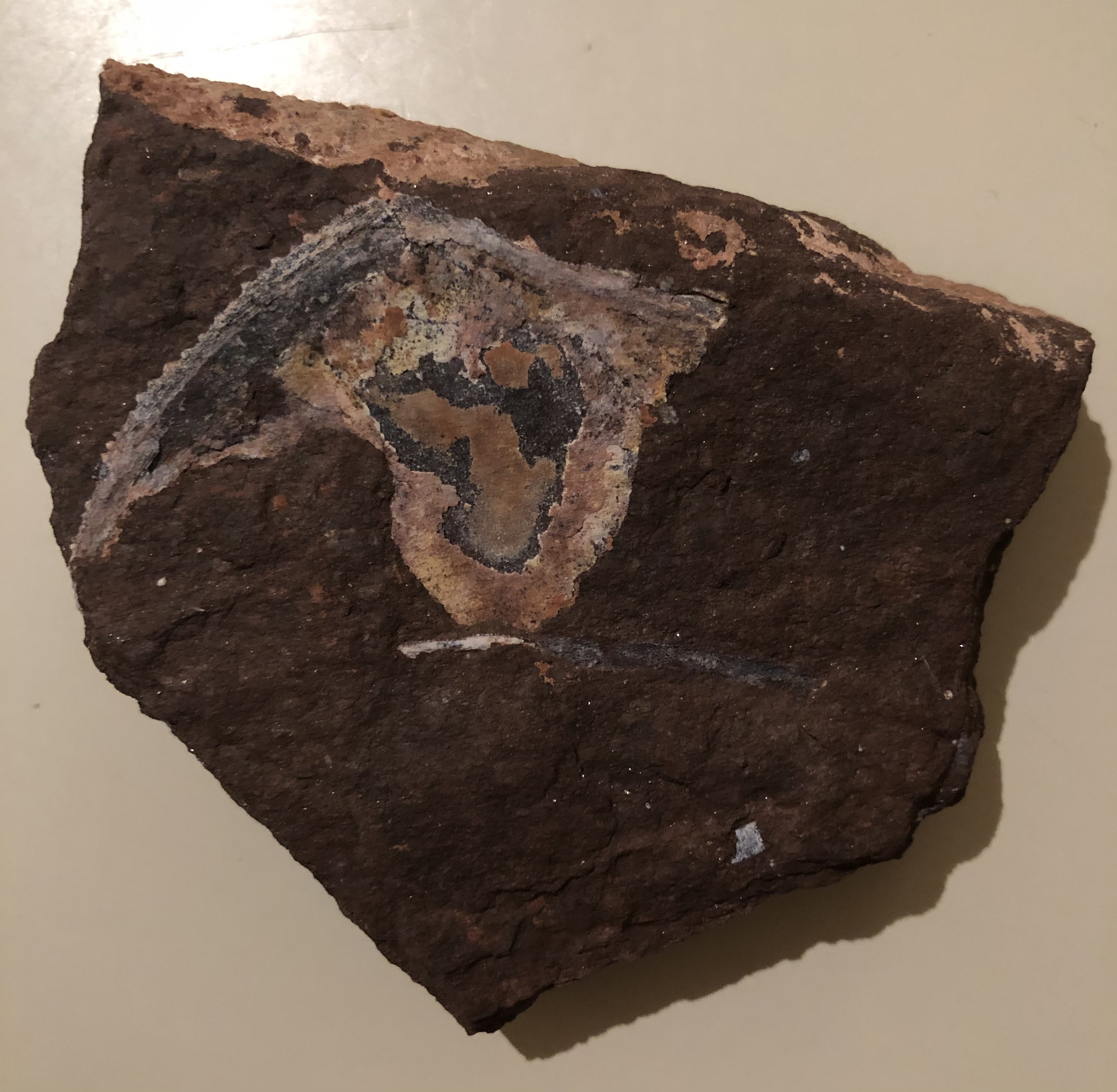
Preserved spinal plate and thoracic shield

Kujdanowiaspis consists of three species, all described in 1934: Kujdanowiaspis buczacziensis (type species), Kujdanowiapsis podolica, and Kujdanowiaspis rectiformis - although the independent status of K. rectiformis is in doubt, and is instead most likely K. podolica. Kujdanowiaspis zychi was also named and described by Stensiö in 1945, but was reassigned to the new genus Erikaspis in 2007.

Kujdanowiaspis is one of the more basal members of the order Arthrodira, as shown in the cladogram below:

- - Eurycaraspis incilis
  - Lunaspis broilii
  - Arthrodira
    - Yujiangolepis liujingensis
    - - Antarctaspis mcmurdoensis
      - - Wuttagoonaspidae
          - Wuttagoonaspis fletcheri
          - Yiminaspis shenme
        - - - Aethaspis major
            - Aethaspis utahensis
          - - - Lehmanosteus hyperboreus
              - - - Aleosteus eganensis
                  - Simblaspis cachensis
                - - - Kujdanowiaspis buczacziensis
                    - Kujdanowiaspis podolica
                  - - - Erikaspis zychi
                      - Sigaspis lepidophora
                    - - Eskimaspis heintzi
                      - - Baringaspis dineleyi
                        - Proaethaspis ohioensis
                      - - Anarthraspis chamberlini
                        - Heightingtonaspis anglica
                        - Phyllolepida
                          - Gavinaspis convergens
                          - - Austrophyllolepis sp.
                            - Cowralepis mclachlani
                            - Phyllolepis orvini
                            - Placolepis budawangensis
            - - Actinolepidae
                - Bollandaspis woschmidti
                - - Actinolepis spinosa
                  - - Actinolepis magna
                    - Actinolepis tuberculata
              - - Bryantolepis brachycephalus
                - Phlyctaenioidei
                  - Phlyctaeniidae
                  - - - Groenlandaspidae
                      - - Arctaspidae
                          Dicksonosteus arcticus
                        - Arctolepidae
                    - Brachythoraci

== Description ==
Because of the poor preservation of Kujdanowiaspis fossils, little is known about its physiology. What is known about it is typical of actinolepid placoderms, and it can compared to the better known primitive arthrodires such as Dicksonosteus or Actinolepis. It had a very pronounced, serrated spinal plate, giving it an almost lunate dorsal silhouette.

The body of Kujdanowiaspis is slightly wider than high, with large spinal plates protruding laterally, suggesting a benthic lifestyle. The body armour of the genus Erikaspis is much flatter.

Its jaws were comparatively underdeveloped in comparison to the more robust-jawed arthrodires that would come after it, such as Dunkleosteus and Coccosteus, indicating that it likely subsisted primarily on smaller, softer-bodied animals such as mollusks or worms instead of larger, tougher prey animals.
