= Lehmanosteus =

Lehmanosteus Temporal range: Early Devonian, 419–393 Ma

Scientific classification
- Kingdom: Animalia
- Phylum: Chordata
- Class: †Placodermi
- Order: †Arthrodira
- Genus: †Lehmanosteus; Goujet, 1984

Species
- †Lehmanosteus hyperboreus Goujet, 1984 (type)

Genus of extinct fish

Lehmanosteus is an extinct monospecific genus of arthrodire placoderm fish, named after French paleontologist Jean-Pierre Lehman. The type species Lehmanosteus hyperboreus was described in 1984, and was found in Early Devonian strata of the Wood Bay Formation on the island of Spitsbergen, Svalbard in Norway.

It is one of the more basal members of the order Arthrodira, as shown in the cladogram below:

- - Eurycaraspis incilis
  - Lunaspis broilii
  - Arthrodira
    - Yujiangolepis liujingensis
    - - Antarctaspis mcmurdoensis
      - - Wuttagoonaspidae
          - Wuttagoonaspis fletcheri
          - Yiminaspis shenme
        - - - Aethaspis major
            - Aethaspis utahensis
          - - - Lehmanosteus hyperboreus
              - - - Aleosteus eganensis
                  - Simblaspis cachensis
                - - - Kujdanowiaspis buczacziensis
                    - Kujdanowiaspis podolica
                  - - - Erikaspis zychi
                      - Sigaspis lepidophora
                    - - Eskimaspis heintzi
                      - - Baringaspis dineleyi
                        - Proaethaspis ohioensis
                      - - Anarthraspis chamberlini
                        - Heightingtonaspis anglica
                        - Phyllolepida
                          - Gavinaspis convergens
                          - - Austrophyllolepis sp.
                            - Cowralepis mclachlani
                            - Phyllolepis orvini
                            - Placolepis budawangensis
            - - Actinolepidae
                - Bollandaspis woschmidti
                - - Actinolepis spinosa
                  - - Actinolepis magna
                    - Actinolepis tuberculata
              - - Bryantolepis brachycephalus
                - Phlyctaenioidei
                  - Phlyctaeniidae
                  - - - Groenlandaspidae
                      - - Arctaspidae
                          Dicksonosteus arcticus
                        - Arctolepidae
                    - Brachythoraci
