= Murmur arctatum =

Murmur arctatum Temporal range: Early Devonian

Scientific classification
- Kingdom: Animalia
- Phylum: Chordata
- Class: †Placodermi
- Order: †Arthrodira
- Family: †incertae sedis
- Genus: †Murmur; Whitley, 1951
- Species: †M. arctatum

Binomial name
- †Murmur arctatum (Bryant 1935)

Synonyms
- Euptychaspis White & Moy-Thomas, 1941; Euptychaspis arctatus White & Moy-Thomas, 1941; Ptychaspis Bryant 1935; Ptychaspis arctatus Bryant 1935

Extinct species of placoderm

Murmur is a genus of placoderm. The type species is Murmur arctatum. It was described from a fossil found within the Beartooth Butte Formation of Wyoming.
