= Actinolepis =

Actinolepis is the scientific name of two genera of organisms and may refer to:

- Actinolepis (plant), a genus of plants in the family Asteraceae, currently considered a synonym of Eriophyllum
- Actinolepis (placoderm), a genus of prehistoric fish in the family Actinolepidae
