= Beartooth Butte Formation =

Geologic formation in Wyoming, United States

- Stratigraphic range: Lochkovian-Emsian; ~419–394 Ma
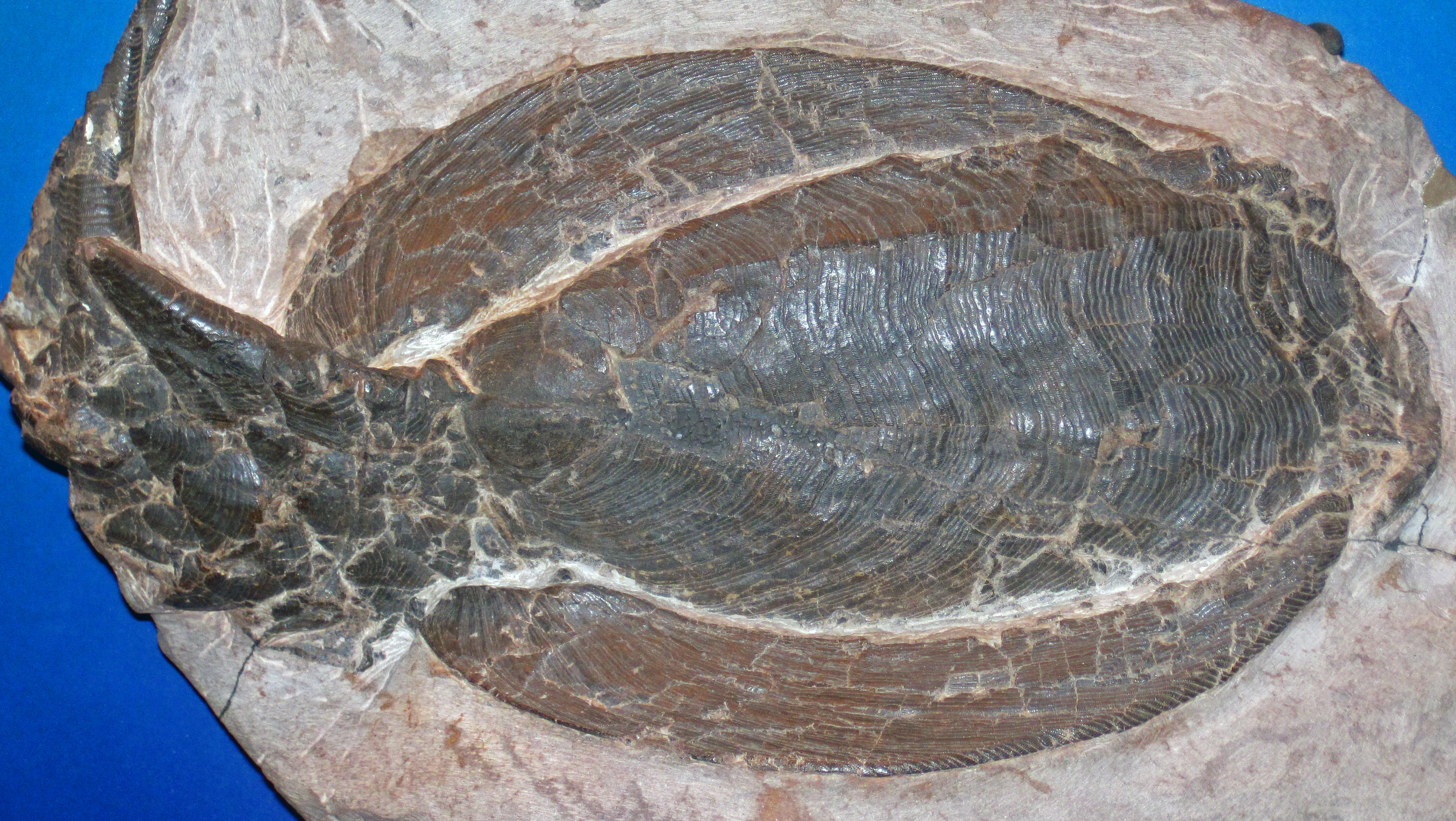
- Fossil fish from the Beartooth Butte Formation
- Type: Formation
- Sub-units: Cottonwood Canyon Member

Lithology
- Primary: Mudstone, sandstone
- Other: Shale, limestone

Location
- Coordinates: 44°57′N 109°37′W
- Approximate paleocoordinates: 28.2°S 47.1°W
- Region: Wyoming
- Country: United States

Type section
- Named for: Beartooth Butte
- Beartooth Butte Formation (the United States) Beartooth Butte Formation (Wyoming)

The Beartooth Butte Formation is a geologic formation in Wyoming. It preserves fossils dating back to the Devonian period.

== Description ==
The formation contains a basal limestone conglomerate overlain by evenly bedded red or gray limestones (more accurately, limy mudstones) and calcareous shales. It is a lenticular, channel-fill deposit which is some 2,500 feet (760 m) wide and 250 feet (76 m) thick at maximum. Most collections are from the talus slope. Stable oxygen and isotope data (Poulson in Fiorillo, 2000) indicate that the Beartooth Butte Formation was deposited in an estuarine environment, with the Cottonwood Canyon section being slightly less saline than the type section.

== Fossil content ==
The following fossils have been reported from the formation:

Fish

- Allocryptaspis ellipticus
- A. flabelliformis
- Anarthraspis chamberlini
- A. montanus
- Bryantolepis brachycephalus
- B. cristatus
- Bryantolepis major
- B. obscurus
- Bulbocanthus rugosus
- Cardipeltis bryanti
- C. richardoni
- Cosmaspis transversa
- Lampraspis tuberculata
- Machaeracanthus minor
- Onchus penetrans
- O. peracutus
- Protaspis brevispina
- P. mcgrewi
- Uranolophus wyomingensis
- Aethaspis sp.
- Cephalaspis sp.
- Simblaspis sp.

Arthropods

- Acanthoscorpio mucronatus
- Branchioscorpio richardsoni
- Hydroscorpius denisoni
- Praearcturus sp.

Flora

- Psilophyton wyomingense
- Drepanophycus devonicus
- Euphyllophytina sp.
- Gosslingia sp.

Invertebrates

- Brachiopoda indet.

== See also ==
- List of fossiliferous stratigraphic units in Wyoming
- Paleontology in Wyoming
