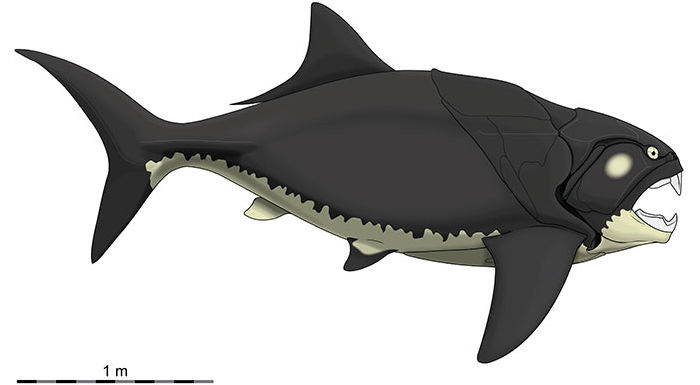
- Modern reconstruction of the arthrodire placoderm Dunkleosteus terrelli
- Dicksonosteus

Scientific classification
- Kingdom: Animalia
- Phylum: Chordata
- Infraphylum: Gnathostomata
- Class: †Placodermi
- Order: †Arthrodira; Woodward, 1891

Subgroups
- Phlyctaenioidei; Brachythoraci; Williamsaspididae; Groenlandaspididae; Arctolepididae; Phlyctaeniidae; Actinolepidae; Phyllolepida; Wuttagoonaspidae; Genera incertae sedis; see text for list

= Arthrodira =

Arthrodira Temporal range: Devonian, 419.2–358.9 Ma

Extinct order of fishes

Arthrodira (Greek for "jointed neck") is an order of extinct armored, jawed fishes of the class Placodermi that flourished in the Devonian period before their sudden extinction, surviving for about 50 million years and penetrating most marine ecological niches. Arthrodires were the largest and most diverse of all groups of placoderms.

== Description ==
Arthrodire placoderms are notable for the movable joint between armor surrounding their heads and bodies. Like all placoderms, they lacked distinct teeth; instead, they used the sharpened edges of a bony plate on their jawbone as a biting surface. The eye sockets are covered by a bony ring, which supports the eye, a feature shared by many fish and reptiles. Early arthrodires, such as the genus Arctolepis, were well-armoured fishes with flattened bodies. The largest member of this group, Dunkleosteus, was a true superpredator of the latest Devonian period, reaching as much as 4 m in length, according to a major recent study. In contrast, the long-nosed Rolfosteus measured just 15 cm. Fossils of Incisoscutum have been found containing unborn fetuses, indicating that arthrodires gave birth to live young.

A common misconception is the arthrodires (along with all other placoderms) were sluggish bottom-dwellers that were outcompeted by more advanced fish. Leading to this misconception is that the arthrodire body plan remained relatively conserved (that is, the majority of arthrodires were bullet- or torpedo-shaped) during the Devonian period, save for increasing in size. However, during their reign, the arthrodires were one of the most diverse and numerically successful, if not the most successful, vertebrate orders of the Devonian, occupying a vast spectrum of roles from apex predator to detritus-nibbling bottom dweller. Despite their success, the arthrodires were one of many groups eliminated by the environmental catastrophes of the Late Devonian extinction, allowing other fish such as sharks to diversify into the vacated ecological niches during the Carboniferous period.

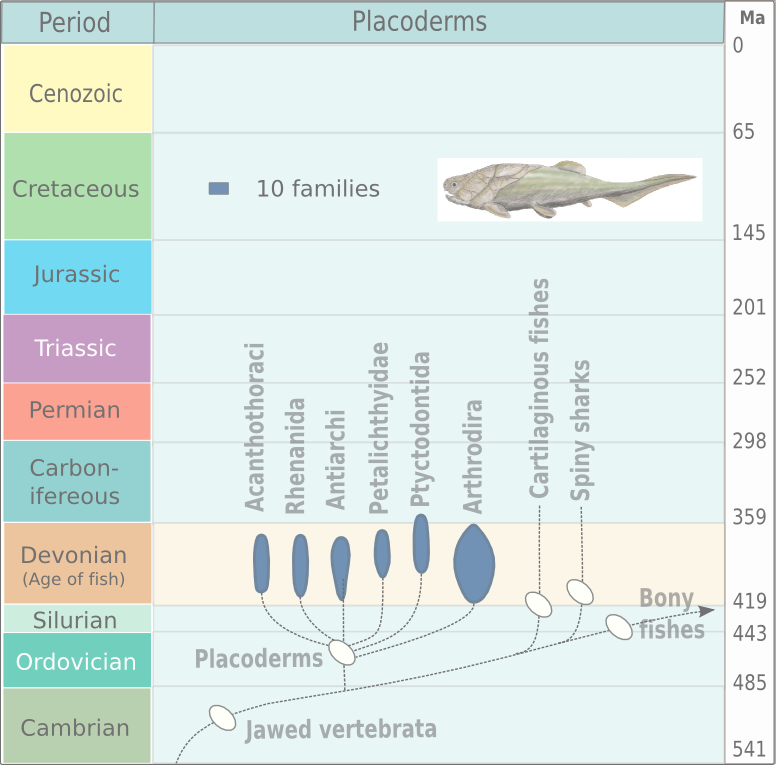
Evolution and extinction of placoderms. The diagram is based on Michael Benton, 2005.

== Phylogeny ==
The order Arthrodira belongs to the class Placodermi, the large group of extinct prehistoric armored fish that is thought to have diverged over 400 million years ago from all sharks and bony fishes (and thus also all subsequent tetrapods, including mammals, birds, reptiles and amphibians). However, recent phylogenetic studies have found Placodermi to be paraphyletic, and rather an evolutionary grade towards Eugnathostomata, the clade grouping that contains sharks, bony fish, and all tetrapods.

Arthrodira was traditionally divided into the paraphyletic Actinolepida, the Phlyctaenii (now also paraphyletic), and the Brachythoraci. Phylogenetic studies have since found two of those groups as paraphyletic, as shown in the cladogram below, from Dupret et al. (2009).

- - Eurycaraspis incilis
  - Lunaspis broilii
  - Arthrodira
    - Yujiangolepis liujingensis
    - - Antarctaspis mcmurdoensis
      - - Wuttagoonaspidae
          - Wuttagoonaspis fletcheri
          - Yiminaspis shenme
        - - - Aethaspis major
            - Aethaspis utahensis
          - - - Lehmanosteus hyperboreus
              - - - Aleosteus eganensis
                  - Simblaspis cachensis
                - - - Kujdanowiaspis buczacziensis
                    - Kujdanowiaspis podolica
                  - - - Erikaspis zychi
                      - Sigaspis lepidophora
                    - - Eskimaspis heintzi
                      - - Baringaspis dineleyi
                        - Proaethaspis ohioensis
                      - - Anarthraspis chamberlini
                        - Heightingtonaspis anglica
                        - Phyllolepida
                          - Gavinaspis convergens
                          - - Austrophyllolepis sp.
                            - Cowralepis mclachlani
                            - Phyllolepis orvini
                            - Placolepis budawangensis
            - - Actinolepidae
                - Bollandaspis woschmidti
                - - Actinolepis spinosa
                  - - Actinolepis magna
                    - Actinolepis tuberculata
              - - Bryantolepis brachycephalus
                - Phlyctaenioidei
                  - Phlyctaeniidae
                    - Pageauaspis russelli
                    - Phlyctaenius acadicus
                  - - - Groenlandaspidae
                        - Groenlandaspis antarctica
                        - Tiaraspis subilis
                      - - Arctaspidae
                          Dicksonosteus arcticus
                        - Arctolepidae
                          - Arctolepis decipiens
                          - Heintzosteus brevis
                    - Brachythoraci
                      - Antineosteus lehmani
                      - - Buchanosteus confertituberculatus
                        - Coccosteus cuspidatus

== Classification ==
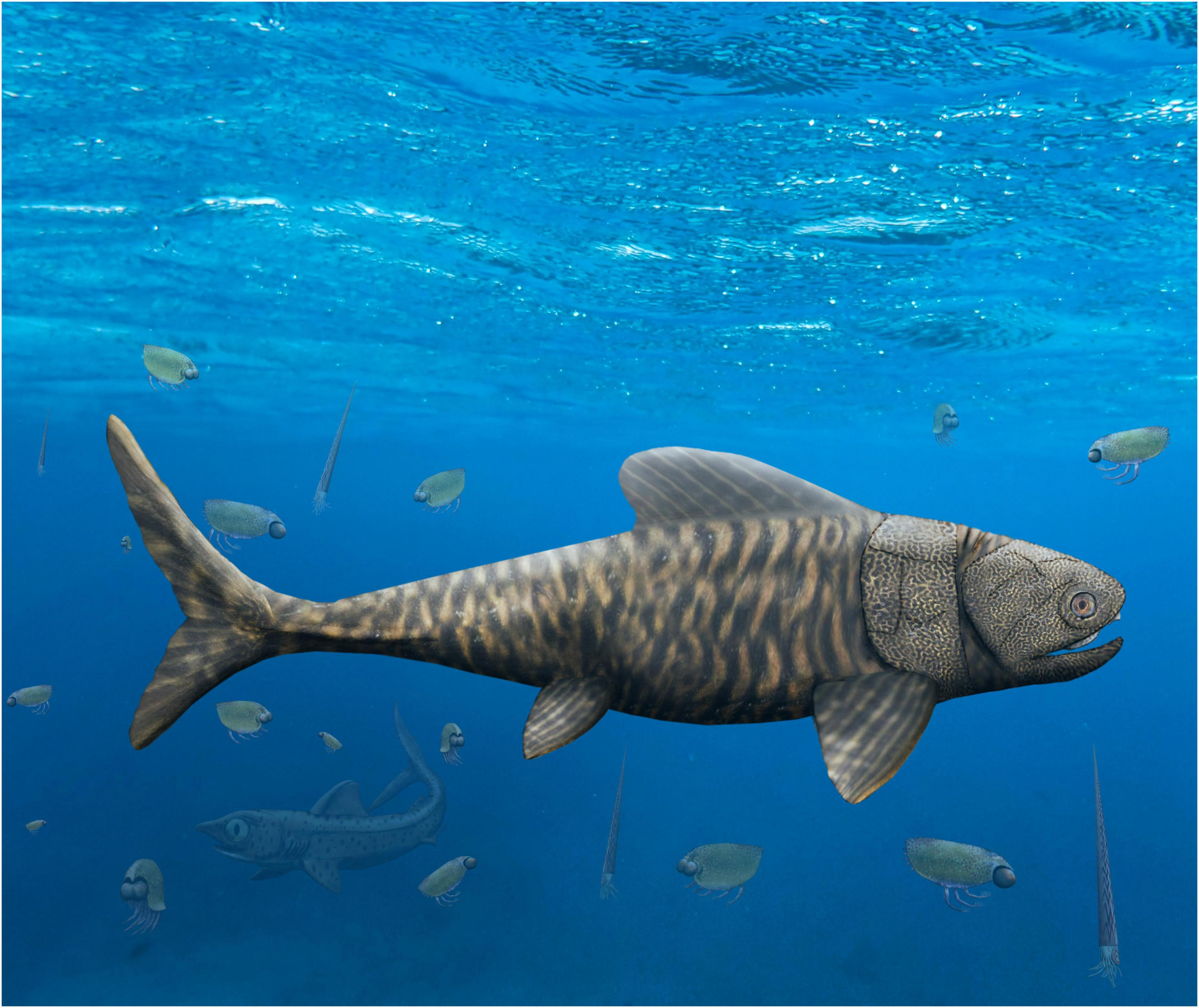
The pelagic selenosteid Amazichthys trinajsticae

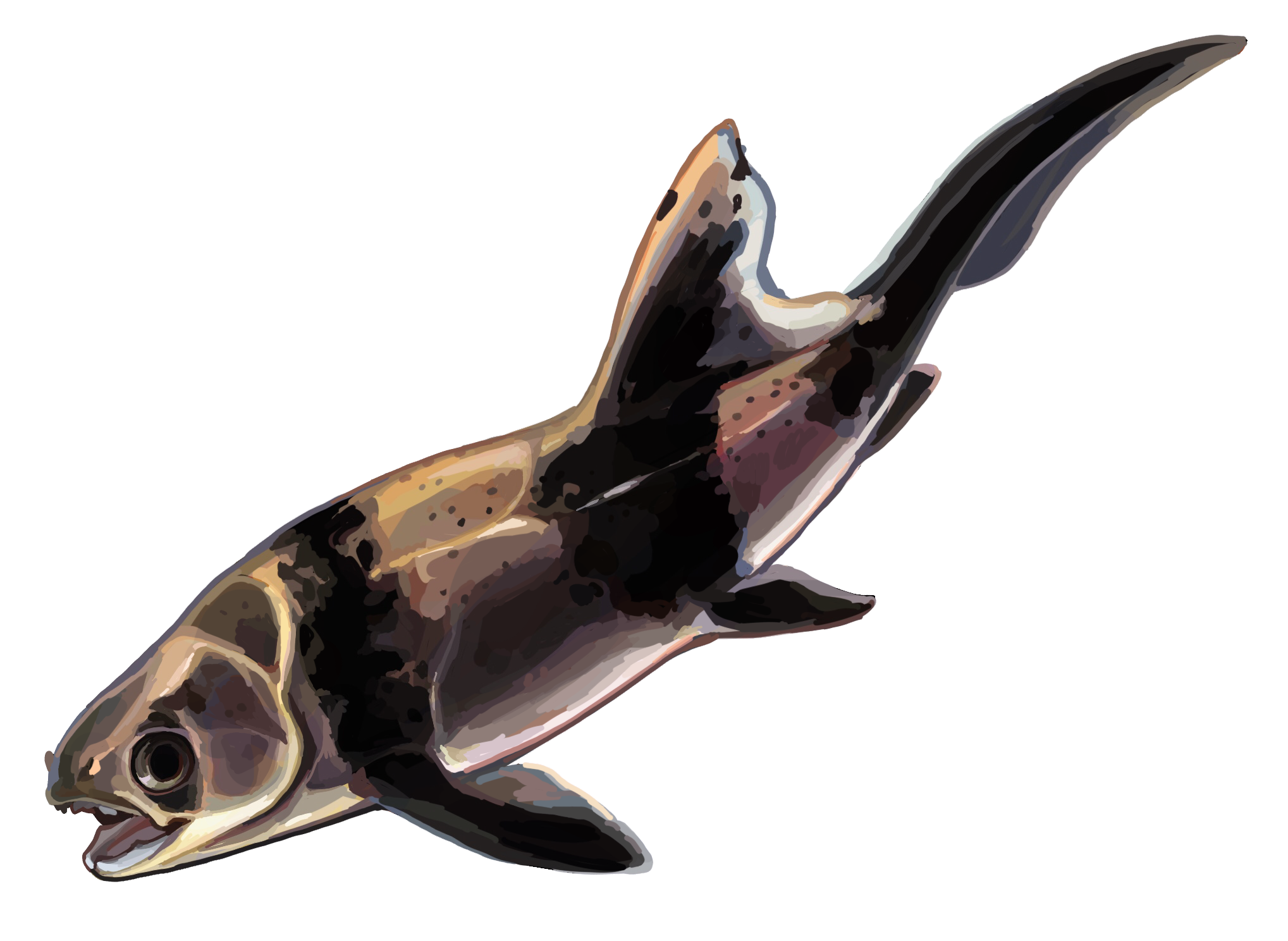
Artist's reconstruction of the arthrodire placoderm Coccosteus cuspidatus

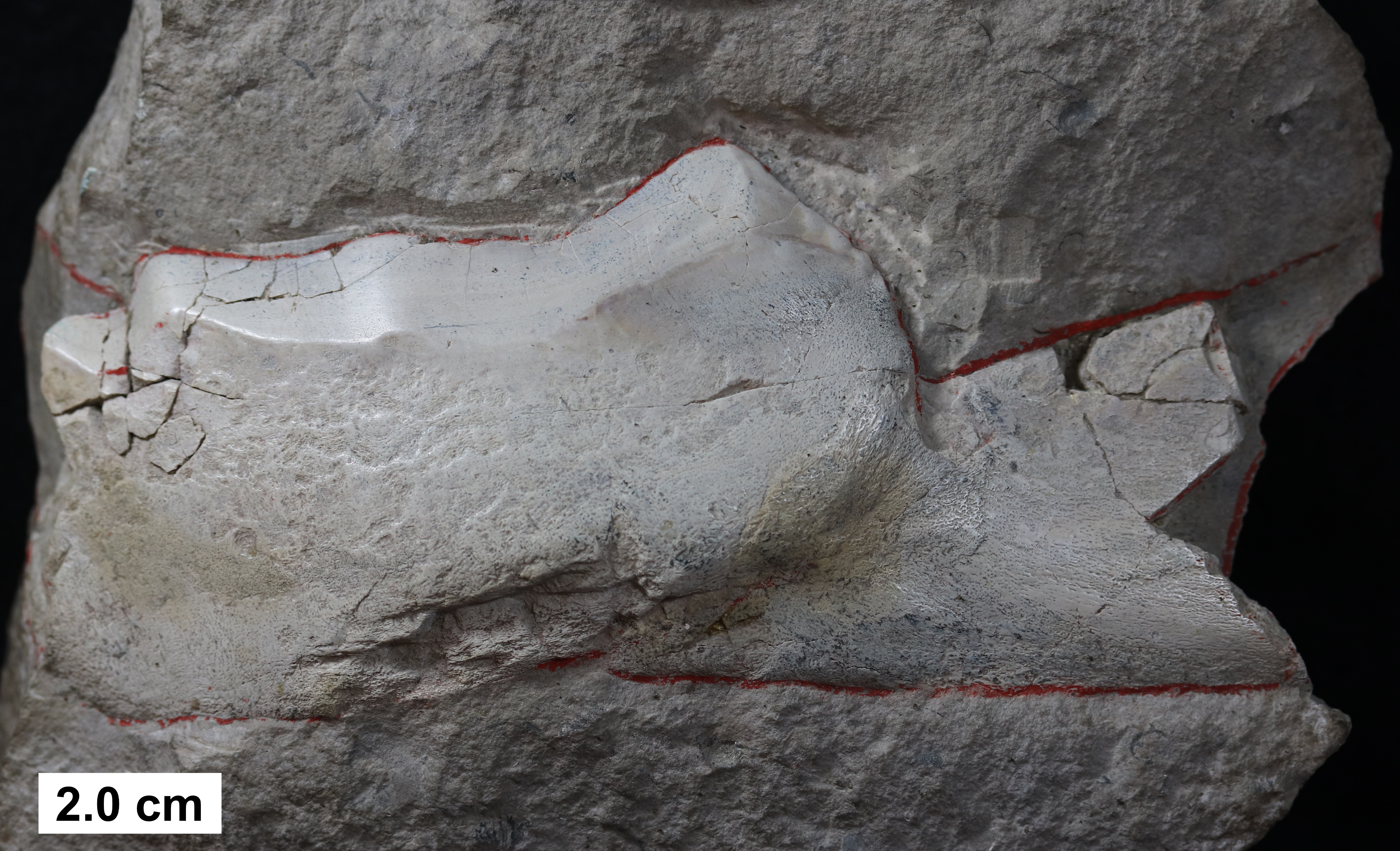
Lower jaw plate of Eastmanosteus pustulosus from the Middle Devonian of Wisconsin

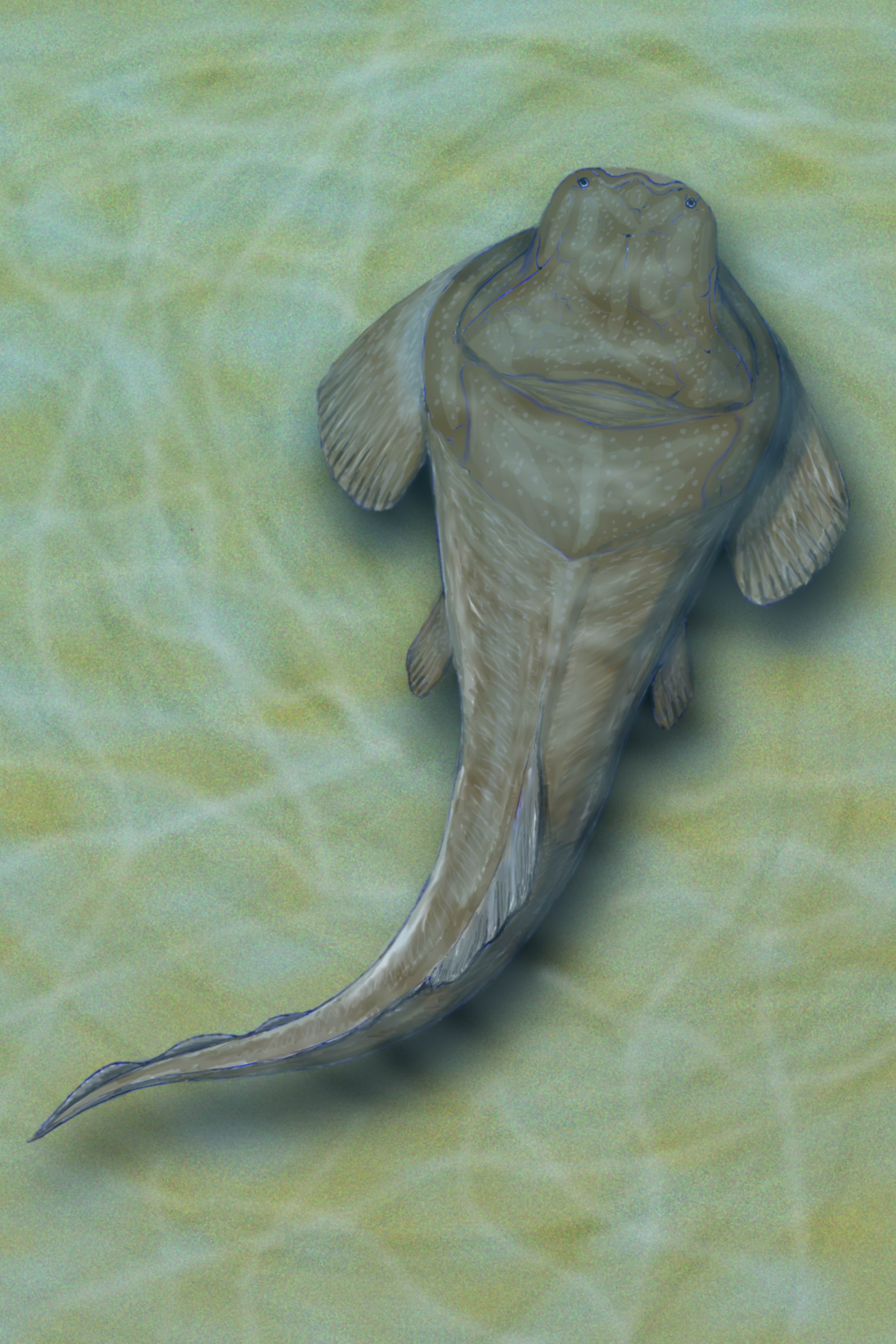
Heterosteus ingens from the Middle Devonian of Estonia

Order Arthrodira Woodward, 1891

- Phlyctaenioidei Miles, 1973
  - Brachythoraci Gross, 1932 (includes the well-known Dunkleosteus, Dinichthys, etc.)
  - Williamsaspididae White, 1952
  - Groenlandaspididae Obruchev, 1964
  - Arctolepididae Heintz, 1937
  - Phlyctaeniidae Fowler, 1947
- Actinolepidae Gross, 1940
- Phyllolepida Stensiö 1934
- Wuttagoonaspidae Ritchie 1973
- Genera incertae sedis
  - Aethaspis Denison, 1958 (may be within Actinolepidae)
  - Aleosteus Johnson et al., 2000 (may be within Actinolepidae)
  - Anarthraspis Bryant, 1934 (may be within Actinolepidae)
  - Antarctaspis White, 1968 (previously within Antarctaspididae)
  - Antarctolepis White, 1968
  - Aspidichthys Newberry, 1873
  - Baringaspis Miles, 1973 (may be within Actinolepidae)
  - Bryantolepis Denison, 1958 (may be within Actinolepidae)
  - Callognathus Newberry, 1890
  - Copanognathus Hussakof & Bryant, 1920
  - Carolowilhelmina Mark-Kurik & Carls, 2002
  - Diplognathus Newberry, 1878
  - Erikaspis Dupret, Goujet, & Mark-Kurik, 2007
  - Eskimaspis Dineley & Yuhai, 1984
  - Glyptaspis Newberry, 1890
  - Grazosteus Gross, 1958
  - Heightingtonaspis White, 1969 (may be within Actinolepidae)
  - Hollardosteus Lehman, 1956
  - Kujdanowiaspis Stensiö, 1942 (may be within Actinolepidae)
  - Lataspis Strand, 1932 (may be within Actinolepidae)
  - Laurentaspis Pageau, 1969
  - Lehmanosteus Goujet, 1984 (may be within Actinolepidae)
  - Machaerognathus Hussakof & Bryant, 1919
  - Maideria Lelièvre, 1995
  - Mediaspis Heintz, 1929 (may be within Actinolepidae)
  - Murmur Whitley, 1951
  - Overtonaspis White, 1961
  - Phylactaenium Heintz, 1934
  - Pinguosteus Long, 1990 (may be within Brachythoraci)
  - Prescottaspis White, 1961
  - Proaethaspis Denison, 1978 (may be within Actinolepidae)
  - Qataraspis White, 1969
  - Sigaspis Goujet, 1973 (may be within Actinolepidae)
  - Simblaspis Denison, 1958 (may be within Actinolepidae)
  - Taunaspis Schmidt, 1933
  - Timanosteus Obrucheva, 1962
  - Trachosteus Newberry, 18903 (may be within Coccosteidae)
  - Wheathillaspis White, 1961
  - Yujiangolepis Wang & Dupret, 2009 (previously within Antarctaspididae)
