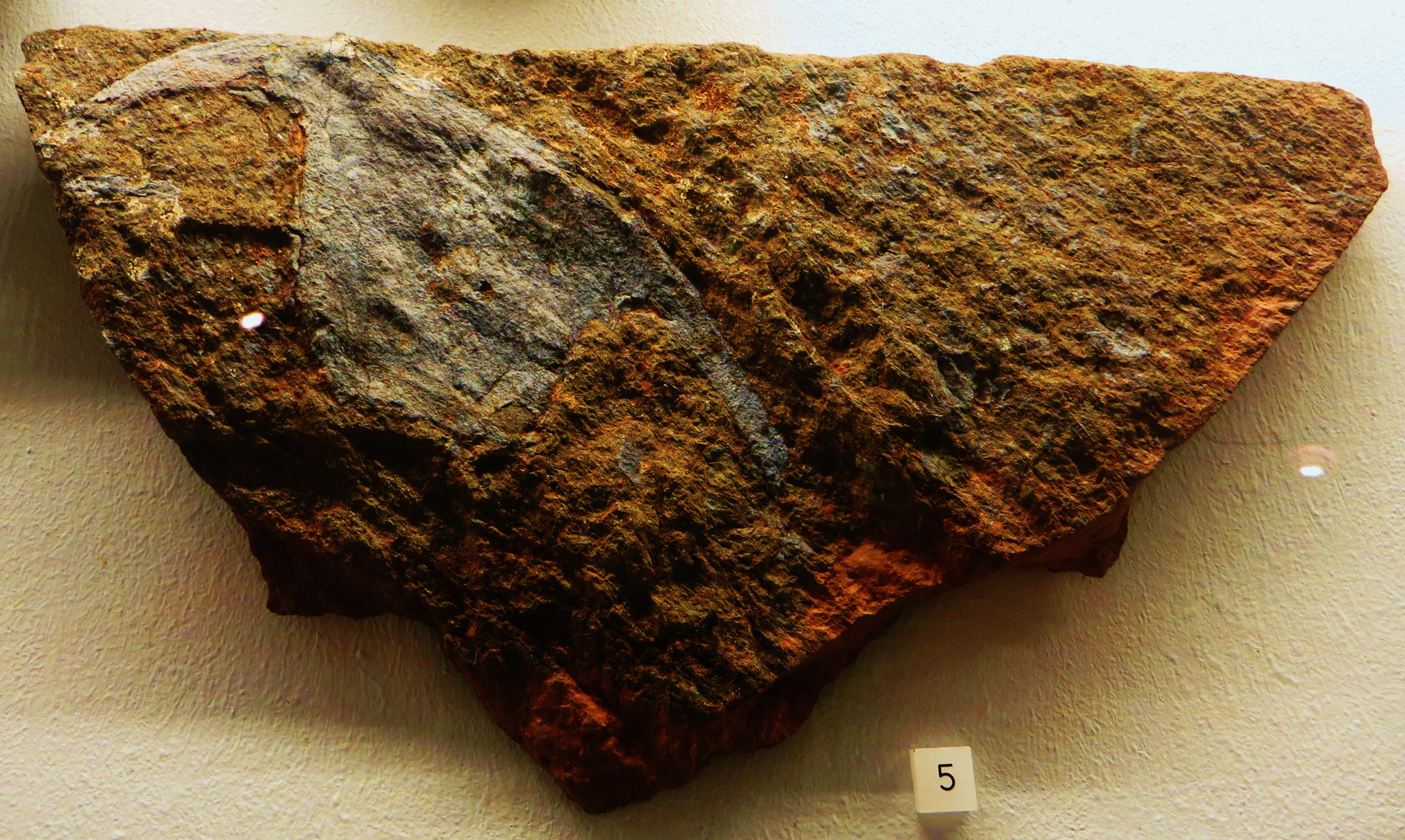
- Fossil of Arctolepis at the Museum of Paleontology of Tuebingen

Scientific classification
- Domain: Eukaryota
- Kingdom: Animalia
- Phylum: Chordata
- Class: †Placodermi
- Order: †Arthrodira
- Clade: †Phlyctaenioidei
- Family: †Arctolepididae
- Genus: †Arctolepis; Eastman, 1908

Species
- †Arctolepis brevis Heintz, 1929; †Arctolepis decipiens Woodward, 1891; †Arctolepis lata Heintz, 1929; †Arctolepis lewini Heintz 1929; †Arctolepis longicornis Heintz 1929; †Arctolepis solnoerdali Heintz 1929

= Arctolepis =

Arctolepis Temporal range: Early Devonian

Extinct genus of fishes

Arctolepis is an extinct genus of placoderm arthrodire fish which lived during the Early Devonian period (408 – 307 million years ago). Fossils of Arctolepis have been found in what is now Norway and Michigan.

== Classification ==
Within Arthrodira, Arctolepis is considered a member of "Phylctaenii", a paraphyletic grouping within the clade Phlyctaenioidei, basal to the suborder Brachythoraci. Arctolepis is most closely related to Heintzosteus and Dicksonosteus.

Arctolepis contains the following six species:

- †Arctolepis brevis Heintz, 1929
- †Arctolepis decipiens Woodward, 1891
- †Arctolepis lata Heintz, 1929
- †Arctolepis lewini Heintz, 1929
- †Arctolepis longicornis Heintz, 1929
- †Arctolepis solnoerdali Heintz, 1929
