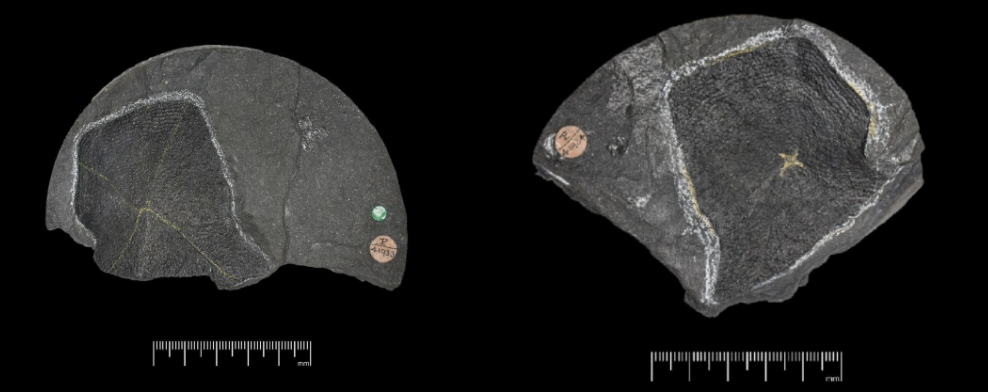
- NHMUK PV P41933 (left) and NHMUK PV P41934 (right)

Scientific classification
- Kingdom: Animalia
- Phylum: Chordata
- Class: †Placodermi
- Order: †Arthrodira
- Family: †Arctolepididae
- Genus: †Qataraspis; White, 1969

Type species
- †Qataraspis deprofundis White, 1969

= Qataraspis =

Qataraspis Temporal range: Late Devonian

Extinct genus of primitive arthrodire placoderm

Qataraspis (meaning "Qatar shield") is an extinct genus of primitive arthrodire placoderm that lived sometime around the Late Devonian in what is now Qatar. The type species is Q. deprofundis.

== Discovery and naming ==
The holotype, NHMUK PV P41933 and NHMUK PV P41934 (an almost complete right anterior lateral plate), was discovered during the 1950s in Qatar by the Iraq Petroleum Company within the 4.5 inches (11 cm) wide borehole DK 68 at a depth of 3,828 metres (12,559 ft), making it the deepest known occurrence of a fossil vertebrate to date. The holotype was sent to England to be studied and Qataraspis deprofundis was named and described by White (1969).

Casts of the holotype also exist, under specimen numbers PV P 75116 and PV P 75117.

== Classification ==
White (1969) classified Qataraspis as a basal member of the Arthrodira. This classification was followed through by Denison (1978) in a review of the Placodermi, where it was placed in the Arctolepididae.
