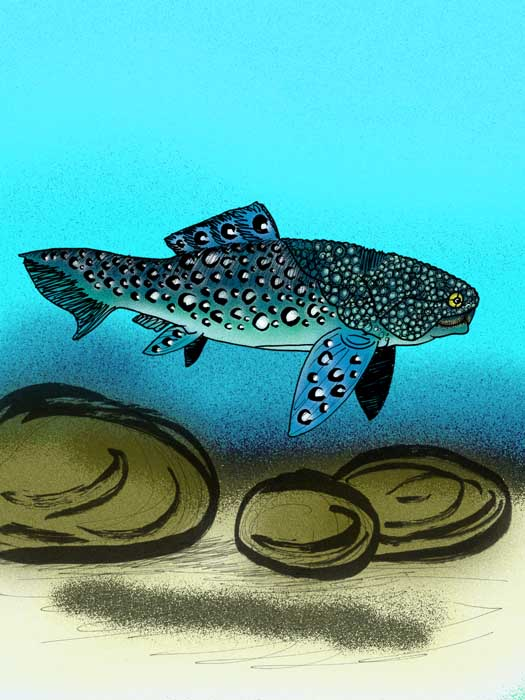
- reconstruction as a dunkleosteid

Scientific classification
- Kingdom: Animalia
- Phylum: Chordata
- Class: †Placodermi
- Order: †Arthrodira
- Suborder: †Brachythoraci
- Genus: †Hollardosteus
- Species: †H. marocanus

Binomial name
- †Hollardosteus marocanus Lehman, 1976

= Hollardosteus =

Hollardosteus Temporal range: Eifelian

Hollardosteus marocanus is a brachythoracid arthrodire placoderm from the Middle Devonian of Morocco. Its scrappy remains were found in Eifelian-aged strata from the Tafilat-Maider Valley.

The inferognathal plate has a well-developed anterior tooth (prong), very similar in form to the inferognathals of the dunkleosteids. However, the dermal surface of the armor is decorated with a pattern of large, crowded tubercules totally unlike the smooth dermal surfaces of dunkleosteid armors. This mix of peculiar features leaves H. marocanus placed as "Arthrodira incertae sedis," at least until more complete specimens are found.
