= Heintzosteus =

Heintzosteus Temporal range: Late Devonian

Scientific classification
- Kingdom: Animalia
- Phylum: Chordata
- Class: †Placodermi
- Order: †Arthrodira
- Clade: †Phlyctaenioidei
- Family: †Arctolepididae
- Genus: †Heintzosteus; Goujet, 1984

Type species
- †Heintzosteus brevis (Heintz, 1929)

Synonyms
- Arctolepis brevis Heintz, 1929

Extinct genus of fishes

Heintzosteus is an extinct genus of placoderm arthrodire fish, which lived during the Late Devonian period in Spitsbergen, Norway.

Within Arthrodira, Heintzosteus is considered a member of "Phylctaenii", a paraphyletic grouping within the clade Phlyctaenioidei, basal to the suborder Brachythoraci. Heintzosteus is most closely related to Arctolepis and Dicksonosteus.
