= Beartooth Butte =

Mountain in Wyoming, United States

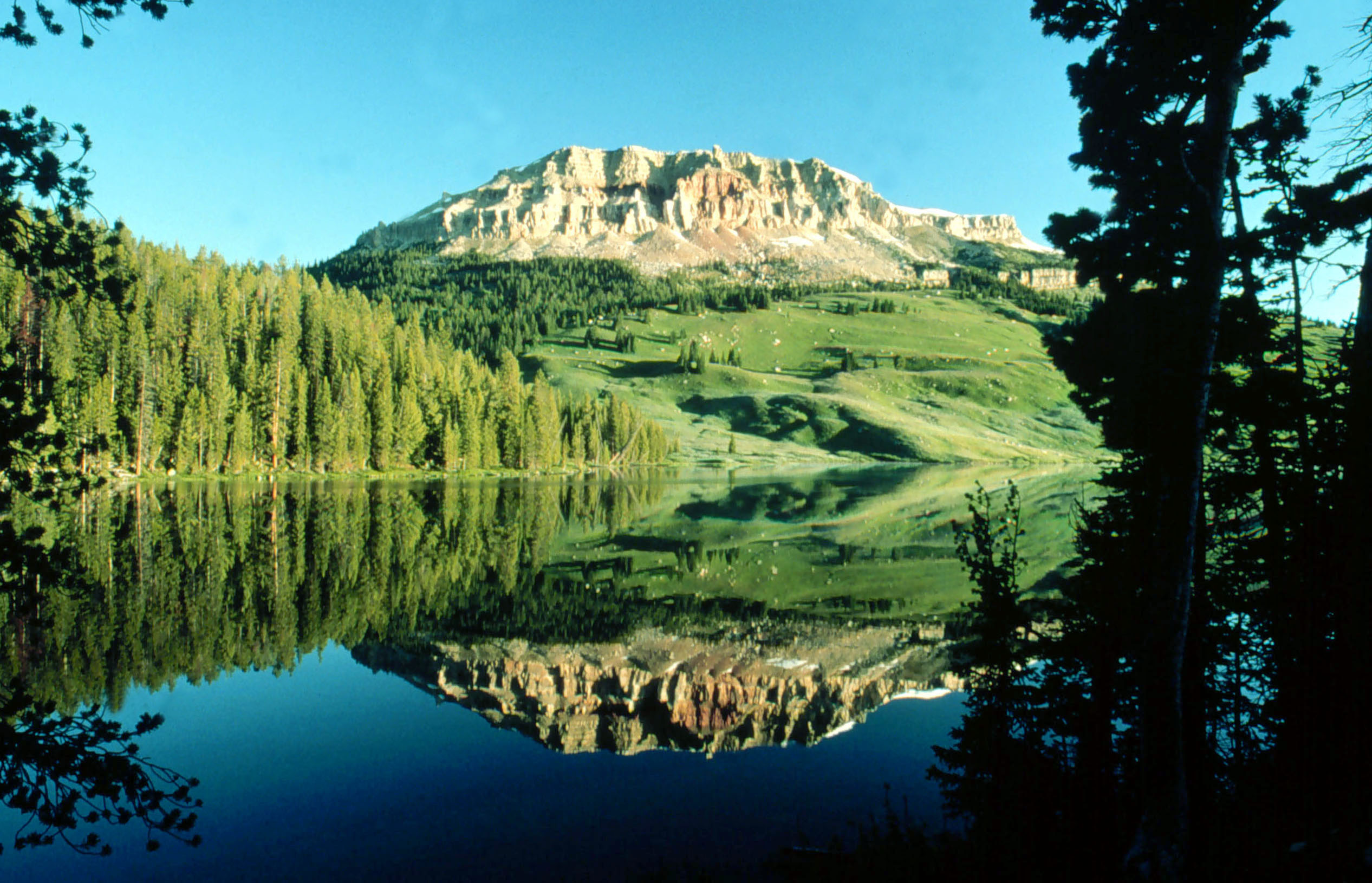
- Beartooth Butte above Beartooth Lake

Highest point
- Elevation: 10,518 ft (3,206 m)
- Prominence: 234 ft (71 m)
- Coordinates: 44°57′19″N 109°036′35″W

Geography
- Location within Wyoming Location within the United States
- Location: Park County, Wyoming, U.S.
- Parent range: Beartooth Mountains
- Topo map: USGS Beartooth Butte

Climbing
- Easiest route: Hike

Beartooth Butte (10,518 feet (3,206 m)) is in the Beartooth Mountains in the U.S. state of Wyoming. The peak is located in the Absaroka–Beartooth Wilderness of Shoshone National Forest. Rising more than 1,500 feet (460 m) to the northwest above Beartooth Lake, the butte is easily seen from the Beartooth Highway. Unlike the granitic rocks that comprise the vast majority of rocks to be found in the Beartooth Mountains, Beartooth Butte consists mostly of sedimentary rocks. It has the most easily accessible rocks of the Beartooth Butte Formation a geologic formation that preserves fossils dating back to the Devonian period.
