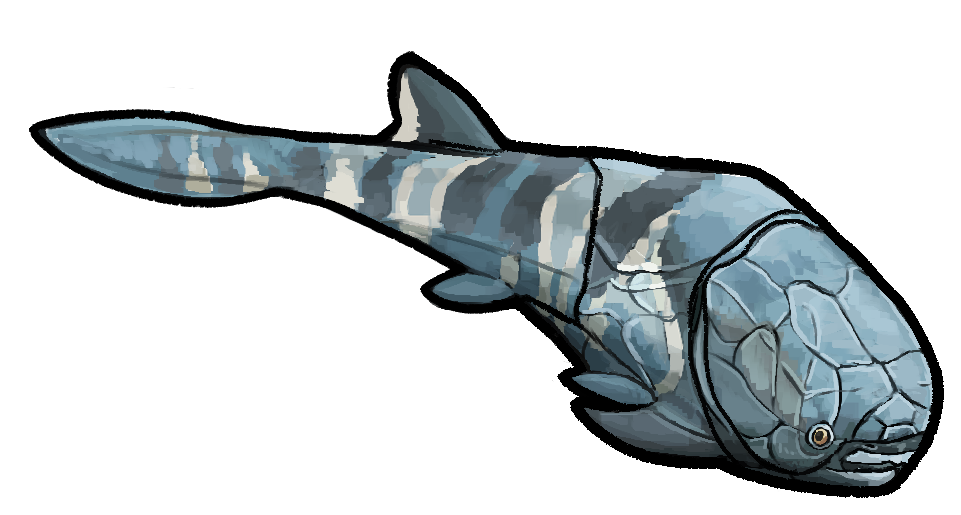

Scientific classification
- Kingdom: Animalia
- Phylum: Chordata
- Class: †Placodermi
- Order: †Arthrodira
- Genus: †Bryantolepis; Camp, Welles, & Green, 1949

Species
- †Bryantolepis brachycephala (Bryant, 1932) (type); †Bryantolepis williamsi Elliot & Carr, 2010

= Bryantolepis =

Bryantolepis Temporal range: Early Devonian 419.2–393.3 Ma

Genus of extinct fish

Bryantolepis is an extinct genus of arthrodire placoderm fish from the Early Devonian period found in northern USA, and currently consists of two species, Bryantolepis brachycephala and Bryantolepis williamsi. The genus is known from multiple parts of the skull roof, the suborbital, endocranium, and trunk shield.

The type species Bryantolepis brachycephala was described by Bryant in 1932, and was found in the Beartooth Butte Formation at Beartooth Butte, Wyoming. It was originally placed in the genus Euryaspis, but was later reassigned to Bryantolepis. It is one of the most common fishes found at the Beartooth Butte Formation.

The second species, Bryantolepis williamsi, was described and named in 2010, and is about 60% larger. It was found at the Utah-Idaho border, specifically in the Grassy Flat Member of the Water Canyon Formation, Green Canyon, northern Utah, and St. Charles, southern Idaho. The specific epithet, williamsi, honors paleontologist Michael E. Williams (1940-2003).

The placement of Bryantolepis within Arthrodira can be shown in the cladogram below:

- Arthrodira
  - antarctaspids
  - - Wuttagoonaspidae
    - - - Lehmanosteus
        - - Kujdanowiaspis
          - - Proaethaspis ohioensis
            - Phyllolepida
      - - Actinolepidae
        - - - Bryantolepis williamsi
            - Bryantolepis brachycephala
          - - Phlyctaeniidae
            - Brachythoraci
              - Coccosteus
              - - Buchanosteus
                - Errolosteus
