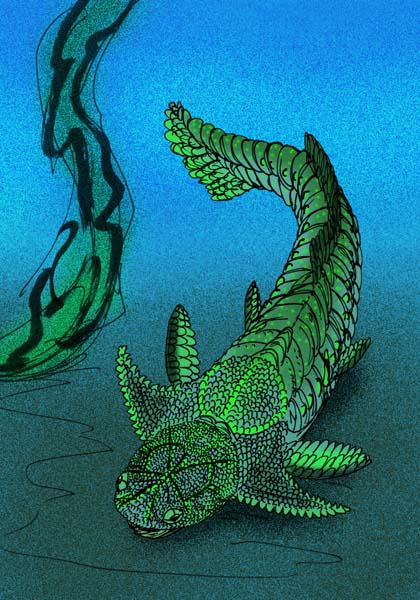
- reconstruction of Actinolepis

Scientific classification
- Kingdom: Animalia
- Phylum: Chordata
- Class: †Placodermi
- Order: †Arthrodira
- Suborder: †Actinolepidoidei
- Family: †Actinolepidae

Genera
- Actinolepis; Aethapsis; Aleosteus; Bollandapsis; Cuanyu; Eskimapsis; Heightingtonaspis; Kujdanowiaspis; Lehmanosteus; Simblaspis

= Actinolepidae =

Actinolepidae Temporal range: Early Devonian

Extinct family of fish

Actinolepidae is an extinct family of placoderm fishes which lived during the Early Devonian period. They are considered to be among the most primitive of the arthrodires, and are widely accepted to be phylogenetically basal to the group.

== Description ==
The bodies of Actinolepids are wide and flat, suggesting that most members of this family were benthic fish. Their jaws were comparatively underdeveloped in comparison to the more robust-jawed arthrodires that would come after them, such as Dunkleosteus and Coccosteus, indicating that it likely subsisted primarily on smaller, softer-bodied animals such as mollusks, or worms instead of larger, tougher prey animals.
