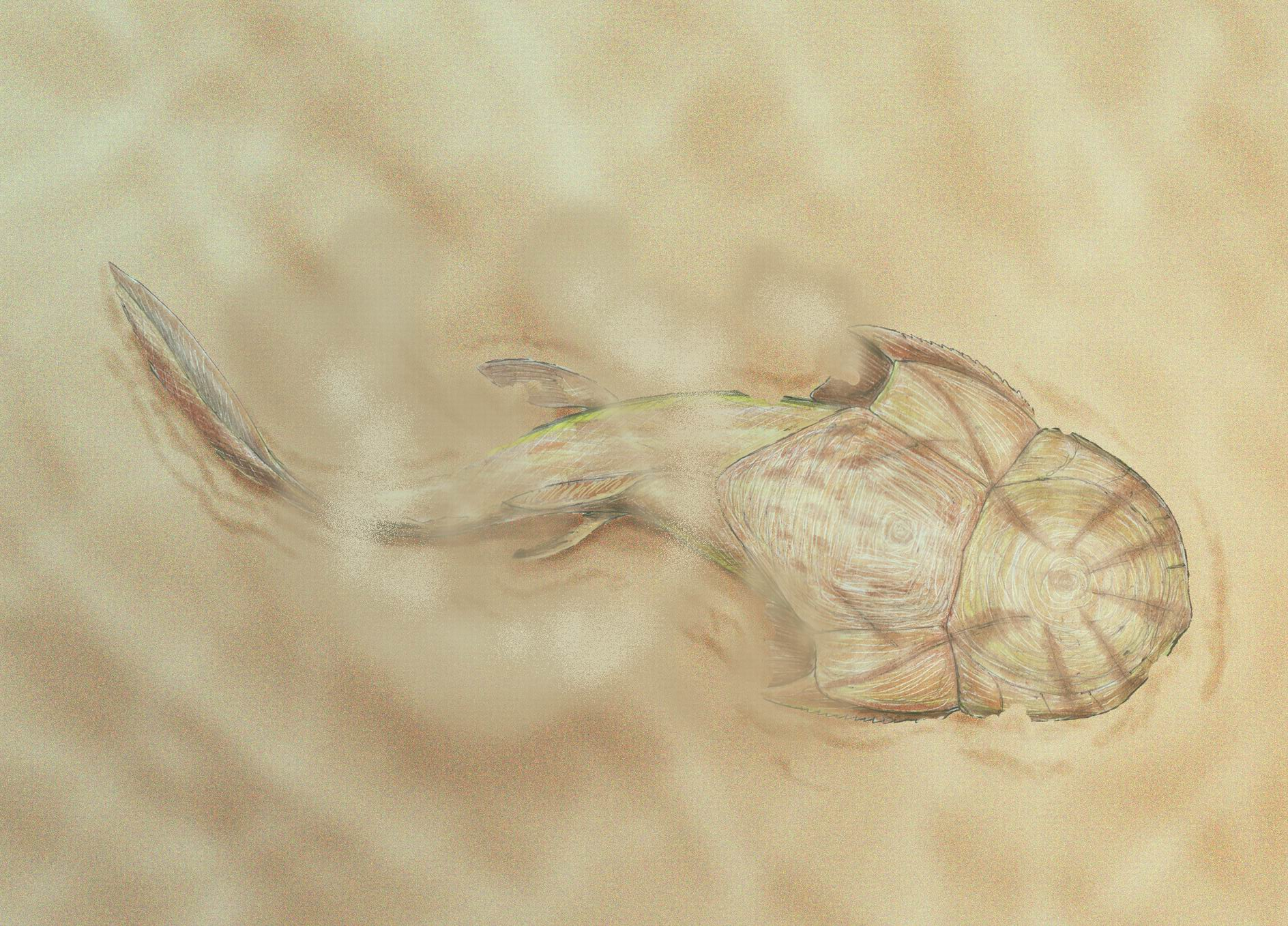

Scientific classification
- Kingdom: Animalia
- Phylum: Chordata
- Class: †Placodermi
- Order: †Arthrodira
- Family: †Phyllolepididae
- Genus: †Phyllolepis; Agassiz 1844

Type species
- Phyllolepis concentrica Agassiz 1844

Species
- P. delicatula 1880; P. woodwardi Woodward, 1915; P. oryini Heintz, 1930; P. soederberghi Sensiö, 1936; P. nielseni Sensiö, 1939; P. undulata P. konincki P. neilseni P. thomsoni Long and Daeschler,2013; P. rossimontina Land and Cuffey, 2005

= Phyllolepis =

Phyllolepis Temporal range: Famennian 380–360 Ma

Genus of flattened placoderms

Phyllolepis (from the Greek roots for ‘leaf’ and ‘scale’) is the type genus of Phyllolepida, an extinct taxon of arthrodire placoderm fish from the middle to late Devonian. The species of Phyllolepis, themselves, are restricted to the Famennian-aged freshwater strata of the Late Devonian, around 360 million years ago. Fossils of this genus have been found primarily in Europe and North America. The end of the Devonian saw them disappear in a mass extinction.

Phyllolepis lived in freshwater environments, possibly rivers and streams. As with all other known phyllolepids, Phyllolepis were presumed to have been blind, bottom-dwelling predators that detected prey through sensory organs in the surface grooves of their armor plates (which gave their plates a distinctive "wooden surface" appearance).

== Description and paleobiology ==
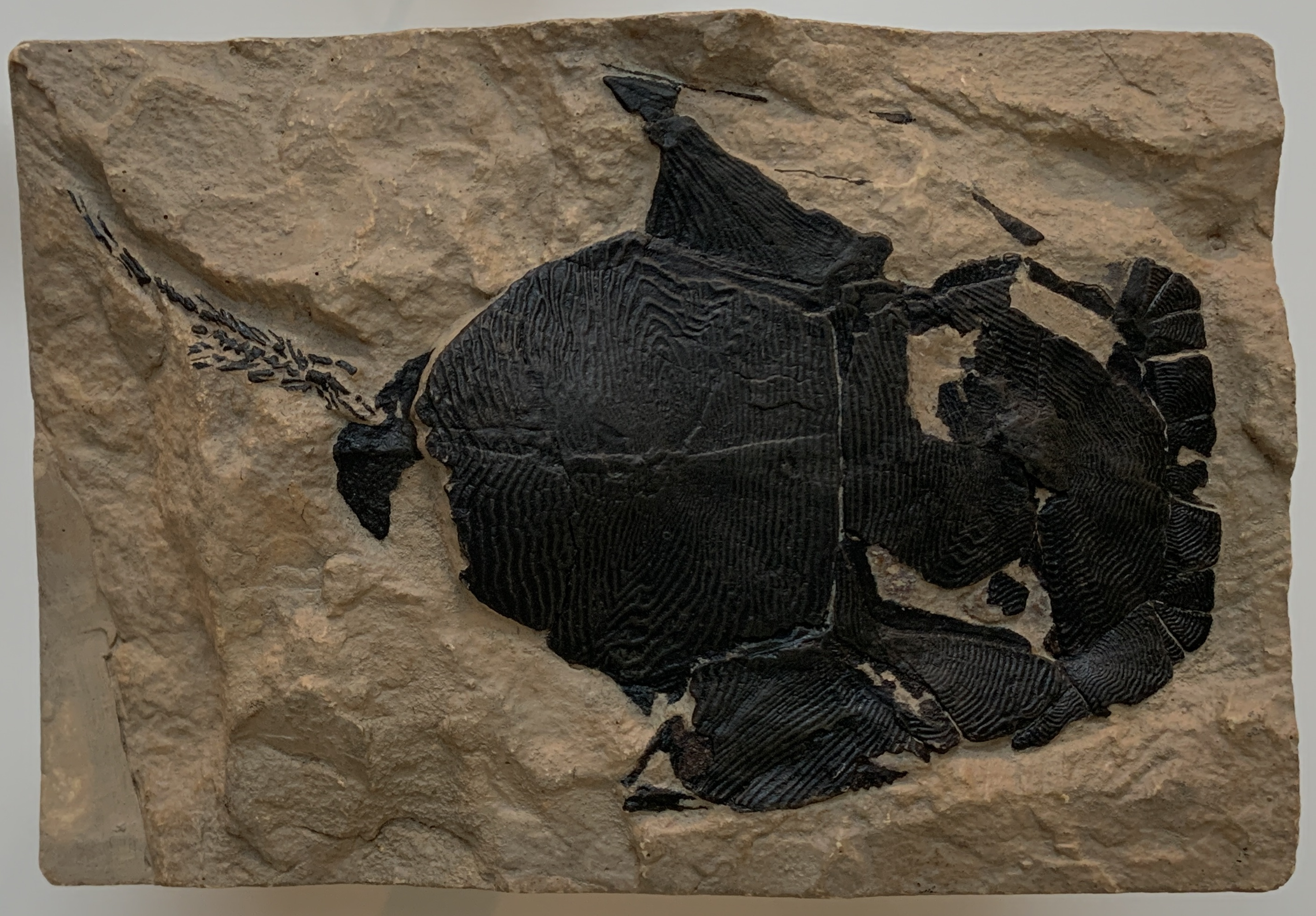
Phyllolepis sp. cast.

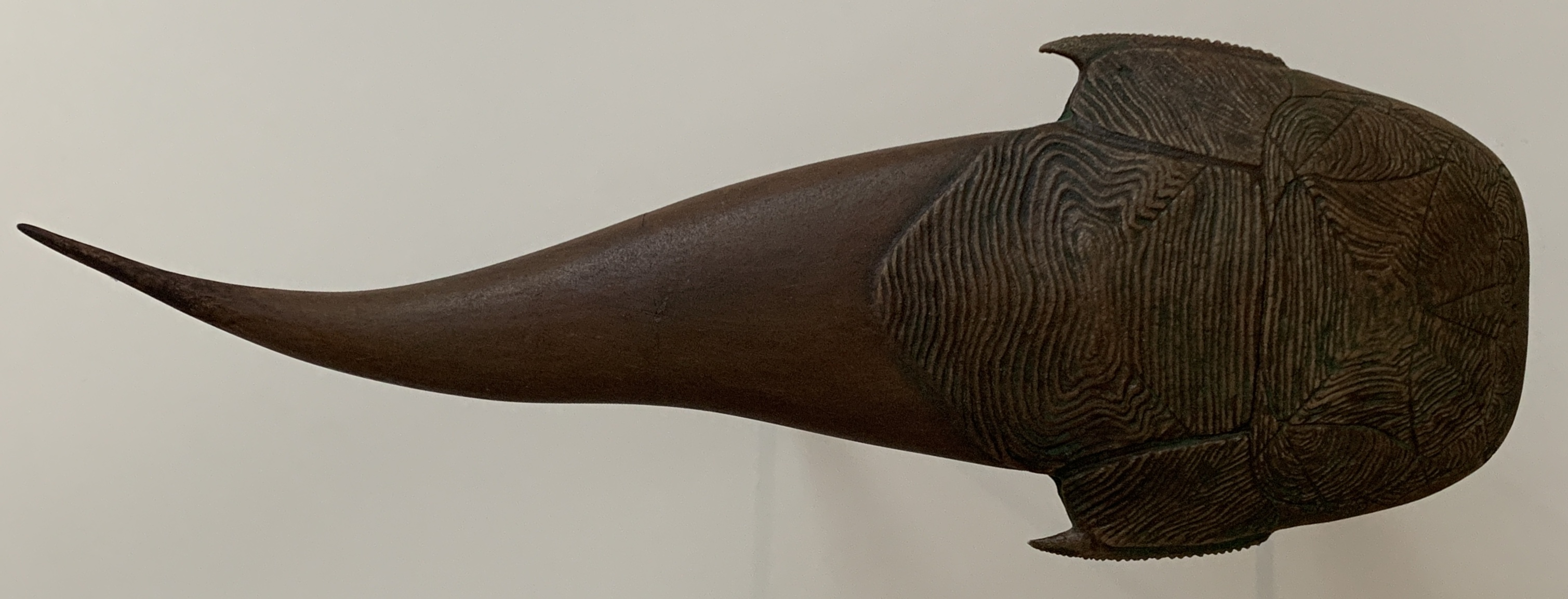
Phyllolepis sp. 1953 plaster model.

Phyllolepis, as was typical of Phyllolepida, tended to be 30 to 40 cm in length and very flat. Phyllolepis have extensive armor made of full, flat plates, rather than scales, with both a wide jaw and mouth. They are characterized by a broad, enlarged nuchal plate paired with four small plates around the upper jaw. They have short and broad anterior ventrolateral plates, as well as paranuchal plates with postnuchal process. They also feature long, narrow anterior dorsolateral plates and a dermal ornamentation of smooth, concentric rings upon their plates.

As a placoderm, Phyllolepis was a primitive jawed fish, with their jaws likely having been evolved from the first set of their gill arches. Elongated basiptergia have been found on some phyllolepid placoderms, such as Austrophyllolepis and Cowralepis, suggesting Phyllolepis may have had them as well.

As with other members of Phyllolepida, Phyllolepis have eyes on either side of their heads, unlike modern flounders, as well as an absent scleral ring. This suggests that the eyes of Phyllolepis may have been much reduced, vestigial, or completely absent. The pattern of raised ridges on its head and trunk plates are a defining trait, setting them apart from other placoderms. The highly developed system of lateral ridges are suggested to have been used for electroreception, in order to sense their surroundings in absence of functional eyes.

Synapomorphies of Phyllolepis include the sub triangular dermal portion of the marginal plate. This genus can be distinguished from Cowralepis because of their deeply concave anterior margin, where it meets the postorbital plate, as well as the exit of the main lateral line canal in the middle of the plate (rather than in its posterior third division). Cowralepis also features a distinct posterior dorsolateral plate, which Phyllolepis lack entirely.

However, because many defining traits for Phyllolepis must be used in conjunction with other traits (for example, the genera Phyllolepis, Placolepis, and Cobandrahlepis all lack a posterior median ventral plate), it is difficult to identify phyllolepid placoderms unless a full fossil assemblage is known. Due to the isolated phyllolepid plates found for species such as P. concentrica, konicki, undulata, and delicatula, it has been suggested by J. Long and E. Daeschler that they be recategorized as Phyllolepidae gen. et sp. Indeterminate. P. woodwardi, orvini, neilseni, and rossimontina are all species with complete and valid sets of plates.

== Ecology ==
These fishes were likely ambush predators, lying in wait in the substrate as bottom-dwellers. Their long tails would be used for rapid propulsion to catch their prey. This is typical of many flattened placoderms.

One of the sites where various Phyllolepis specimens have been discovered, Red Hill in Clinton County, Pennsylvania, shows signs of having been a freshwater subhabitat, similar to current Midwestern lakes. However, dig sites in Europe- and even locations still in the Pennsylvania Catskill formation- may have been home to coastal-marine Phyllolepis species, based on the composition of siltstones and sediment deposits. At least one phyllolepid specimen has been found surrounded by plant material and greenish siltstones, suggesting a low energy environment, such as a floodplain pond. This divide raises some questions about how the genus lived in both places. It is possible there were land connections intercontinentally, or the fishes were euryhaline or marine-tolerant. The fish may have even evolved a freshwater habit after arriving in North America by marine waterways.

All of the phyllolepids found in the Northern Hemisphere have been found in rock dated to the later Devonian Period (Famennian), however Australian and Antarctic samples date earlier, from the late middle Devonian up through the late Famennian. The oldest confirmed Phyllolepid is from the middle Devonian. The genus Phyllolepis has so far only been found in Famennian age strata.

== Species ==
Species	Pieces Found	Discovered by	Date of Discovery	Location	Characteristics
Phyllolepis concentrica	1 anterior ventro-lateral	L. Agassiz	1844	Clashbennie, Scotland	The first Phyllolepis to be found. This species has concentrically arranged ridges parallel to the postero-lateral plate margin, with occasional patches of tubercles. The nuchal plate has a straight to slightly-convex anterior margin, and is only slightly broader anteriorly than posteriorly. The marginal plate has a combination of a sub-triangular exposed area (broadest anteriorly) and a lateral line canal crossing onto the paranuchal plate from within the posterior third of the marginal. The posterior median ventral plate is absent, as well as the posterior dorsolateral plates.
P. delicatula			1880	Catskill Formation, Newberry, Pennsylvania	In 2005, this species became nomen nudum due to a lack of defining features.
P. nielseni	1 paranuchal; 2, possibly 4, antero-laterals; 3 anterior ventro-laterals				
P. undulata	1 nucha; 6 median dorsals			Strud Quarry, Strud, Belgium	Widely spaced ornamentation in the forms of ridges, as well as a taller than broad nuchal. This species is thoroughly described, and has recently been suggested by Olive, S. et al. to be an umbrella species for both P. konincki and P. rossimontina.
P. konincki					Has a pronounced curve in the posterolateral plate margin, and a well-defined angle where the anterior and lateral plate margins are joined. Recently suggested to be a synonym for P. undulata.
P. woodwardi	2 nuchals	Woodward	1915	Dura Den beds, Scotland	Named by Sensiö in 1939, this species has a latter posterior margin than P. Rossimontina, and lacks exaggerated anteromedial plate corners.
P. orvini		Heintz	1930	East Greenland	Named by Sensiö in 1934, this species has ridges on the anterior portion of the nuchal plate, as well as one central two lateral protrusions on the anterior margin of the nuchal. There are blunted anteromedial corners on the anterior ventrolateral plates.
P. soederberghi		Sensiö	1936		
P. neilseni		Sensiö	1939		Proportionately broader anterior ventro-lateral plates than P. Rossimontina. Elongated plate outline, convexly curved anterior plate margin, and concavely curved posterolateral plate margin.
P. thomsoni				Covington Bypass, Catskill Formation, Pennsylvania	Etymology: Named for Dr. Keith S. Thomson, who has made significant contributions to the study of Devonian fossils. This species has a nuchal plate with two concave anterodorsal margins for contact with postorbital, postnasal, and preorbital plates. The preorbital plates are found to meet meially (minus P. orvini, all phyllolepid species share this trait). The dermal ornamentation is of distinct and widely separated concentric lines on the nuchal, median dorsal, anterior lateral, and parnuchal plates. There are patches of tuberculation and shorter lineations on the external margins of the preorbital, post nasal, postorbital, and marginal plates.
P. rossimontina	a partially articulated individual	Lane and Cuffey	2005	upper Devonian Catskill Formation, Red Hill, Pennsylvania	Etymology: from Italian, after the locality name (Red Hill): rossi as red, montina as hill. The nuchal plate of this species has a distinctly notched margin at the lateral corners, which projects past the paranuchal plate boundaries. The dermal ornamentation of the dorsal plates is composed of a meshwork reticulated pattern and linear-style ornamentation on the ventral plates. There are also smaller regions of clear meshwork reticulation. This species is currently under contention: it has been called to be included as a synonym of P. undulata by Olive et al. (2015), due to its characteristic broadness being within acceptable range of P. Undulata specimens found.

== History of categorization ==
Phyllolepis was the first genus to be recognized in the order Phyllolepidae until 1984. Phyllolepis concentrica was the first species discovered of the genus, by Louis Agassiz in 1844 at Clashbennie, Scotland. This specimen caused Woodward to incorrectly classify them as a distinct group belonging to the jawless fishes in 1915, along with Drepanaspidae. Sensiö continued, with several publications in the 1930s, to show that phyllolepids had jaws, and belonged with placoderms. He also proclaimed them part of Phyllolepida, based on his studies of P. orvini, P. soederberghi, and P. neilseni.

From the 1930s to 50s, there were several isolated dermal plates of phyllolepids found in Australia, attributed by Hills to be Phyllolepis but specific species left undefined. In the 1970s many complete, articulated Phyllolepid specimens were found from the middle Devonian at the Mt. Howitt site in Australia. This material was gradually defined as genus Austrophyllolepis, based on plate proportions, but also solidified the assignment of the group to Placodermi and as a clade inside Arthrodira.

The more recent introduction of P. rossimontina as a species in 2005 demonstrated, in part, a wide range of variability within the genus Phyllolepis, causing some scientists to begin a revision of the genus.

The low number of complete Phyllolepis specimens found combined with key identifying features only visible on specific plates has made it difficult to confidently identify species, causing some paleontologists to call for redesignations of the current named species of Phyllolepis.
