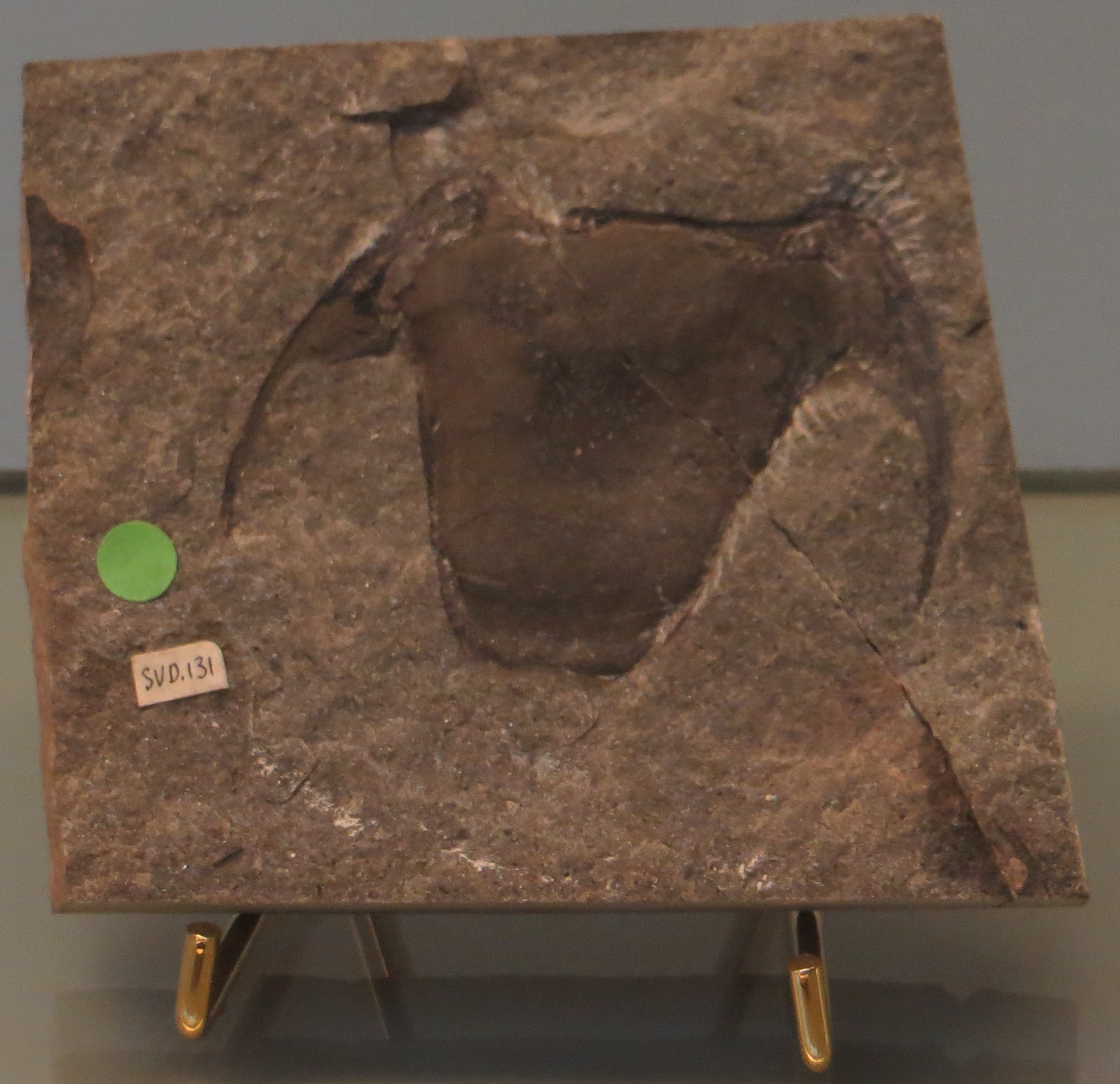
- D. arcticus fossil

Scientific classification
- Kingdom: Animalia
- Phylum: Chordata
- Class: †Placodermi
- Order: †Arthrodira
- Family: †Phlyctaeniidae
- Genus: †Dicksonosteus; Goujet, 1975

Type species
- †Dicksonosteus arcticus Goujet, 1975

= Dicksonosteus =

Dicksonosteus Temporal range: Early Devonian

Extinct genus of fishes

Dicksonosteus is an extinct genus of basal arthrodire placoderm fish which lived during the Early Devonian period of Spitsbergen, Norway.

== Classification ==
Within Arthrodira, Dicksonosteus is considered a member of Phlyctaenii, a paraphyletic grouping within the clade Phlyctaenioidei, basal to the suborder Brachythoraci. Dicksonosteus was once considered an actinolepid, but is now grouped within the family Phlyctaeniidae. Dicksonosteus is most closely related to Arctolepis and Heintzosteus.

== Description ==
Artist's reconstruction of D. arcticus

Dicksonosteus is considered basal to the arthrodires, the most successful and widespread group of placoderms during the Devonian period notable for the movable joint between the armour sections surrounding their heads and bodies. Its body is wide and flat, and unlike the more robust-jawed arthrodires that would come after it, such as Dunkleosteus and Coccosteus, its jaws were relatively feeble, suggesting the lifestyle of a benthic fish that subsisted primarily on smaller, softer-bodied animals. Exceptionally preserved fossil specimens of Dicksonosteus from Spitsbergen, Norway display details of its braincase and internal anatomy, the details of which have been described.
