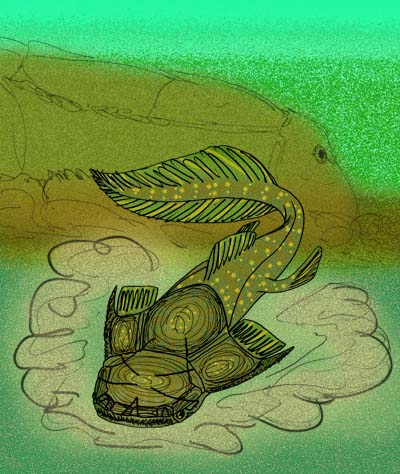
- Austrophyllolepis ritchiei and Bothriolepis mawsoni

Scientific classification
- Kingdom: Animalia
- Phylum: Chordata
- Class: †Placodermi
- Order: †Arthrodira
- Suborder: †Phyllolepida; Stensiö 1934

Type species
- Phyllolepis concentrica Agassiz 1844

Families
- Phyllolepididae; Gavinaspididae

= Phyllolepida =

Phyllolepida Temporal range: Devonian

Extinct taxon of flattened placoderms

Phyllolepida ("leaf scales") is an extinct taxon of flattened placoderms found throughout the world, with fossils being found in Devonian strata. Like other flattened placoderms, the phyllolepids were bottom-dwelling predators that ambushed prey. Unlike other flattened placoderms, the phyllolepids were inhabitants of freshwater environments.

Unlike the Rhenanida, the armor of the phyllolepids were made of whole plates, rather than numerous tubercles and scales, and unlike the Petalichthyida, the components of the comparatively wide mouth are known. The phyllolepids are considered to have been blind, as the orbits for the eyes are extremely small, so much so as to suggest that the eyes were vestigial, and that they were placed on the sides of the head, as opposed to visually-oriented bottom-dwelling predators, like, say stargazers or flatfish, which have the eyes placed high on top of the head.

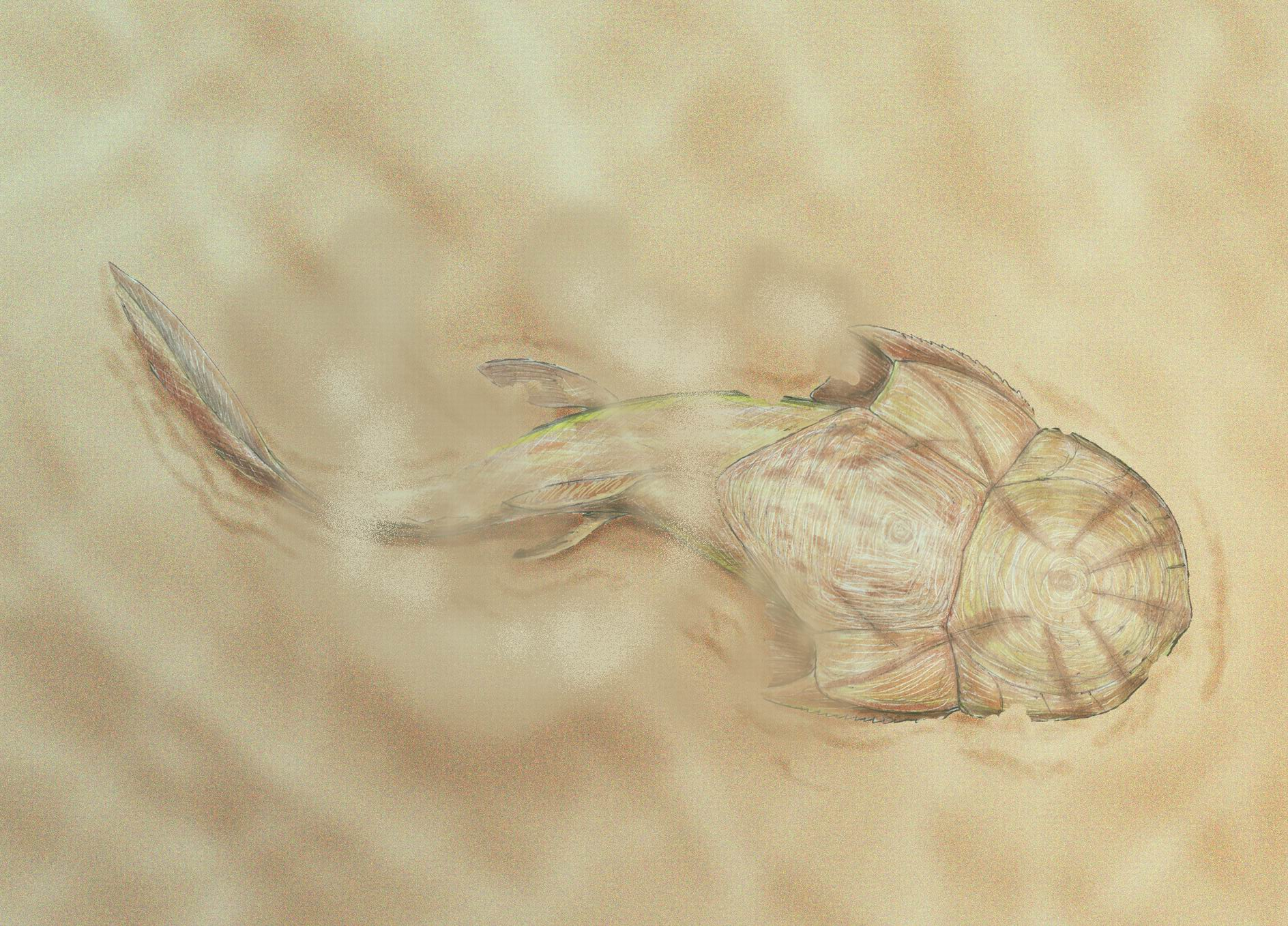
Phyllolepis orvini

Despite having a relatively clear idea of the phyllolepids' lifestyle and anatomy, most fossils consist of fragments of their thoracic armor, and only two genera, Phyllolepis and Austrophyllolepis have been thoroughly studied. From the articulation of the thoracic and head plates, it has been suggested that they are either the sister group of order Arthrodira, or are in fact, a group of highly derived arthrodires.

== Taxonomy ==
The Phyllolepids are divided into two families, the more primitive Gavinaspididae, represented only by Gavinaspis of Early Devonian China, and Phyllolepididae, which contains all other genera. Barring the Chinese Gavinaspis, the cosmopolitan Placolepis (fossils of which have been found in Australia, Turkey, Venezuela, and Antarctica), and the Euro-North American Phyllolepis, the majority of genera are found in Early to Middle Devonian Australia. By the Famennian, only Phyllolepis survived, and became extinct at the close of the Devonian.
