= Gavinaspis =

Gavinaspis Temporal range: Early Devonian (Lochkovian)

Scientific classification
- Kingdom: Animalia
- Phylum: Chordata
- Class: †Placodermi
- Order: †Arthrodira
- Suborder: †Phyllolepida
- Family: †Gavinaspididae; Dupret & Zhu, 2008
- Genus: †Gavinaspis; Dupret & Zhu, 2008
- Species: †G. convergens

Binomial name
- †Gavinaspis convergens Dupret & Zhu, 2008

Genus of placoderm fishes

Gavinaspis is a phyllolepid placoderm which lived during the Early Devonian period (Late Lochkovian epoch), of Qujing, Yunnan province, south China.

== Discovery and naming ==
The known fossil remains of Gavinaspis convergens were collected by the Early Vertebrate Research Group of IVPP during field trips from 1998 to 2006, and the species was officially published in 2008 in Geological Magazine. The specimens are from the middle part of the Xitun Formation, which dates to the late Lochkovian. The generic name honors Dr Gavin C. Young of the Australian National University.

The species is known from a portion of a skull roof (the holotype, IVPP V 15085-1, 2) and three left paranuchal plates. No thoracic material is known.
