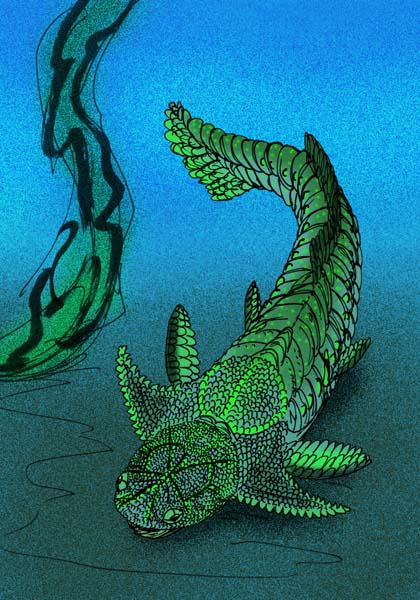
- Reconstruction of A. tuberculata

Scientific classification
- Kingdom: Animalia
- Phylum: Chordata
- Class: †Placodermi
- Order: †Arthrodira
- Family: †Actinolepidae
- Genus: †Actinolepis; Agassiz, 1845

Type species
- †Actinolepis tuberculata Agassiz, 1845

Other species
- †A. magna Mark-Kurik, 1973 (vide Denison, 1978); †A. spinosa Mark-Kurik, 1985; †A. zaikai Plax & Newman, 2020

= Actinolepis (placoderm) =

Actinolepis Temporal range: Early Devonian, 409.1–391.9 Ma

Extinct genus of fishes

Actinolepis is an extinct genus of actinolepid placoderm from the Early Devonian. Four species are known: A. magna from Estonia, A. spinosa from Latvia (Sevy Dolomite), the type species A. tuberculata from New Zealand (Adam Mudstone Formation) and A. zaikai from Belarus (Lepel Beds).

== Gallery ==
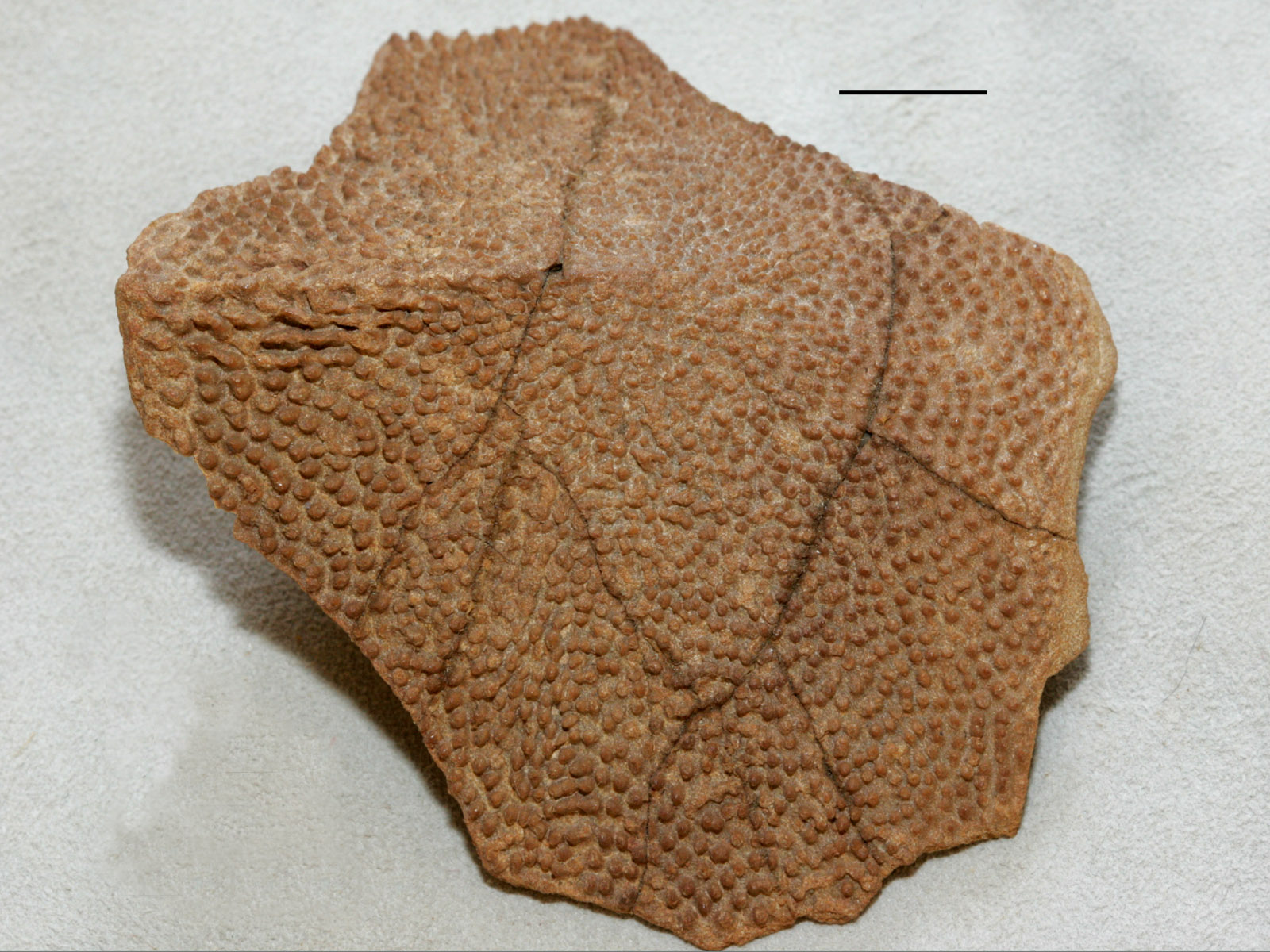
Fragmentary dorsal armour of A. magna (specimen EMNH 203503); housed at the Estonian Museum of Natural History
