= Eurycaraspis =

Eurycaraspis Temporal range: Givetian

Scientific classification
- Kingdom: Animalia
- Phylum: Chordata
- Class: †Placodermi
- Order: †Petalichthyida
- Family: †Quasipetalichthyidae
- Genus: †Eurycaraspis; Liu, 1991
- Species: †E. incilis

Binomial name
- †Eurycaraspis incilis Liu, 1991

Extinct species of fish

Eurycaraspis incilis is an extinct petalichthyid placoderm from the Middle Devonian of China. It is closely related to Quasipetalichthys.

== Anatomy ==
Eurycaraspis incilis differs from Quasipetalichthys by having a more circular-shaped skull.

== Phylogeny ==
Eurycaraspis incilis is considered a basal petalichthyid, and is placed in Quasipetalichthyidae as Quasipetalichthys' sister taxon. Quasipetalichthyidae, in turn, is considered the sister group of Macropetalichthyidae.
