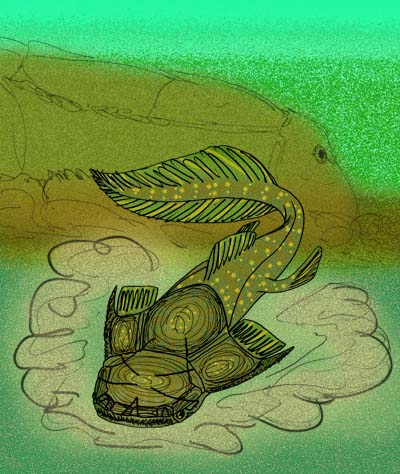
- Artist's reconstruction

Scientific classification
- Kingdom: Animalia
- Phylum: Chordata
- Class: †Placodermi
- Order: †Arthrodira
- Family: †Phyllolepididae
- Genus: †Austrophyllolepis; Long, 1984

Type species
- Austrophyllolepis ritchiei Long, 1984

Species
- Austrophyllolepis dulciensis; Austrophyllolepis ritchiei

= Austrophyllolepis =

Genus of extinct placoderms

Austrophyllolepis is an extinct genus of phyllolepid arthrodire placoderm from Middle to Late Devonian freshwater strata of Australia. The type species, A. ritchiei is found in Givetian to early Frasnian-aged freshwater rocks near what is now Mount Howitt. A second species, A. dulciensis, is found from Middle Devonian freshwater strata from the Dulcie Sandstone of Georgina Basin, Central Australia.
