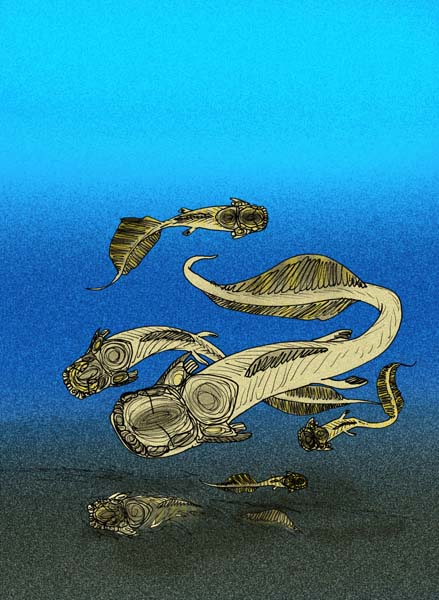
- Restoration of C. mclachlani

Scientific classification
- Kingdom: Animalia
- Phylum: Chordata
- Class: †Placodermi
- Order: †Arthrodira
- Family: †Phyllolepididae
- Genus: †Cowralepis; Ritchie, 2005

Type species
- Cowrapelis mclachlani Ritchie, 2005

= Cowralepis =

Cowralepis Temporal range: Late Devonian, Givetian

Extinct genus of fishes

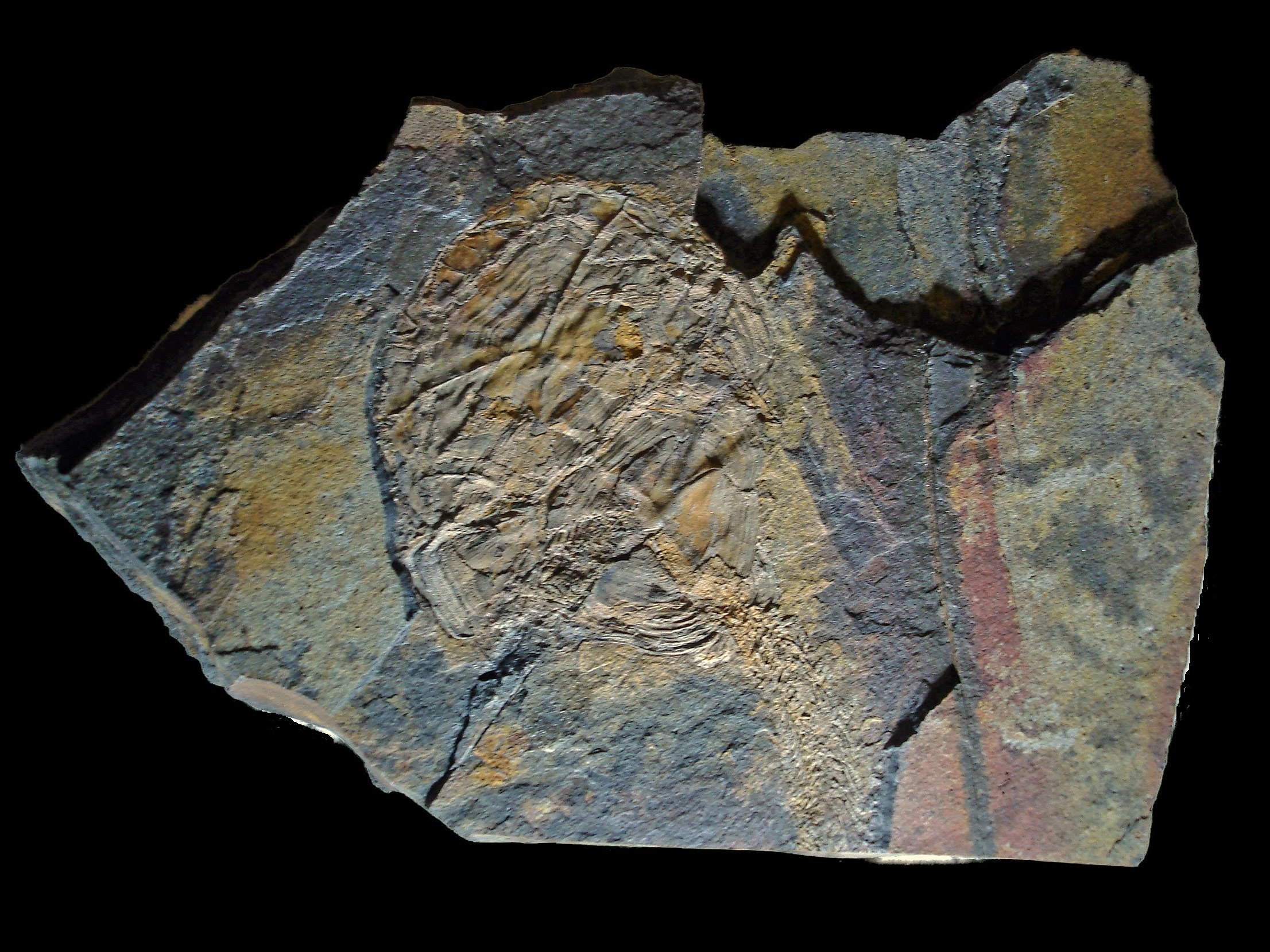
†Cowralepis mclachlani from the Devonian (Givetian) of Cowra, Australia

Cowralepis is an extinct genus of phyllolepid placoderm of Givetian Cowra, New South Wales, and several juveniles of various stages of growth have also been discovered. Cowralepis grew to 35 centimeters. These armored fish had a head shield larger than its trunk shield, contrary to other phyllolepids. They lacked a dorsal fin, but obtained a dorsal keel in adults.
