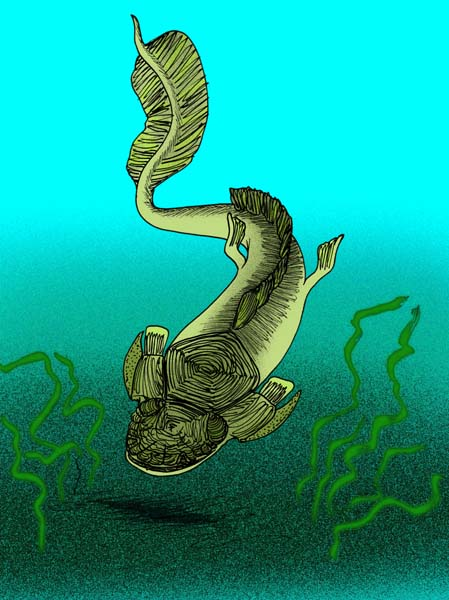
- Restoration of P. budawangensis

Scientific classification
- Kingdom: Animalia
- Phylum: Chordata
- Class: †Placodermi
- Order: †Arthrodira
- Family: †Phyllolepididae
- Genus: †Placolepis; Ritchie, 1984

Type species
- Placolepis tingeyi Ritchie, 1984

Species
- †P. budawangensis; †P. tingeyi

= Placolepis =

Placolepis Temporal range: Devonian, Frasnian–Famennian

Extinct genus of phyllolepid placoderm

Placolepis is an extinct genus of phyllolepid placoderm first discovered in New South Wales. Placolepis was the most widespread phyllolepid genus, with fossils found in Australia, Turkey, Venezuela and Antarctica.
