= Aztec Siltstone =

Geological formation in Antarctica

- Stratigraphic range: Late Devonian, (Famennian?)
- Type: Formation
- Unit of: Taylor Group
- Underlies: Beacon Heights Orthoquartzite
- Overlies: Weller Sandstone
- Thickness: 220 metres (720 ft)

Lithology
- Primary: sandstone, claystone, siltstone
- Other: limestone, conglomerate

Location
- Region: Victoria Land
- Country: Antarctica

Type section
- Named for: Aztec Mountain
- Named by: Webb, 1963

Aztec Siltstone is a geological formation in Victoria Land, Antarctica. It is part of the Taylor Group which preserves fossils dating back to the Middle-Late Devonian boundary. The formation is the uppermost formation in the group and overlays the Beacon Heights Orthoquartzite and underlies the Weller Sandstone. It preserves an alluvial plain environment with a seasonal climate, a large amount of fish fossils including both placoderms and acanthodians have been found in the formation.

== Discovery and naming ==
The Aztec Siltstone was originally defined in 1963 as a sequence made up of green and red siltstone between the Beacon Heights Orthoquartzite and the Weller Sandstone. Like its name suggests, the type section of the formation is located on the Aztec Mountain. Though found on other places in the continent, the material at the formation was the first in situ fish material found in Antarctica; these were found during the Trans-Antarctic Expedition that took place between 1955 and 1957. Over the decades, the Aztec Sandstone has become one of the most diverse vertebrate assemblages from the Middle to Late Devonian.

== Lithology ==
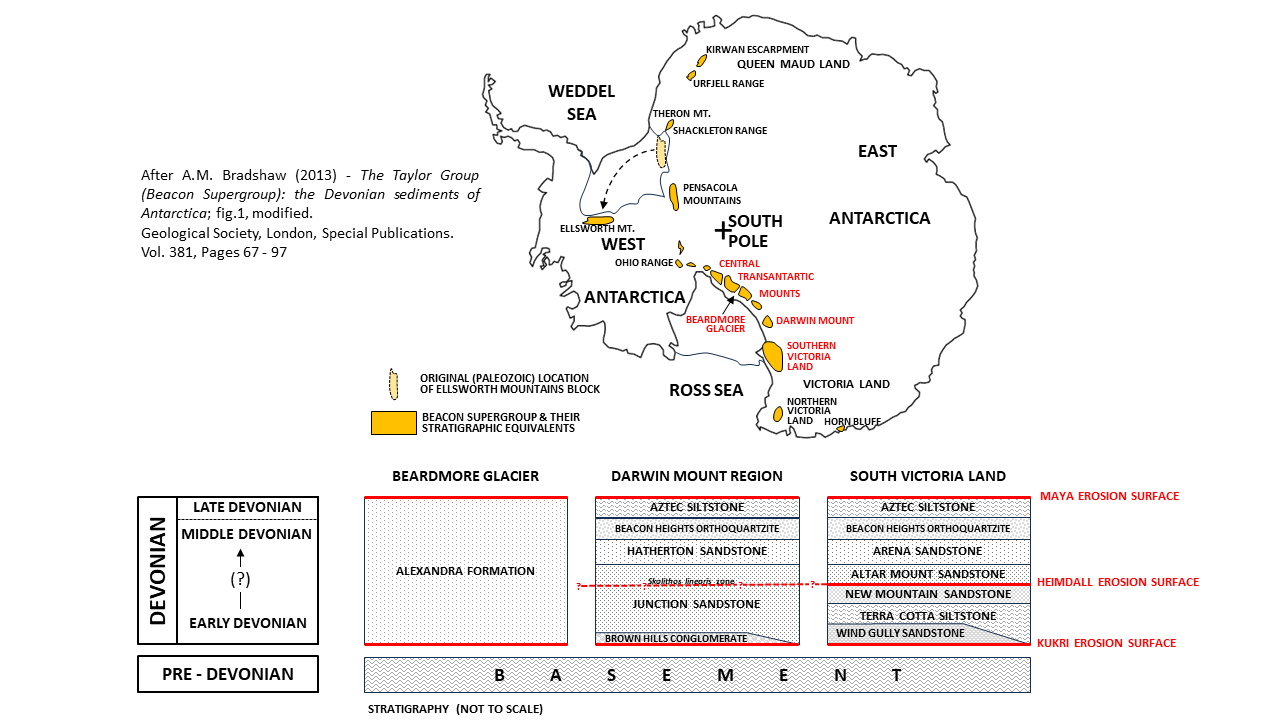
The stratigraphy of the Taylor Group

The Aztec Siltstone varies in depth within the strata of the formation with the sections at Mount Richie reaching depths of 220 m while those seen at Maya Mountain only being a thickness of 40 m. There is a general thinning of the layers of the formation from south or north which is most likely caused by ice-sheets present in the area during the Late Carboniferous to Early Permian. Overlying of the Aztec Siltstone at the base of the Weller Coal Measure, the Metshel Tilite disconformity is present. The contact is gradational due to the lower beds of the disconformity being composed of locally eroded parts of the Aztec Siltstone. Unlike its upper contact, the lower between the Aztec Siltstone and Beacon Heights Orthoquartzite is conformable. This gradational contact is indicated by the finer beds which are very characteristic of the Siltstone and is around 5–10 m thick.

=== Sandstone ===
It is largely made up of fine to medium grain sandstones which are white or grey in color, with these rocks making up 50% of the volume of the formation. These beds range between 0.1 and 15 m thick and are evenly distributed throughout the formation. The different grained sandstones are laid in cycles and are most commonly tablet or lens-shaped. The sandstone blocks can span for hundreds of meters with thicker bodies made up of multiple beds even being able to span for kilometers. Sandstones rich in quartz are only present in small amounts and are associated with quartz pebbles. Though the sandstones aren't red, there is evidence like the presence of bleached sections of sandstone near red claystones, that suggests that the red pigment of the sandstone may have been chemically removed.

=== Siltstone and Claystone ===
Siltstones and claystones also make up a large amount of the lithology, with the red beds making up 30% of the fine-grained parts of the formation. Just like the sandstone beds, these deposits are commonly lens-shaped and can span between 3 and 500m. The size of these beds is mostly determined by the depth which are much more variable than what is seen in the sandstone beds; these range between a few centimeters and 15 m in depth. Though these beds are originally described as being green and red in color, it is more accurate to say that they are greenish-grey and redish-green in color. The green color of the lithology is commonly a secondary color with remnant red pigment being found within it. The colors of these beds aren't present in any sort of order with zones of green being present within red beds. Though uncommon, there are grey sandstones also present. There are conglomerates made up of clasts of these rocks in course-member units which range between a few millimeters. They likely represent underwater erosion of finer-grained lithologies right before the coarse-members were deposited. Due the conglomerates' non-rounded shapes, its likely they traveled a maximum of around a few hundred meters from where they originated from.

=== Limestone ===
The least common sediment that makes up the lithology is limestones, mostly being present as cement within sandstones. There is a single occurrence of limestone with spherical to subspherical ooliods present, being in a thin, lens-shaped Portal Mountain. These ooliods are considered to have been formed in shallow calcium carbonate-rich lakes, specifically the high-energy wave zones.

== Dating ==
Though consistently dated to the Middle to Late Devonian, the exact dating of the formation has slightly changed since the original description. This is due to the small amount of trace and plant fossils along with the conchostracans found at the Aztec Siltstone not being datable. It was originally suggested to be Upper Devonian in 1921 only to be dated to the upper Middle Devonian in 1969. One of the more recent suggestions was by Richie in 1975, which placed the formation between the Famennian to potentially the Strunian age. The Strunian being a name for the uppermost segment of the Famennian which ranges from around 363 to 360 mya.

== Paleobiota ==
=== Acanthodii ===
Genus	Species	Notes	Image
Acanthodidae? gen. et sp. indet.		An indeterminate acanthodid known from small scales along with a jaw. The jaw does resemble Acanthodes sulcatus though the material isn't able to be confidentially assigned to a specific genus.	
Antarctonchus	A. glacialis	A larger diplacanthid only known from fin spines that are much larger than other members from the Aztec Siltstone. Due to the larger size, the fin spines contain a larger amount of ribs than Byssacanthoides and Milesacanthus.	
Byssacanthoides	B. debenhami	A diplacanthid only known from fragmentary fin spines. Even with the fragmentary materials, the distal part of the spines seemed to be more rounded that what is seen in Milesacanthus.	
Culmacanthus	C. antarctica	A culmacanthid known from fin spines from the formation though the material wasn't confidently assigned to the genus.	
Gyracanthides	G. warreni	A gyracanthid known from fin spines. When compared to another species, G. murrayi, G. warreni has a smooth insertion area.	
Ischnacanthid indet.		An indeterminate ischnacanthid.	
Milesacanthus	M. antarctica	A diplacanthid that doesn't have as deep of a body as other members of the family like Culmacanthus. It's fin spines are similar to what is seen in Byssacanthoides and Antarctonchus.	
Nostolepis	N. sp. cf. N. gaujensis	A climatiid only known from large scales for the genus. Though similar to what is seen in N. gaujensi, they can't be confidently assigned to the species. They possess distinct sharp ridges along with ultrasculpture in the shape of honeycombs.	
Pechoralepis	P. juozasi	An acritolepid known from medium-sized scales which are square or diamond shaped. They are similar to those seen in P. valentinae.	

=== Chondrichthyes ===
Genus	Species	Notes	Image
Anareodus	A. statei		
Antarctilamna	A. prisca	An antarctilamnid from seven teeth that show heterdonty.	
Aztecodus	A. harmsenae	An aztecondontid with multicusped teeth with the largest cusp being, at the largest, four times larger than the second principal cusp.	
Mcmurdodus	M. featherensis		
Portalodus	P. bradshawae	An acritolepid known from a large amount of average-sized scales which are either diamond or square in shape. The shape of the crown is similar to a number of acanthodians along with the modern-day Centrophorus granulosus.	

=== Osteichthyes ===
Genus	Species	Notes	Image
Aztecia	A. mahalae	A small rhizodont known from an incomplete front limb that possess a wide flange at the front of the humerus similar to Sauripteris.	
?ctenodontid indet			
Donnrosenia	D. schaefferi	A howqualepidid known from a large amount of material. Its body was similar to most other fish, being fusiform, though it lacked paired fringing fulcra on the fins which were very common at the time.	
Eoctenodus	?E. sp		
Gyroptychius	G?. antarcticus		
Howidipterus	H. sp		
Koharalepis	K. jarviki		
Mahalalepis	M. resima		
Notorhizodon	N. mackelveyi		
?palaeoniscoid indet.			
Platyethmoidia	P. antarctica		
porolepiform indet.			
Vorobjevaia	V. dolonodon		

=== Placodermi ===
Genus	Species	Notes	Image
Antarctaspis	A. mcmurdoensis		
Antarctolepis	A. gunni	An arthrodire known from an anterior lateral plate similar to the genus Neophlyctaenius. The bone is narrow though still forms a postbranchial lamina.	
Austrophyllolepis	A. cf. youngi	An phyllolepid known from an incomplete median dorsal plate similar to A. youngi though there are differences including the much smaller size.	
Austrophyllolepis	A. quiltyi	A phyllolepid known from multiple incomplete plates. Ornamentation on median dorsal plate and nuchal plates have two distinct zones.	
Barwickosteus	B. antarcticus	A small phlyctaeniid known only from trunk armor. Though similar to Barrydalaspis, it has longer spinals that tend to go in more consistent directions that it's relative.	
Boomeraspis	B. goujeti	A groenlandaspid known from a variety of plates, the posterior dorsolateral plate was highly ornamented. It most likely would have had a ridge running the length of the top of the trunk armor, like other members of the family.	
Bothriolepis	B. antarctica	A species within the genus that has a pointed projection on the back of the posterior median dorsal plate.	
Bothriolepis	B. alexi		
Bothriolepis	B. askinae		
Bothriolepis	B. barretti		
Bothriolepis	B. karawaka		
Bothriolepis	B. kohni		
Bothriolepis	B. macphersoni		
Bothriolepis	B. mawsoni		
Bothriolepis	B. portalensis		
Bothriolepis	B. vuwae		
Bothriolepis	B. sp. indet. 1–13		
Grifftaylor	G. antarcticus	A phlyctaeniid only known from the trunk armor. Unlike all other members of the family, its posterior dorsolateral plate is longer than it is high.	
Groenlandaspis	G. antarcticus	A groenlandaspid similar to the type species of the genus.	
Groenlandaspis	G. spp		
Mulgaspis	?M. sp. indet	An indetreminate groenlandaspid similar to Mulgaspis known from very incomplete remains. When compared to other members of the family found at the Aztec Siltstone, the front and back areas of the median dorsal plate enclose at smaller angle.	
phyllolepid indet.		Fragmentary material of phyllolepids most likely referable to multiple other genera within the family, even if they can't be assigned to anything specific.	
phlyctaeniid sp. nov.			
Placolepis	P. tingeyi	A phyllolepid with longer lateral margins on the nuchal plate than other species within the genus. The plate is angled towards the area towards the back of the body.	
Turrisaspis	?T. sp. indet	An indetreminate groenlandaspid similar to Turrisapspis. The material differs in morphology, with one example being posterior dorsolateral plate that lacks the upward projection near the front of the plate.	
Venezuelepis	V. antarctica		
Yurammia	Y. sp. nov		

=== Thelodonti ===
Genus	Species	Notes	Image
Turinia	T. antarctica	A large turiniid known from hundreds of scales which most likely came from only a small amount of individuals.	

=== Plantae ===
Genus	Species	Notes	Image
Ancyrospora	aff. A. sp		
Apiculatisporis	A. sp		
Emphanisporites	E. sp		
Geminospora	G. lemurata		
Haplostigma	H. Iineare		
Leiotriletes	L. sp		
Praeramunculus	P. alternatiramus		
Retesotriletes	R. spp		
Rugulatisporites	R. sp		
Verrucosisporites	V. spp		

=== Ichnotaxa ===
Genus	Species	Notes	Image
Cylindricum	C. sp		
Thalassinoides	T. ichnocoenosis		

== Paleoenvironment ==
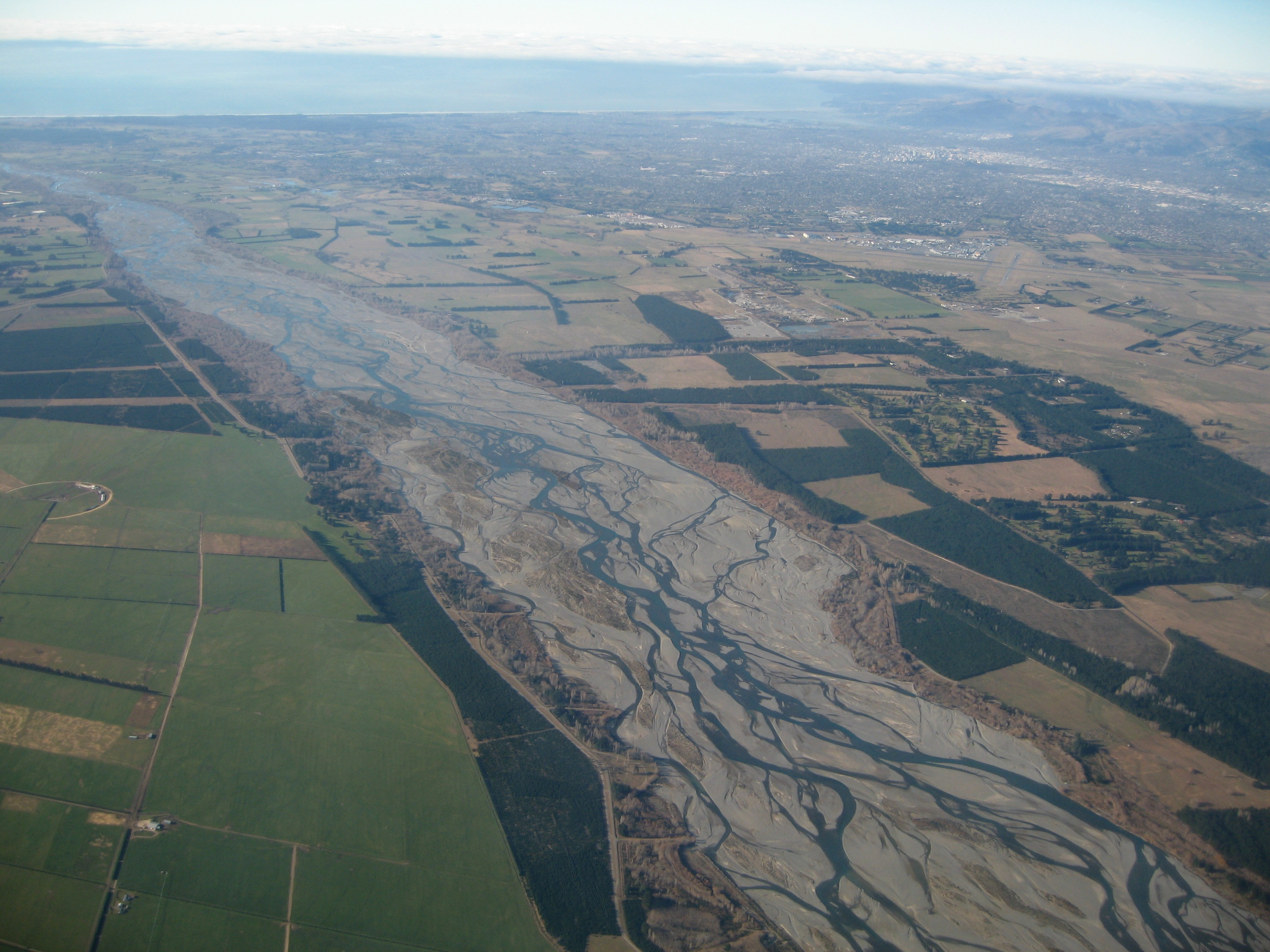
A modern-day alluvial plain, similar to the paleoenvironment of the Aztec Siltstone

The Aztec Siltstone, as a whole, represents a low-lying alluvial plain. The floodplain would have been made up of a large amount of channels ranging between a few cm and around 0.5 m in width as indicated by a number of "scoured" surfaces. Along with these smaller streams, there would have been larger channels which would have been over 10 m wide and had depths ranging from 0.5 to 3 m. The channels that made up the alluvial plain would have flowed northeastward which would have directed the water off of the East Antarctic Shield. Throughout these channels, there is an extensive presence of mud cracks with indicate subaerial exposure that would have been common throughout the floodplain.

These cracks are most similar to those seen in sandy ephemeral streams along with a low amount of vegetation near the body of water. However, due to the presence of tubes suggested to be created by roots along with plant spores found associated with them, there was some sort of vegetation present. The paleosols also suggest that the areas surrounding the bodies of water would have been forested to some extent with them being classified as Alfisols by Gregory Retallack in 1997. The spores assemblage present at the formation is dominated by Geminospora, it is similar to what are seen in other late Devonian formations seen in Australia. Another feature of the floodplain would have been the presence of oxbow lakes and pluvial ponds as shown by the presence of a large amount of small, symmetrical ripples in certain parts of the formation. These lesser parts of the floodplain would have had a depth of around 70 cm.

The chemistry of the formation show soils that suggest that the area had a seasonal, semi-arid climate being similar to those seen in certain portions of Australia. This is suggested by the presence of analcime, which may form as a result of saline alkaline soils caused by that type of climate, along with calcrete. Due to the presence of calcrete specifically, it is estimated that the area that makes up the Aztec Siltstone would have received less than 50 cm of precipitation during the year. After the alluvial plane dried up, there would have been a period of time of around 4000 to 10000 years where the sediments would have been exposed to the air.
