= List of the Paleozoic life of Maryland =

This list of the Paleozoic life of Maryland contains the various prehistoric life-forms whose fossilized remains have been reported from within the US state of Maryland and are between 538.8 and 252.17 million years of age.

== A ==
- †Acanthopecten – tentative report
  - †Acanthopecten armigerus
  - †Acanthopecten carboniferus
- †Acanthotriletes
  - †Acanthotriletes pullus
- †Acoblatta – type locality for genus
  - †Acoblatta argillacea – type locality for species
- †Actinopteria
  - †Actinopteria boydi
  - †Actinopteria boydii
  - †Actinopteria decussata
- †Aglaoglypta
  - †Aglaoglypta maera
- †Ambloblatta – type locality for genus
  - †Ambloblatta bassleri – type locality for species
- †Ambocoelia
  - †Ambocoelia umbonata
- †Ambonychia
- †Amphiscapha
  - †Amphiscapha catilloides
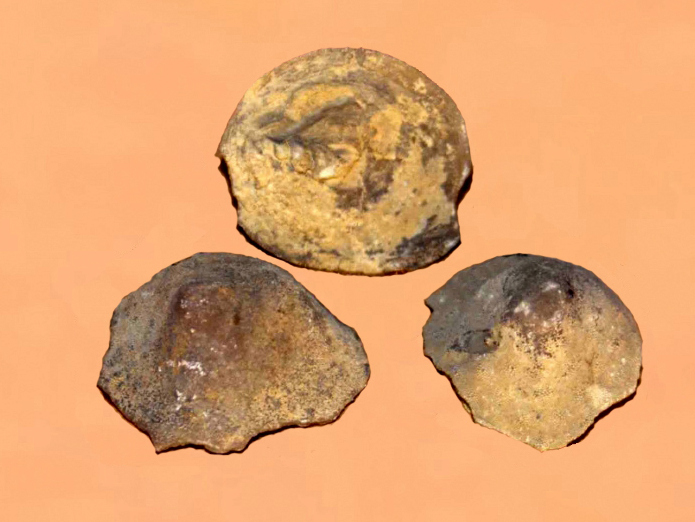
- Fossils of the Ordovician-Permian bryozoan Amplexopora
  †Amplexopora
- †Anapiculatisporites
  - †Anapiculatisporites crassisetus – type locality for species
- †Anazyga
  - †Anazyga recurvirostra – tentative report
- †Ancyrospora
  - †Ancyrospora ancyrea
- †Aneurospora
  - †Aneurospora semizonalis
- †Anoplotheca
- †Anthraconeilo
  - †Anthraconeilo taffiana
- †Aparchites
  - †Aparchites punctillosa
- †Archaeoscyphia
- †Archaeotriletes
  - †Archaeotriletes aduncus
- †Archaeozonotriletes
  - †Archaeozonotriletes notatus
- †Archimylacris
  - †Archimylacris delicata – type locality for species
- †Arthroacantha
  - †Arthroacantha punctobrachiata – or unidentified comparable form
- †Astartella
  - †Astartella concentrica
  - †Astartella vera
- †Atlanticocoelia
- †Atrypa
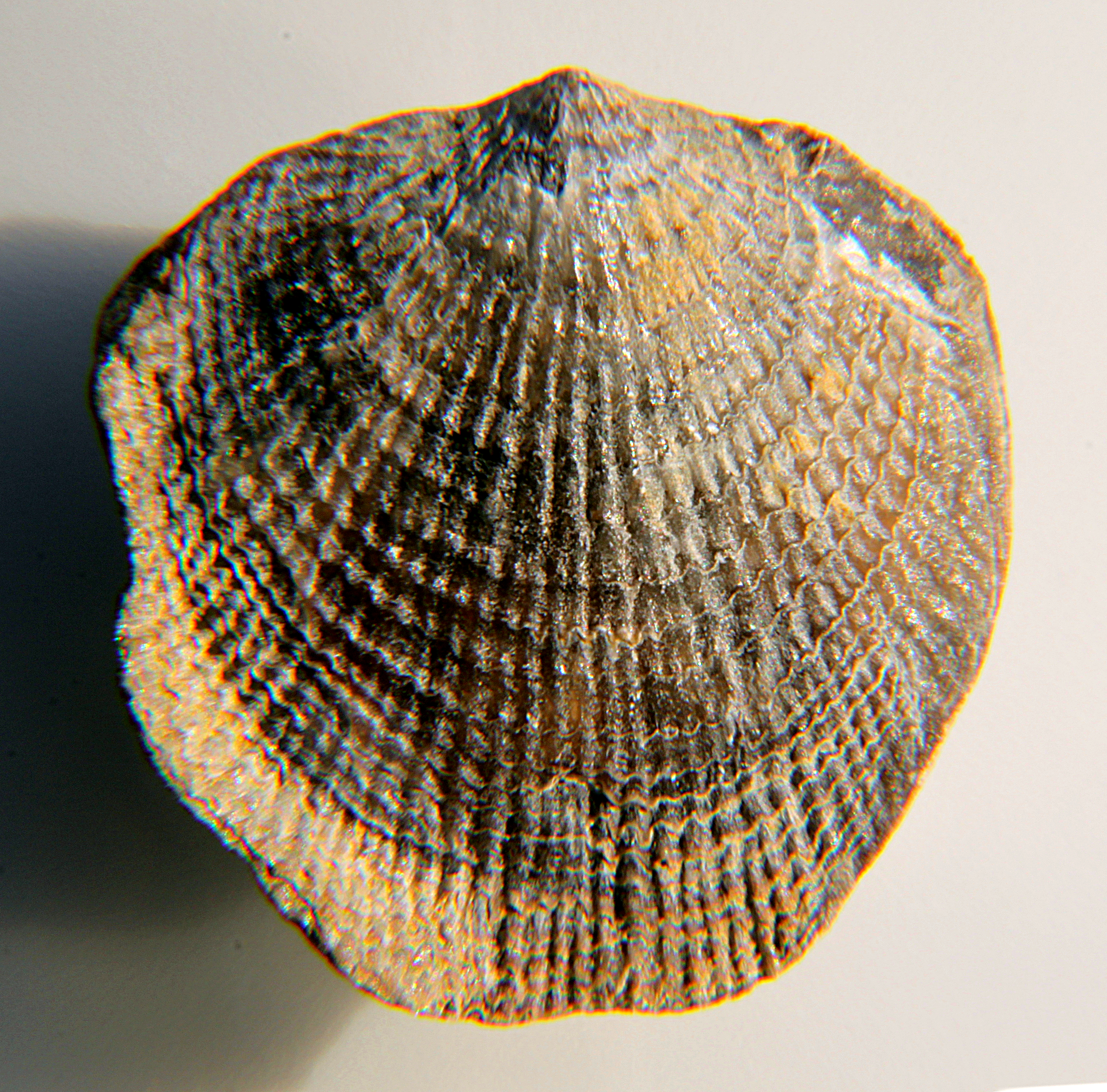
  - Fossilized shell of the Silurian-Late Devonian brachiopod Atrypa reticularis
    †Atrypa reticularis – report made of unidentified related form or using admittedly obsolete nomenclature
- †Aviculopecten

== B ==
- †Bactrites
- Bairdia
- †Bassipterus
  - †Bassipterus virginicus
- †Batostomella
- †Bellefontia
  - †Bellefontia collieana – tentative report
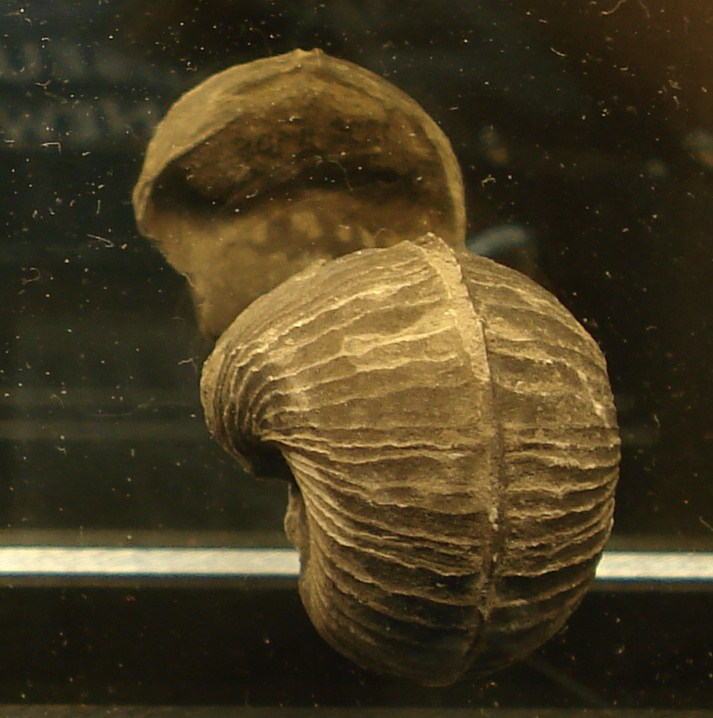
- Fossilized shell of the Silurian-Early Triassic mollusc Bellerophon
  †Bellerophon
  - †Bellerophon clarki
- †Beyrichia
  - †Beyrichia moodeyi
  - †Beyrichia veronica
- †Biharisporites
  - †Biharisporites maguashensis
- †Bolbiprimitia
- †Bollia
  - †Bollia immersa
  - †Bollia nitida
  - †Bollia pulchella
- †Bonnemaia
  - †Bonnemaia celsa
  - †Bonnemaia perlonga
- †Brachymylacris
  - †Brachymylacris martini – type locality for species
- †Brochotriletes
- †Bucania – tentative report
- †Buthotrephis
  - †Buthotrephis gracilis
- †Buthrotrephis
- †Byssonychia
  - †Byssonychia radiata
- Bythocypris
  - †Bythocypris obesa
  - †Bythocypris pergracilis

== C ==
- †Calamospora
  - †Calamospora atava
  - †Calamospora nigrata
- †Calymene
  - †Calymene camerata
  - †Calymene cresapensis
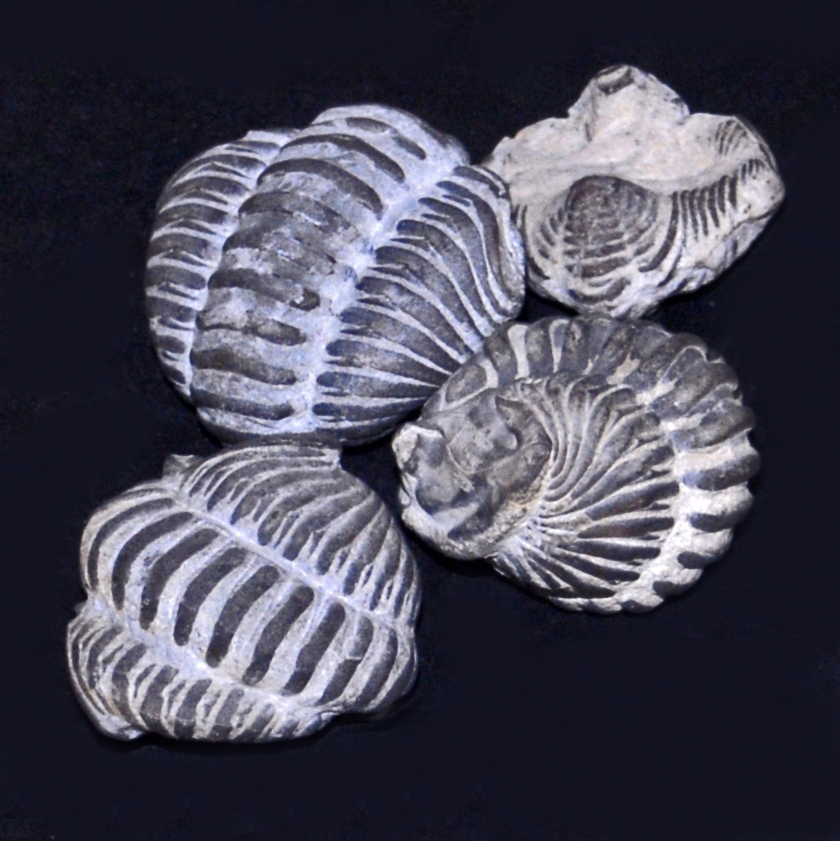
  - Fossils in enrolled posture of the Silurian trilobite Calymene niagarensis
    †Calymene niagarensis – or unidentified comparable form
  - †Calymene niagraensis
- †Camarotoechia
  - †Camarotoechia andrewsi
  - †Camarotoechia litchfieldensis
  - †Camarotoechia tonolowayensis
- †Cariniferella
  - †Cariniferella carinata
- †Cavellina
- †Ceratopea
- †Cheliphlebia – tentative report
  - †Cheliphlebia argillacea – type locality for species
- †Chonetes
  - †Chonetes novascoticus
- †Chonetina
  - †Chonetina verneuilianus
- †Chonostrophia
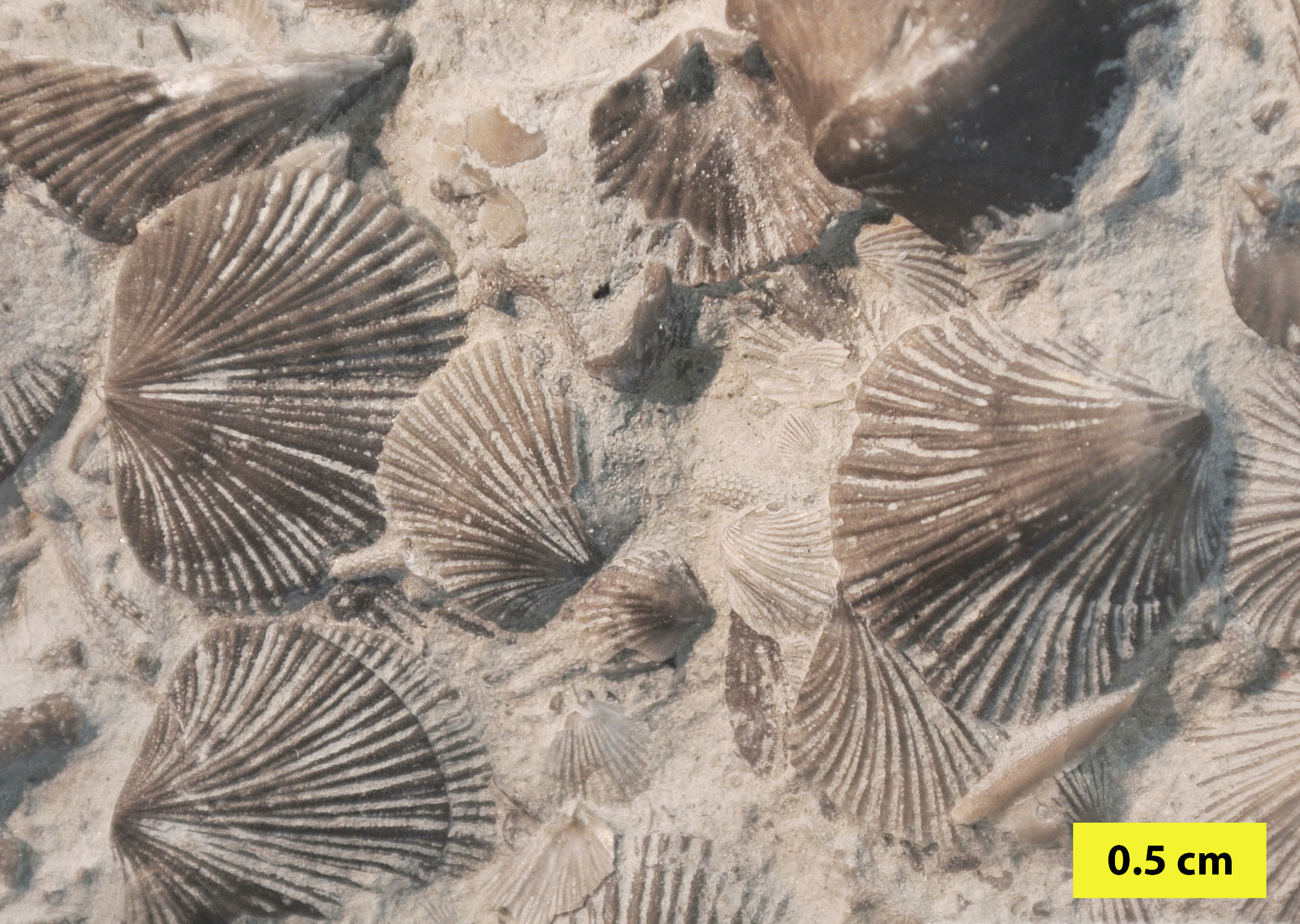
- Assemblage of fossilized shells of the Ordovician brachiopod Cincinnetina
  †Cincinnetina
  - †Cincinnetina multisecta
- †Clidophorus
  - †Clidophorus nitidus
- †Clitendoceras
- †Coelospira
  - †Coelospira nitens
  - †Coelospira sulcata
- †Composita
  - †Composita ovata – tentative report
- †Conularia
  - †Conularia niagarensis
- †Convolutispora
  - †Convolutispora subtilis
- †Coreanoceras
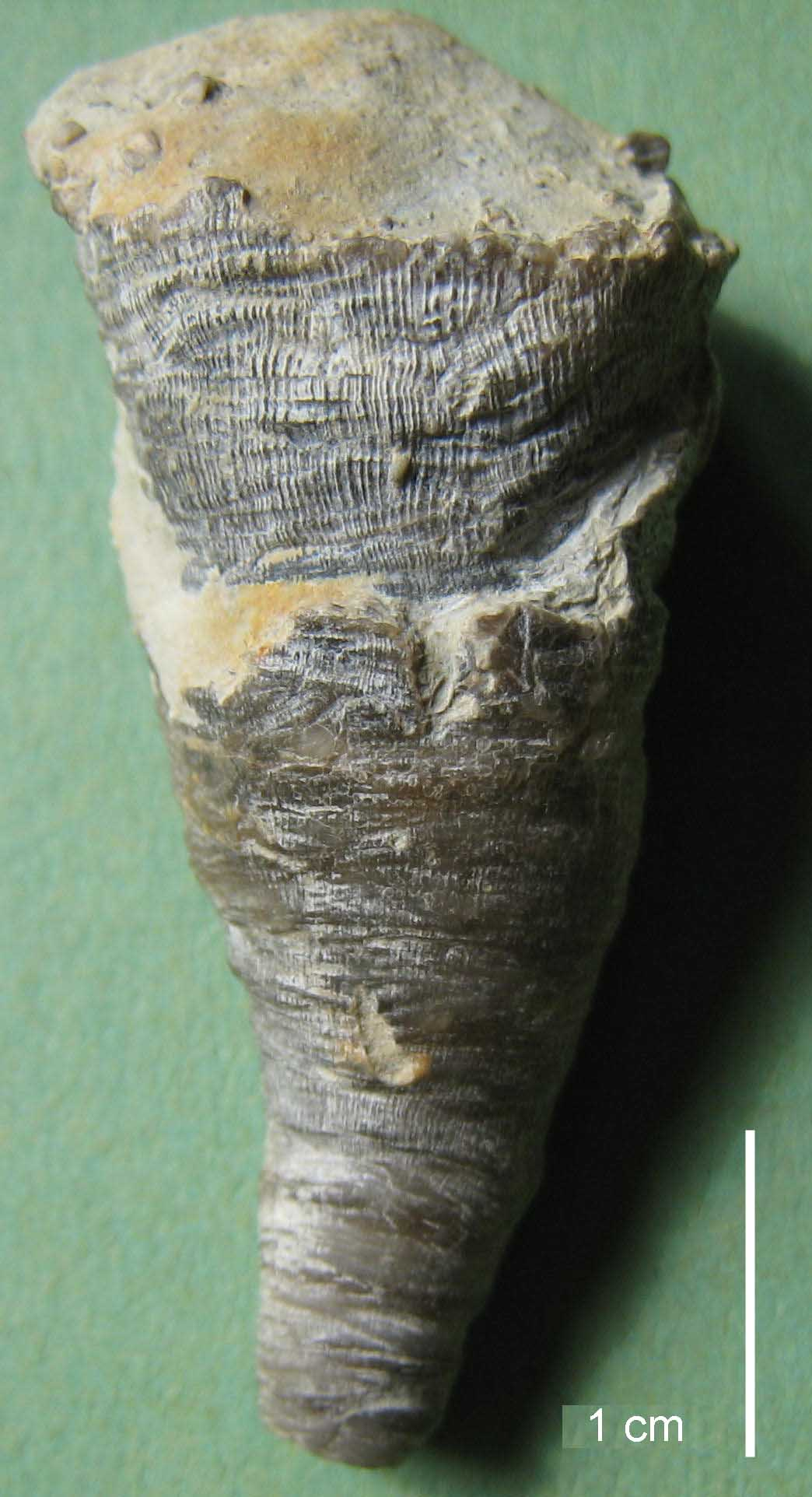
- Fossil of the Middle Ordovician-Carboniferous horn coral Cornulites
  †Cornulites
  - †Cornulites concavus
  - †Cornulites rosehillensis
- †Corvellites
- †Crurithyris
  - †Crurithyris planoconvexa
- †Cryptolithus
- †Ctenodonta
  - †Ctenodonta subreniformis
- †Culunana
  - †Culunana attenuata
- †Cupularostrum
  - †Cupularostrum contracta
- †Cyathophyllum
- †Cymatospira
  - †Cymatospira montfortianus
- †Cyphomylacris – type locality for genus
  - †Cyphomylacris atrata – type locality for species
- †Cyphotrypa
- †Cypricardella
  - †Cypricardella crassa
  - †Cypricardella cumberlandiae
  - †Cypricardella gregaria
  - †Cypricardella nitidula
  - †Cypricardella tenuistriata
- †Cypricardinia
  - †Cypricardinia elegans
- †Cyrtina
- †Cyrtodontula
  - †Cyrtodontula subtruncata

== D ==
- †Dakeoceras
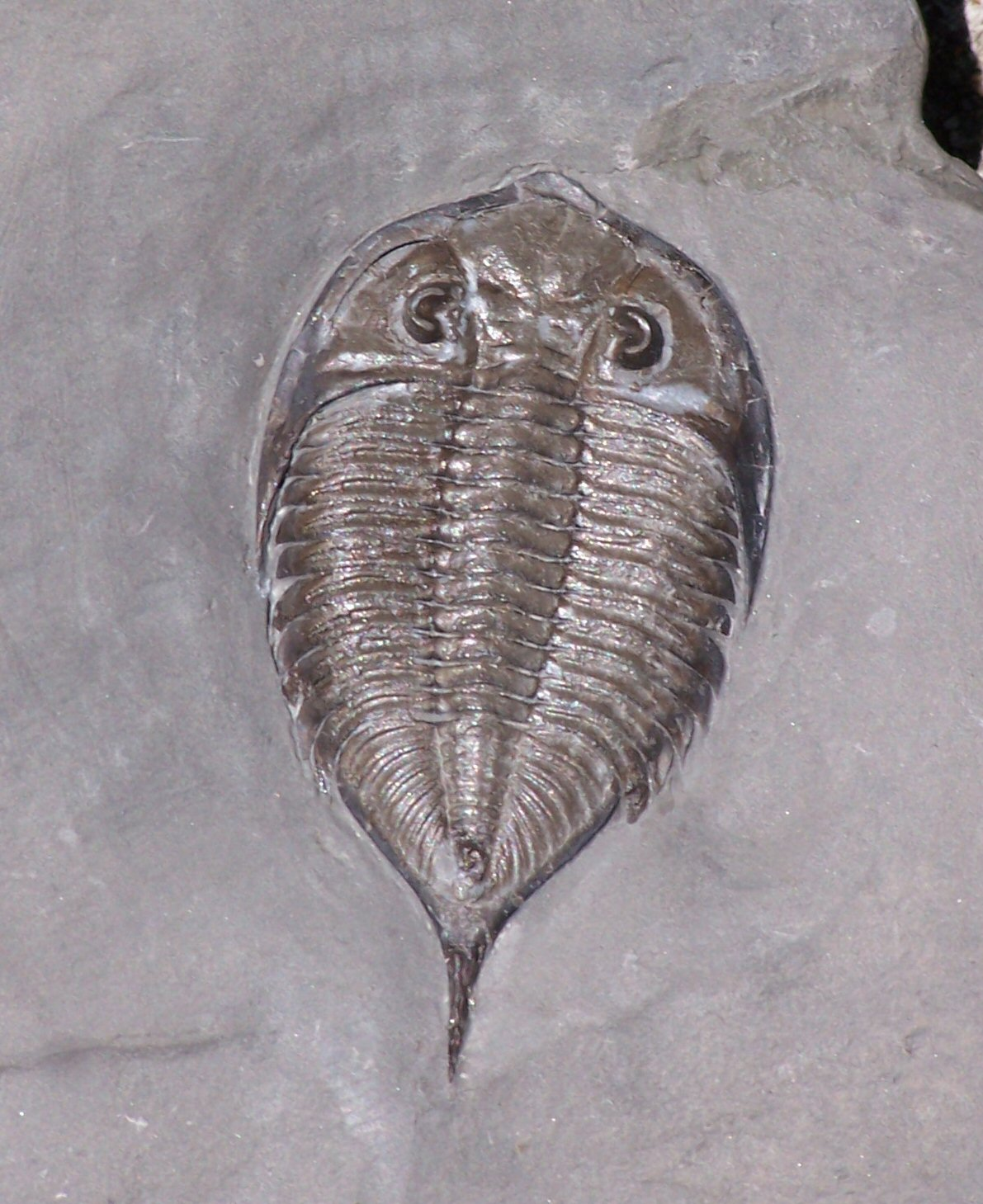
- Fossil of the Late Ordovician-Middle Devonian trilobite Dalmanites
  †Dalmanites
  - †Dalmanites limulurus
- †Dekayia
- †Delthyris
  - †Delthyris vanuxemi
- †Derbyia
  - †Derbyia crassa
- †Diaphanospora
  - †Diaphanospora reticulatus
- †Diaphelasma
- †Dibolbina
  - †Dibolbina cristata
- †Dictyotriletes
- †Dinoblatta – type locality for genus
  - †Dinoblatta cubitalis – type locality for species
  - †Dinoblatta fortis – type locality for species
- †Diparelasma
- †Dizygopleura
  - †Dizygopleura acuminata
  - †Dizygopleura carinata
  - †Dizygopleura conjugata
  - †Dizygopleura costata
  - †Dizygopleura gibba
  - †Dizygopleura halli
  - †Dizygopleura intermedia
  - †Dizygopleura micula
  - †Dizygopleura perrugosa
  - †Dizygopleura pricei
  - †Dizygopleura proutyi
  - †Dizygopleura simulans
  - †Dizygopleura subdivisa
  - †Dizygopleura subovalis
  - †Dizygopleura swartzi
  - †Dizygopleura symmetrica
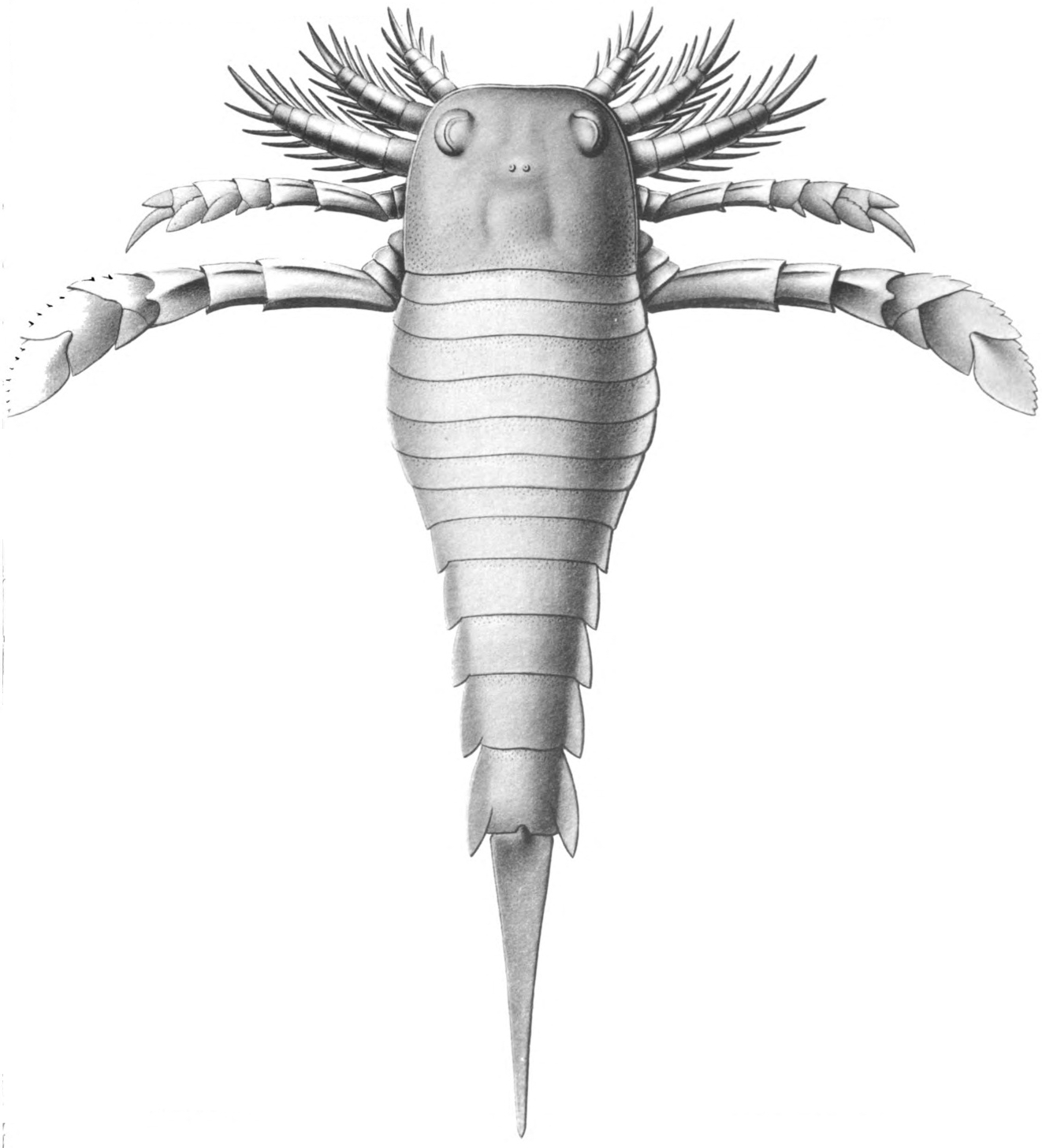
- Life restoration of the Silurian eurypterid ("sea scorpion") Dolichopterus
  †Dolichopterus
- †Doloresella
- †Donaldina
  - †Donaldina stevensana
- †Drepanellina
  - †Drepanellina clarki
  - †Drepanellina ventralis
- †Dunbarella
  - †Dunbarella striata – type locality for species

== E ==
- †Ecculiomphalus
- †Edmondia
  - †Edmondia aspenwallensis
  - †Edmondia pseudoreflexa – type locality for species
- †Eldredgeops
  - †Eldredgeops rana
- †Elita
- †Ellesmeroceras
- †Emphanisporites
  - †Emphanisporites annulatus
  - †Emphanisporites rotatus
- †Encrinurus
  - †Encrinurus ornatus
- †Endocycloceras
  - †Endocycloceras legorense
- †Eospirifer
  - †Eospirifer crispus
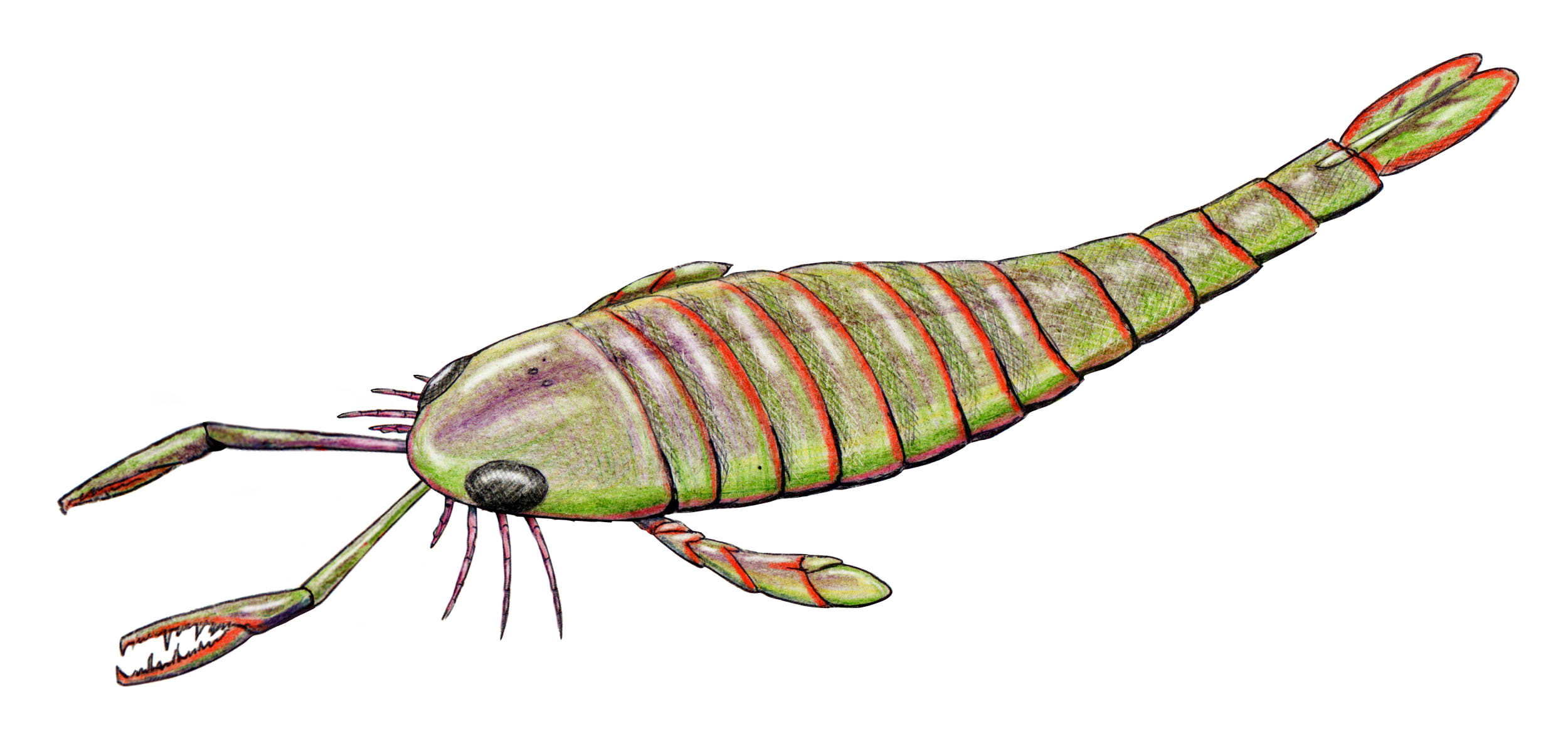
- Life restoration of the Silurian-Early Devonian eurypterid ("sea scorpion") Erettopterus
  †Erettopterus – tentative report
- †Escharendoceras
- †Euchondria
  - †Euchondria levicula – tentative report
- †Eukloedenella
  - †Eukloedenella elongata
  - †Eukloedenella punctillosa
  - †Eukloedenella sinuata
  - †Eukloedenella sulcifrons
  - †Eukloedenella umbilicata
- †Euomphalus
- †Euphemites
  - †Euphemites vittatus
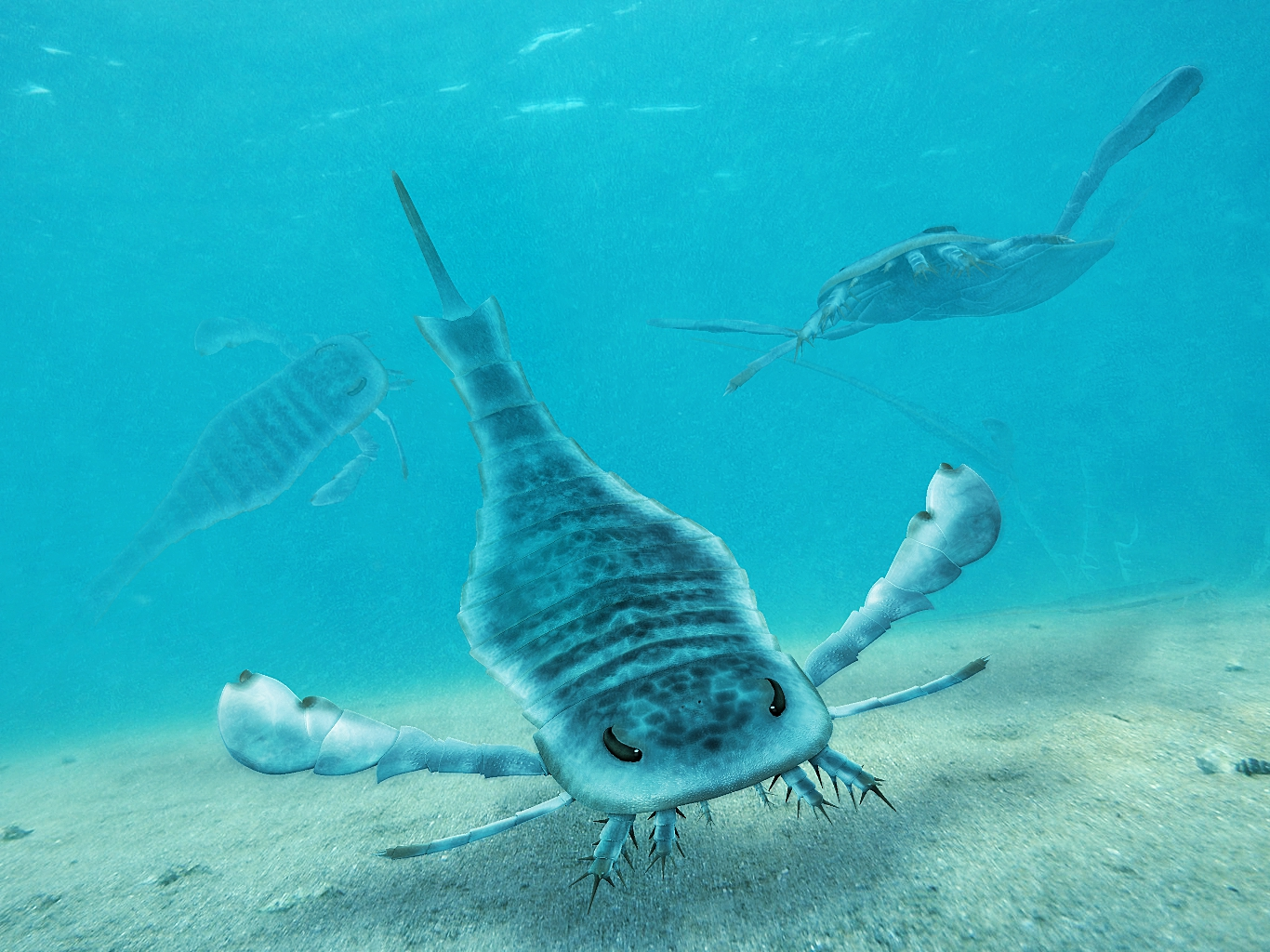
- Life restoration of Silurian eurypterid ("sea scorpion") Eurypterus
  †Eurypterus
  - †Eurypterus remipes
- †Euthydesma

== F ==
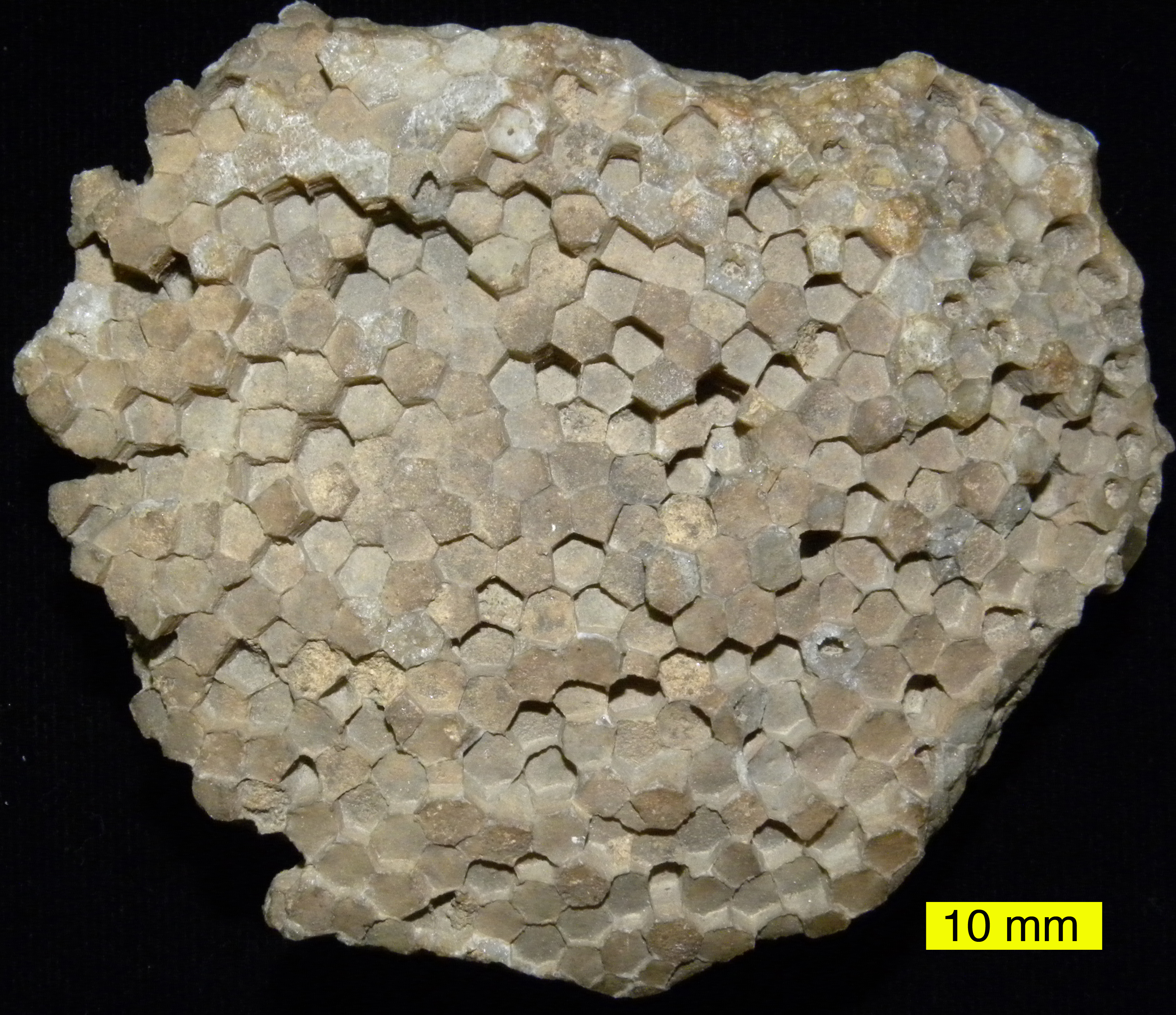
- Fossil of the Late Ordovician-Permian tabulate coral Favosites
  †Favosites
  - †Favosites niagarensis – or unidentified comparable form
- †Finkelnburgia
  - †Finkelnburgia virginica – tentative report
- †Fistulipora
- †Flexicalymene
- †Floweria
  - †Floweria chemungensis
- †Foveosporites
  - †Foveosporites insculptus

== G ==
- †Gasconadia
  - †Gasconadia putilla
- †Geminospora
  - †Geminospora svalbardiae
  - †Geminospora tuberculata
- †Girtyspira
  - †Girtyspira minuta
- †Glabrocingulum
  - †Glabrocingulum grayvillense
  - †Glabrocingulum ornatum
- †Glyptoglossella
  - †Glyptoglossella cavellosa
- †Glyptorthis
  - †Glyptorthis equiconvexa – type locality for species
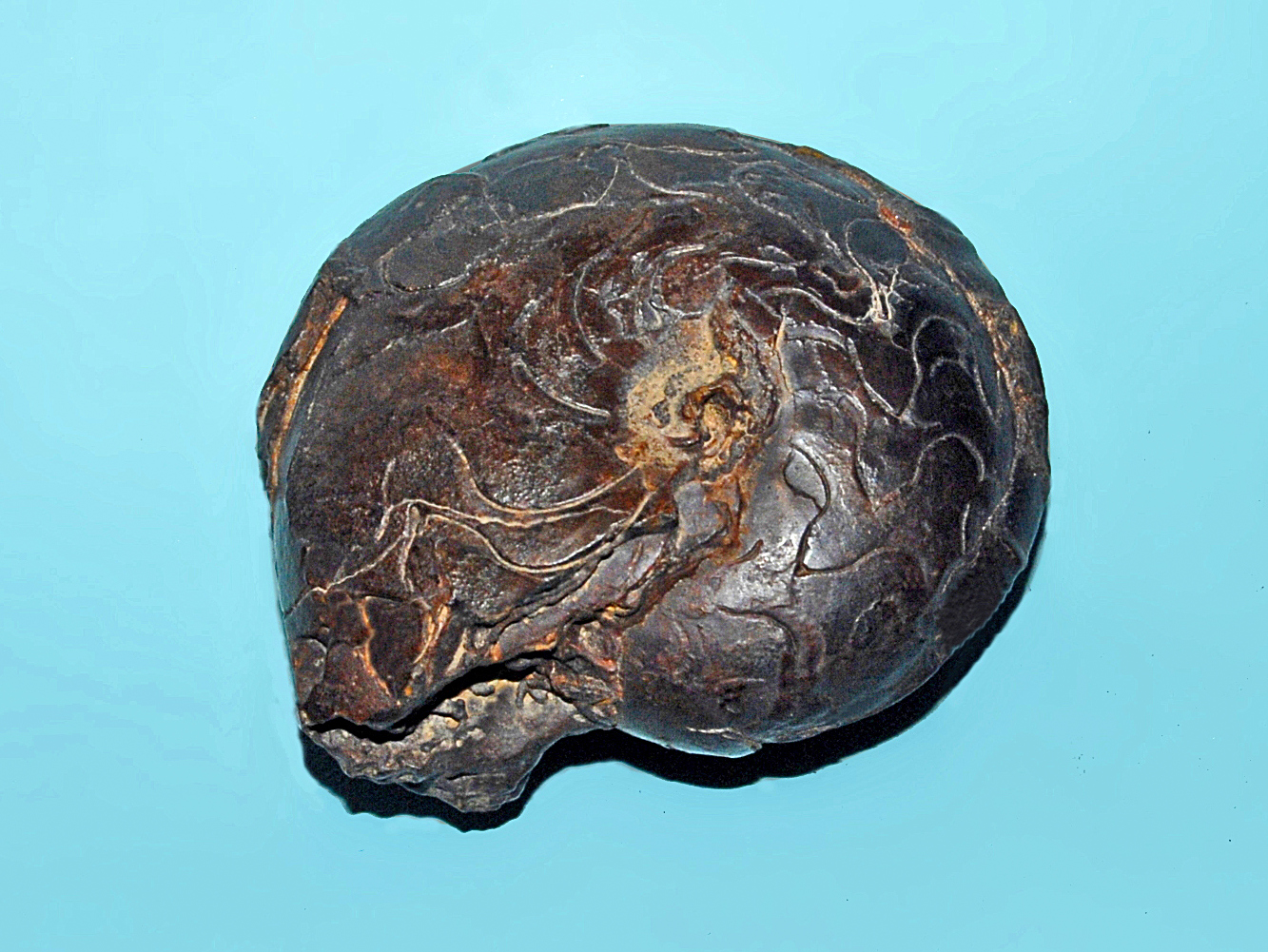
- Fossilized shell of the Late Devonian-Late Triassic ammonoid cephalopod Goniatites
  †Goniatites
- †Grammysia
- †Gyrodoma
  - †Gyrodoma marylandica

== H ==
- †Halliella
  - †Halliella fissurella
  - †Halliella subequata
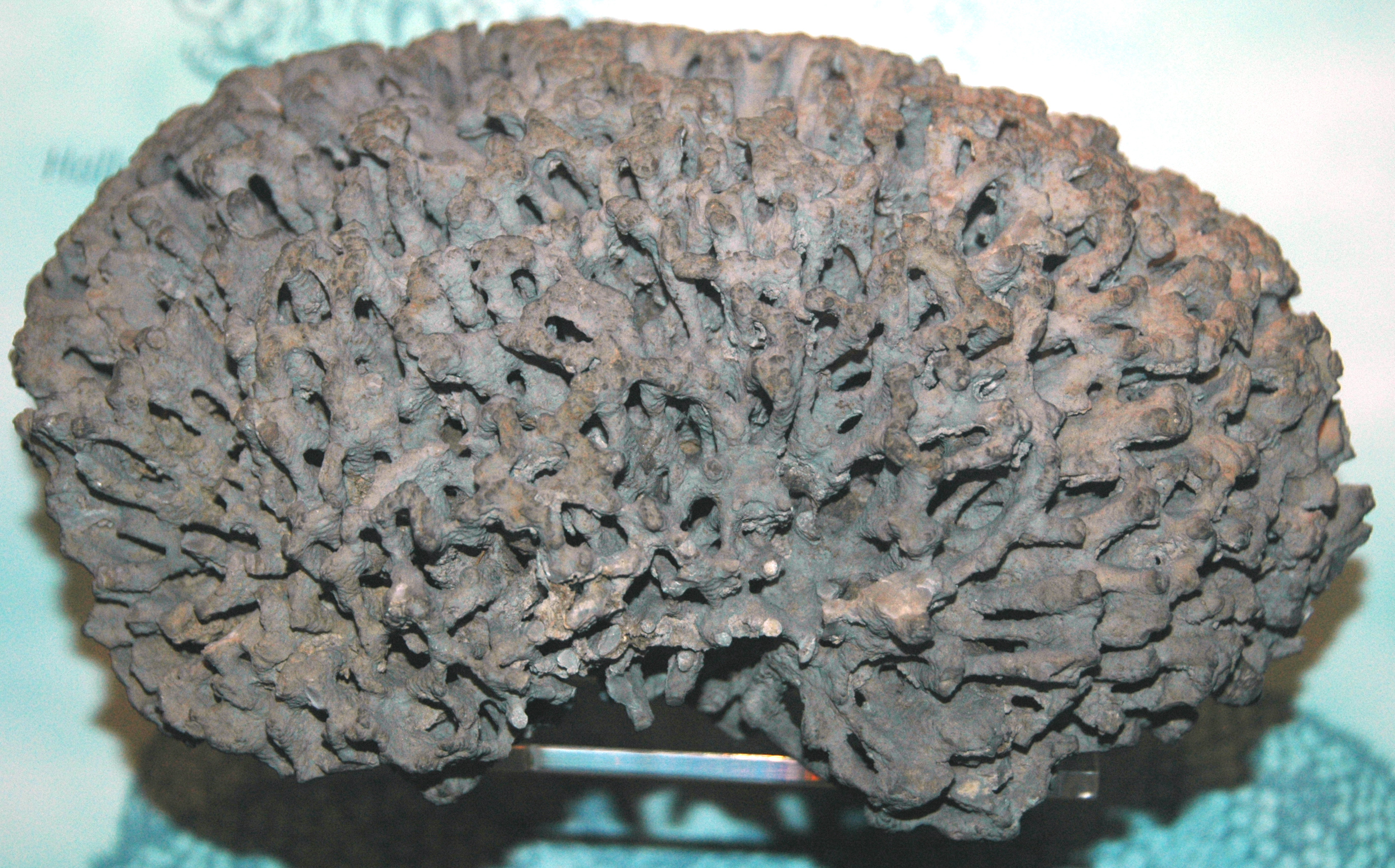
- Fossil of the Ordovician bryozoan ("moss animal") Hallopora
  †Hallopora
- †Healdia
- †Hebertella
  - †Hebertella sinuata
- †Hemimylacris – type locality for genus
  - †Hemimylacris bassleri – type locality for species
- †Heterotrypa
- †Hindella
  - †Hindella congregata
- †Hippocardia
  - †Hippocardia cumberlandiae – type locality for species
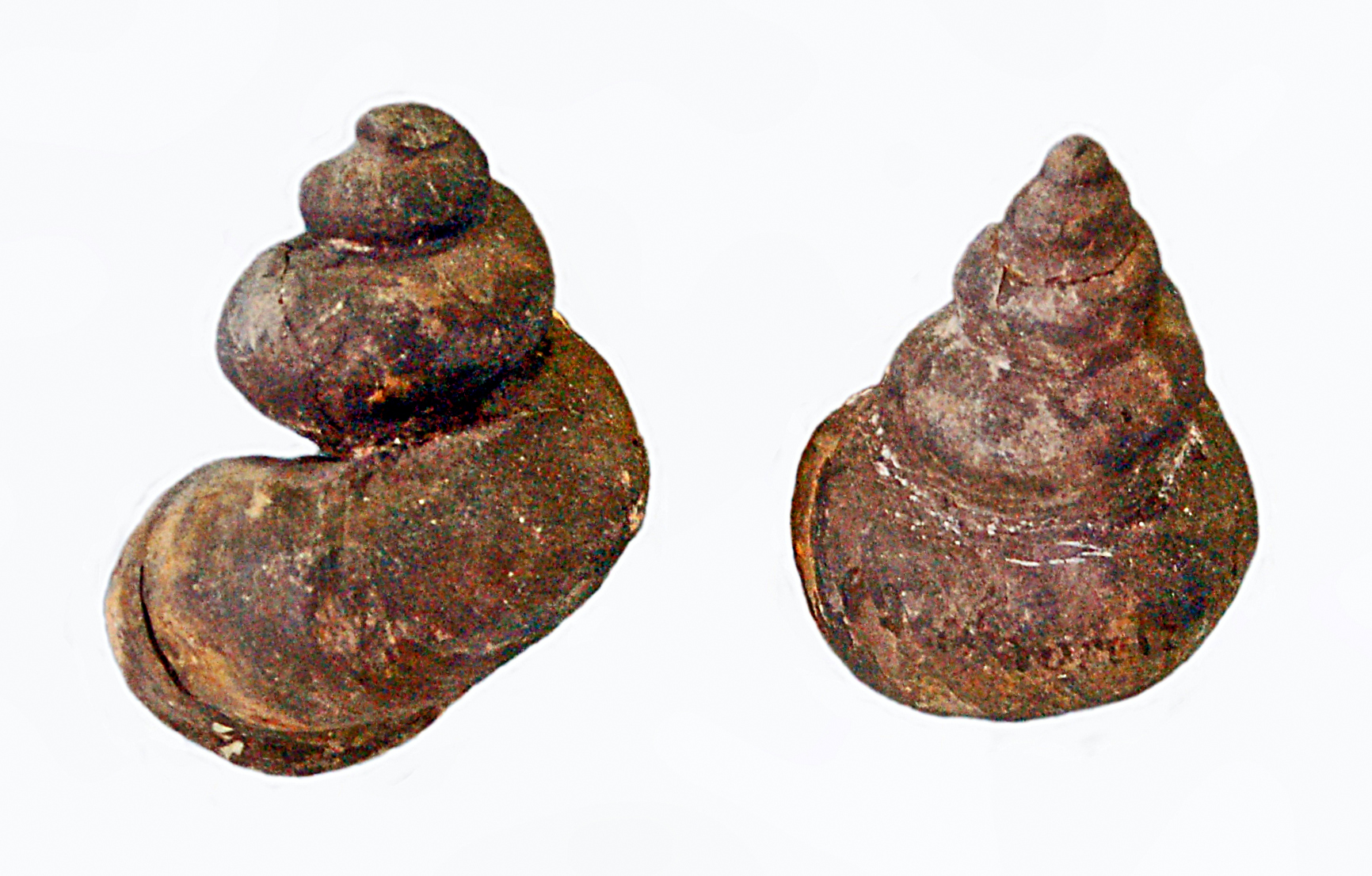
- Fossilized shells of the Ordovician-Carboniferous sea snail Holopea
  †Holopea
- †Homeospira
  - †Homeospira evax
- †Hormotoma
  - †Hormotoma hopkinsi
  - †Hormotoma rowei
- †Hyolithes
- †Hystricosporites
  - †Hystricosporites porcatus
- †Hystriculina – tentative report
  - †Hystriculina wabashensis
- †Hystricurus

== I ==
- †Inaperaturate
- †Ischyrodonta – tentative report
  - †Ischyrodonta truncata
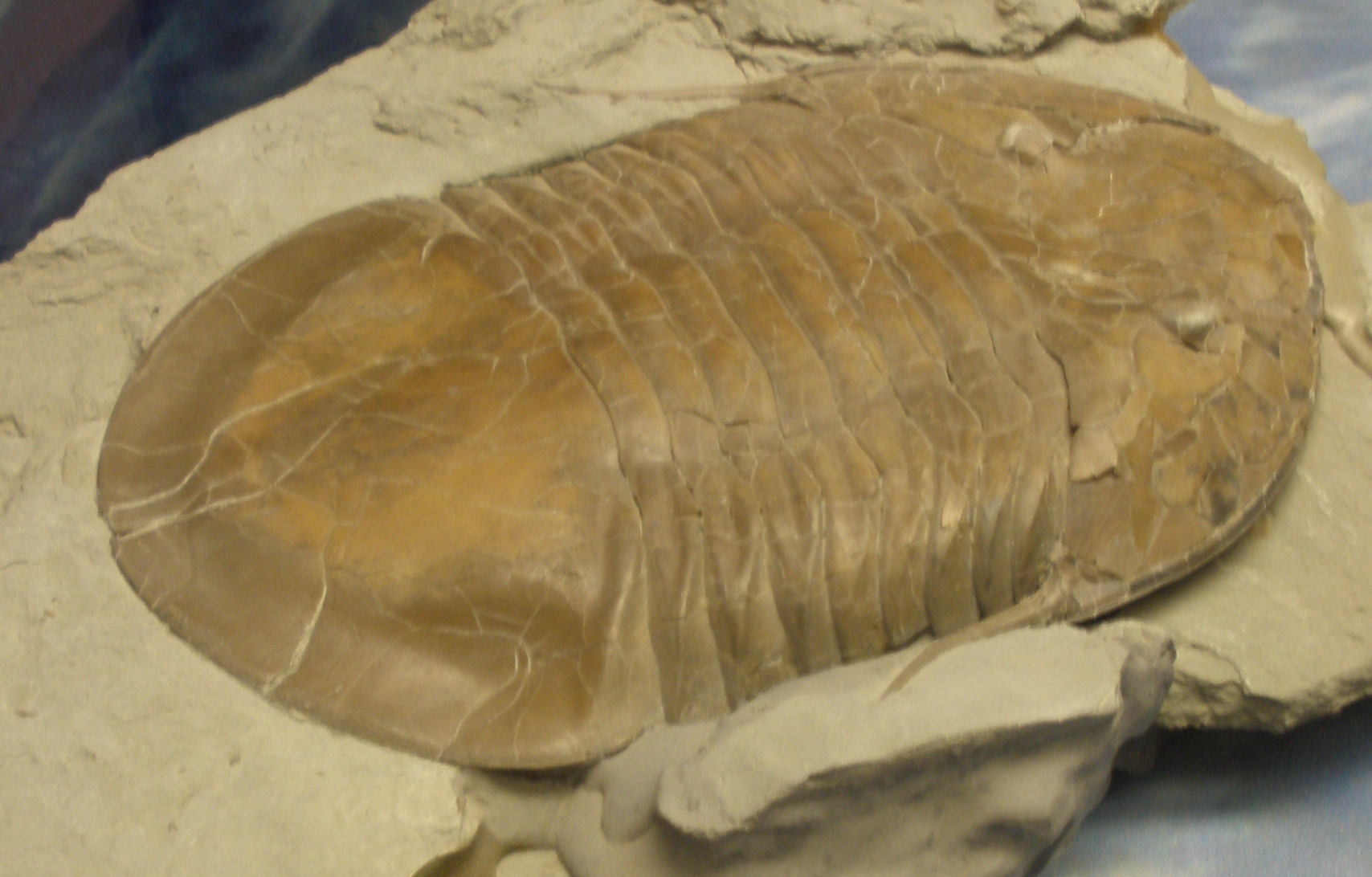
- Fossil of the Middle-Late Ordovician giant trilobite Isotelus.
  †Isotelus

== J ==
- †Juresania
  - †Juresania symmetrica – tentative report

== K ==
- †Kitikamispira
  - †Kitikamispira concinna
  - †Kitikamispira multistriata
- †Kloedenella
  - †Kloedenella cornuta
  - †Kloedenella immersa
  - †Kloedenella intermedia
  - †Kloedenella nitida
- †Kloedenia
  - †Kloedenia normalis
- †Kyammodes
  - †Kyammodes swartzi

== L ==
- †Lasiocrinus
  - †Lasiocrinus scoparius – or unidentified comparable form
- †Lecanospira
  - †Lecanospira compacta – tentative report
- †Leiorhynchus
- †Leperditia
  - †Leperditia alta
  - †Leperditia elongata
- †Leptaena
  - †Leptaena rhomboidalis – report made of unidentified related form or using admittedly obsolete nomenclature
- †Lepterditia
- †Leptodesma
  - †Leptodesma marylandica
  - †Leptodesma naviforme
  - †Leptodesma nitida
  - †Leptodesma spinerigum
  - †Leptodesma subplana – or unidentified comparable form
- †Leptostrophia
  - †Leptostrophia proutyi
- †Lesueurilla
- †Levenea
- †Lichenaria
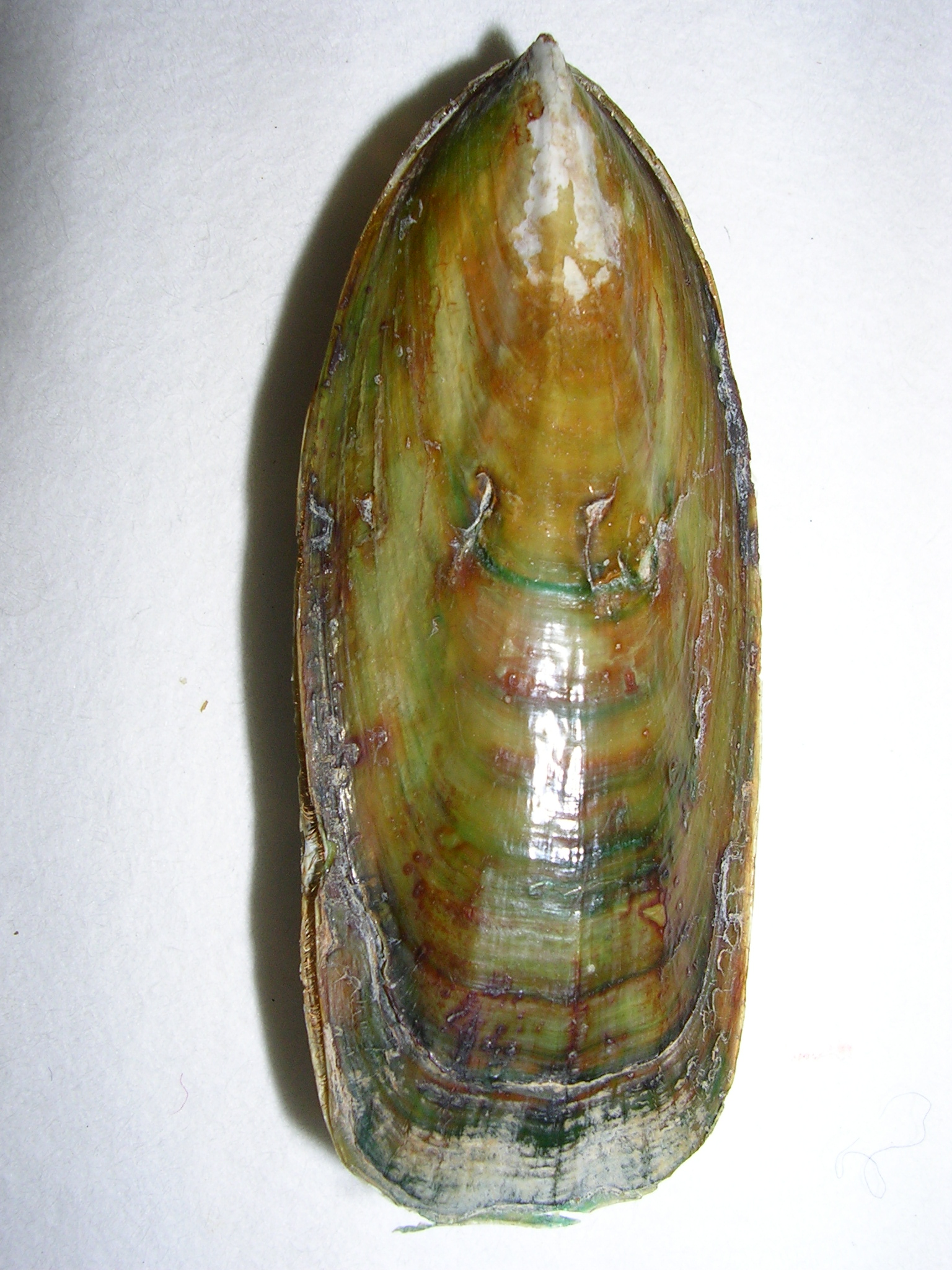
- Shell of the Cambrian-modern brachiopod Lingula
  †Lingula
  - †Lingula carbonaria
  - †Lingula gracilis
- †Linoproductus
  - †Linoproductus prattenianus
- †Liocalymene
  - †Liocalymene clintoni
- †Lobosiphon
- †Longispina
- †Lophotriletes
  - †Lophotriletes atratus
- †Loxonema
- †Lyrodesma
  - †Lyrodesma poststriatum
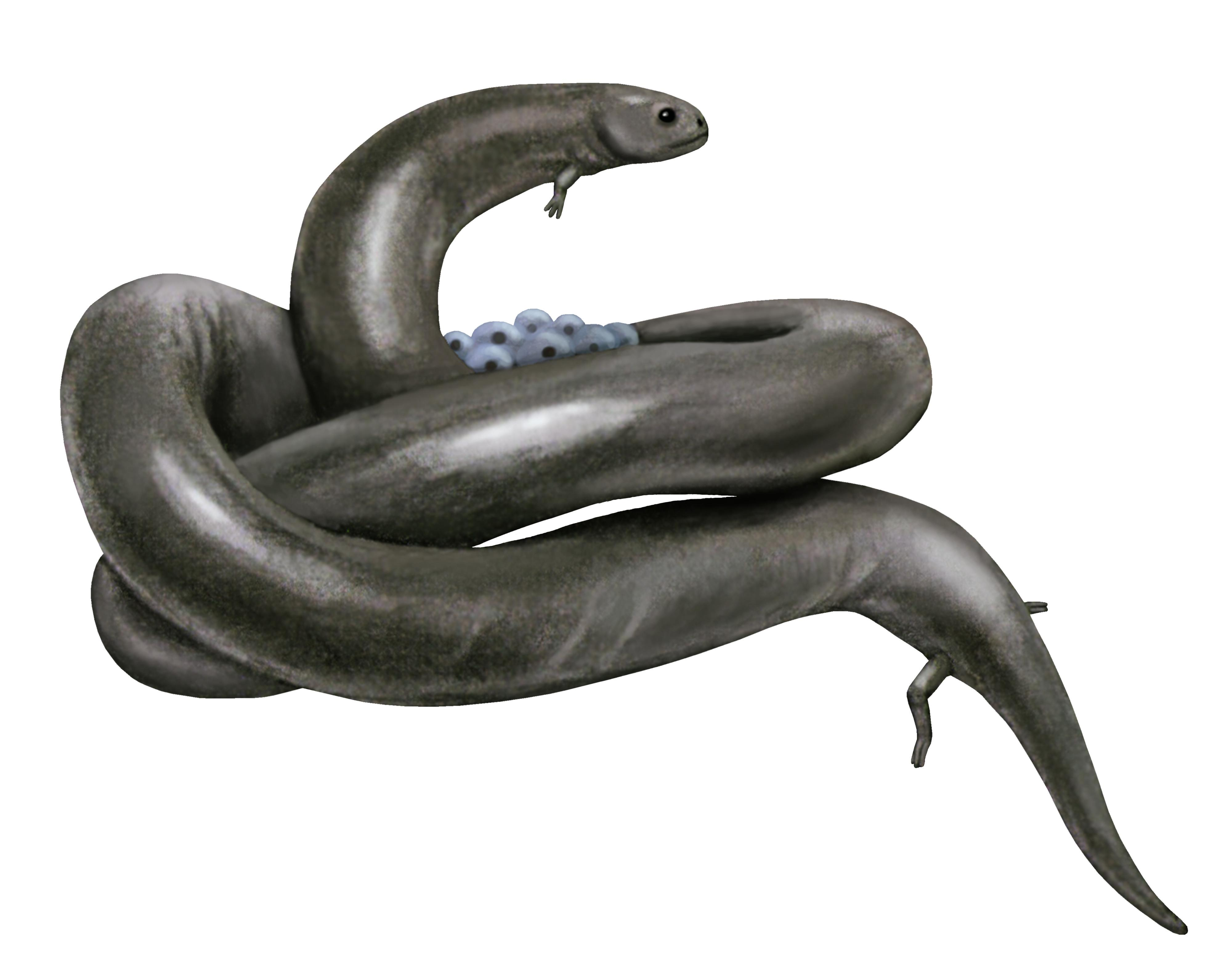
- Life restoration of the Permian snake-like amphibian Lysorophus showing speculative egg-coiling behavior
  †Lysorophus
- †Lytospira

== M ==
- †Macluritella
  - †Macluritella marylandica – type locality for species
- †Mastigobolbina
  - †Mastigobolbina arguta
  - †Mastigobolbina lata
  - †Mastigobolbina typus
- †Mcqueenoceras
- †Meekospira
  - †Meekospira percuta – or unidentified related form
- †Megamolgophis
  - †Megamolgophis agostini
- †Melanoblattula – type locality for genus
  - †Melanoblattula nigrescens – type locality for species
- †Meristina
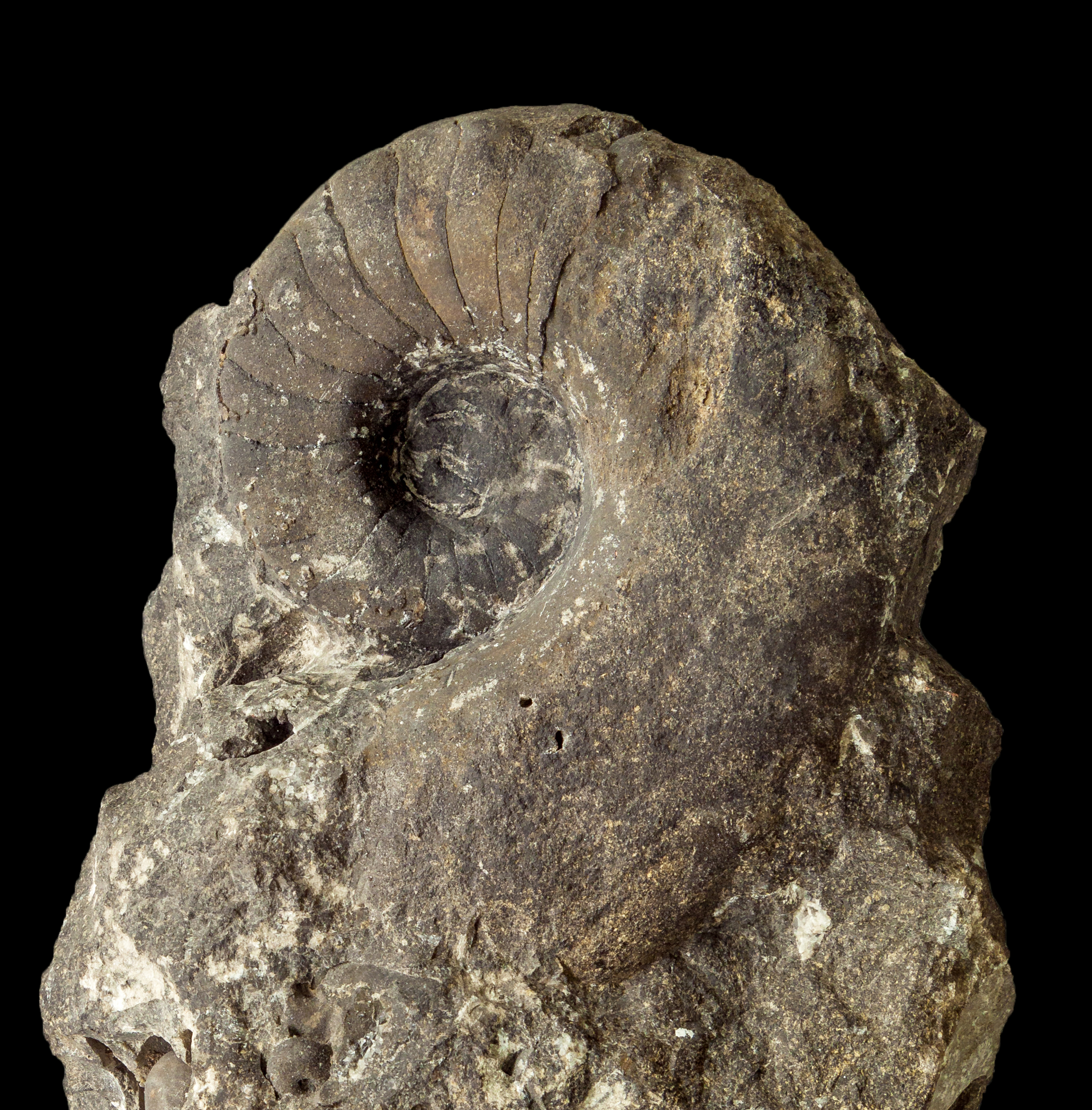
- Fossilized shell of the Carboniferous-Permian nautiloid cephalopod Metacoceras
  †Metacoceras
  - †Metacoceras marylandica – type locality for species
- †Modiolopsis
  - †Modiolopsis gregarius
  - †Modiolopsis leightoni
  - †Modiolopsis modiolaris
- †Modiomorpha
- †Monticulipora
- †Mylacris
  - †Mylacris lapsa – type locality for species
- †Mysticoceras

== N ==
- †Narkema
  - †Narkema alternatum – type locality for species
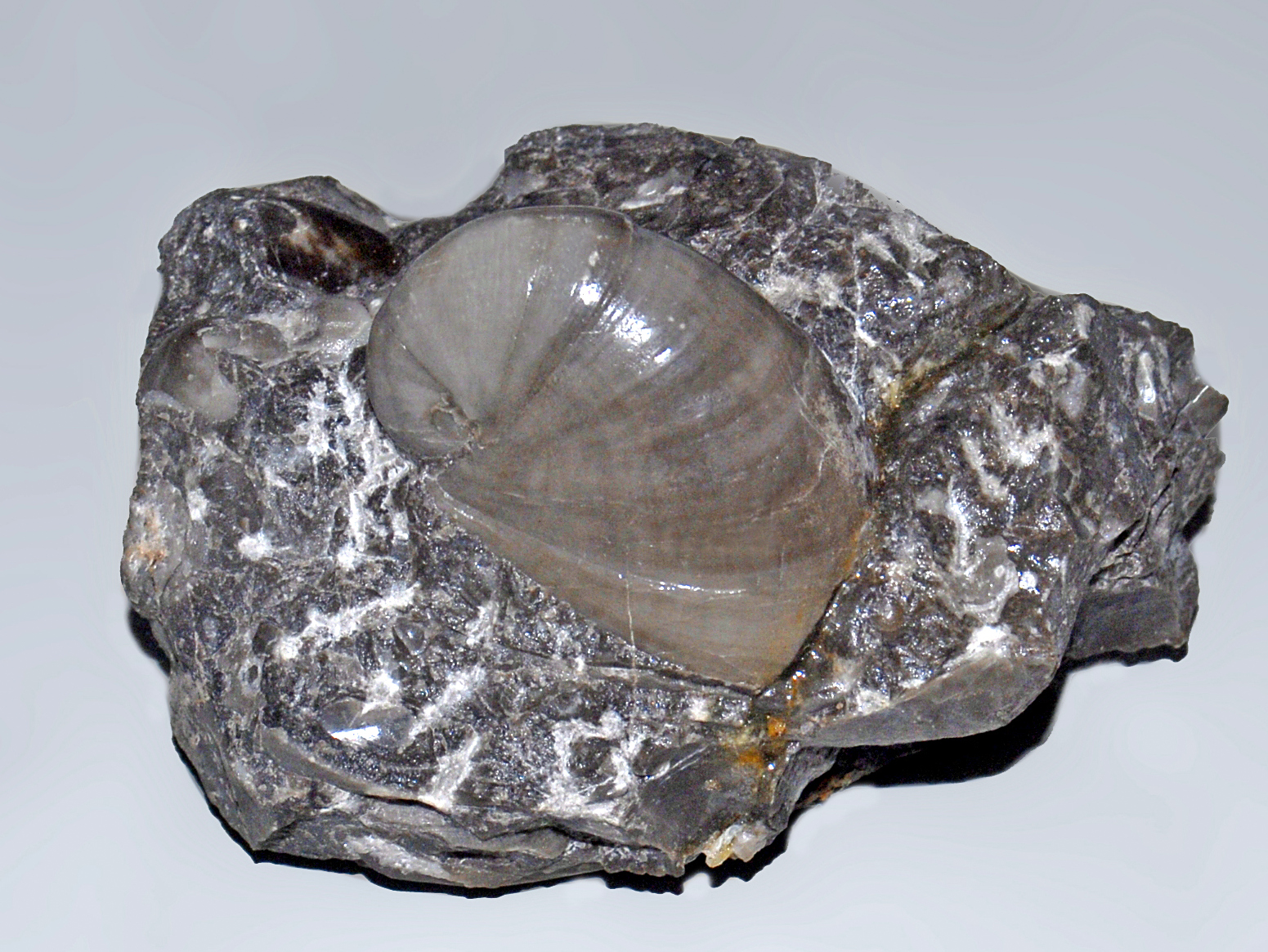
- Fossilized shell of the Early Devonian – Triassic sea snail Naticopsis
  †Naticopsis
- †Neochonetes
  - †Neochonetes granulifer
- †Neospirifer
  - †Neospirifer dunbari – tentative report
- †Nucleospira
- †Nucularca
  - †Nucularca pectunculoides
- †Nuculites
- †Nuculopsis
  - †Nuculopsis anadontoides
  - †Nuculopsis girtyi

== O ==
- †Obolella
- †Obolus – tentative report
- †Ochetopteron – type locality for genus
  - †Ochetopteron canaliculatum – type locality for species
- †Octonaria
  - †Octonaria muricata
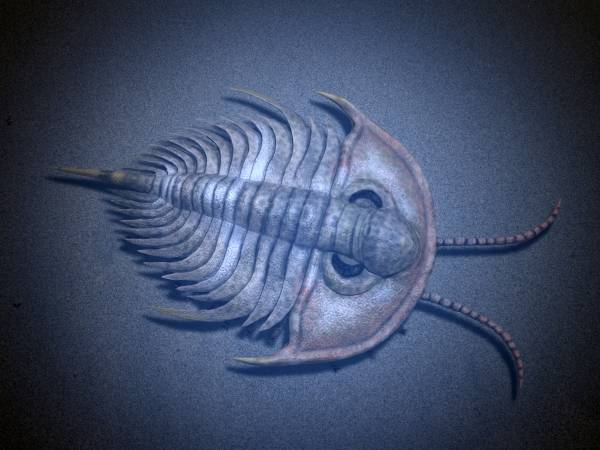
- Restoration of the Cambrian trilobite Olenellus
  †Olenellus
- †Olethroblatta
  - †Olethroblatta lineolata – type locality for species
- †Ophileta
- †Orbiculoidea
  - †Orbiculoidea missouriensis – tentative report
- †Ormoceras
  - †Ormoceras neumani
- †Orospira
- †Orthoceras
  - †Orthoceras mackenzicum
- †Orthomylacris
  - †Orthomylacris berryi – type locality for species
  - †Orthomylacris recta – type locality for species
- †Orthonychia
  - †Orthonychia prosseri
  - †Orthonychia unguiculata
- †Orthopora
- †Orthorhynchula
  - †Orthorhynchula linneyi

== P ==
- †Pachyblatta – type locality for genus
  - †Pachyblatta convexa – type locality for species
  - †Pachyblatta radiata – type locality for species
- †Palaeoneilo
  - †Palaeoneilo angusta
  - †Palaeoneilo brevis
  - †Palaeoneilo clarkei
  - †Palaeoneilo constricta
  - †Palaeoneilo crassa
  - †Palaeoneilo petila
  - †Palaeoneilo plana
- †Palaeozygopleura
  - †Palaeozygopleura glabra – tentative report
  - †Palaeozygopleura hamiltoniae
  - †Palaeozygopleura styliola
  - †Palaeozygopleura terebra
- †Paleonucula
  - †Paleonucula croneisi
- †Paleyoldia – type locality for genus
  - †Paleyoldia glabra
- †Paracyclas
  - †Paracyclas lirata
- †Paraechmina
  - †Paraechmina abnormis
  - †Paraechmina crassa
  - †Paraechmina depressa
  - †Paraechmina postica
  - †Paraechmina spinosa
- †Parajuresania
  - †Parajuresania nebrascensis – tentative report
- †Parallelodon
  - †Parallelodon tenuistriata
- †Patellilabia
  - †Patellilabia tentoriolum – tentative report
- †Permophorus
  - †Permophorus oblongus
- †Peronopora – tentative report
- †Pharkidonotus
  - †Pharkidonotus percarinatus
- †Pholidops
  - †Pholidops squamiformis
- †Pholidostrophia
- †Phragmosiphon
- †Phymatopleura
  - †Phymatopleura brazonensis
- †Pintopsis
- †Plagioglypta
  - †Plagioglypta annulostriata
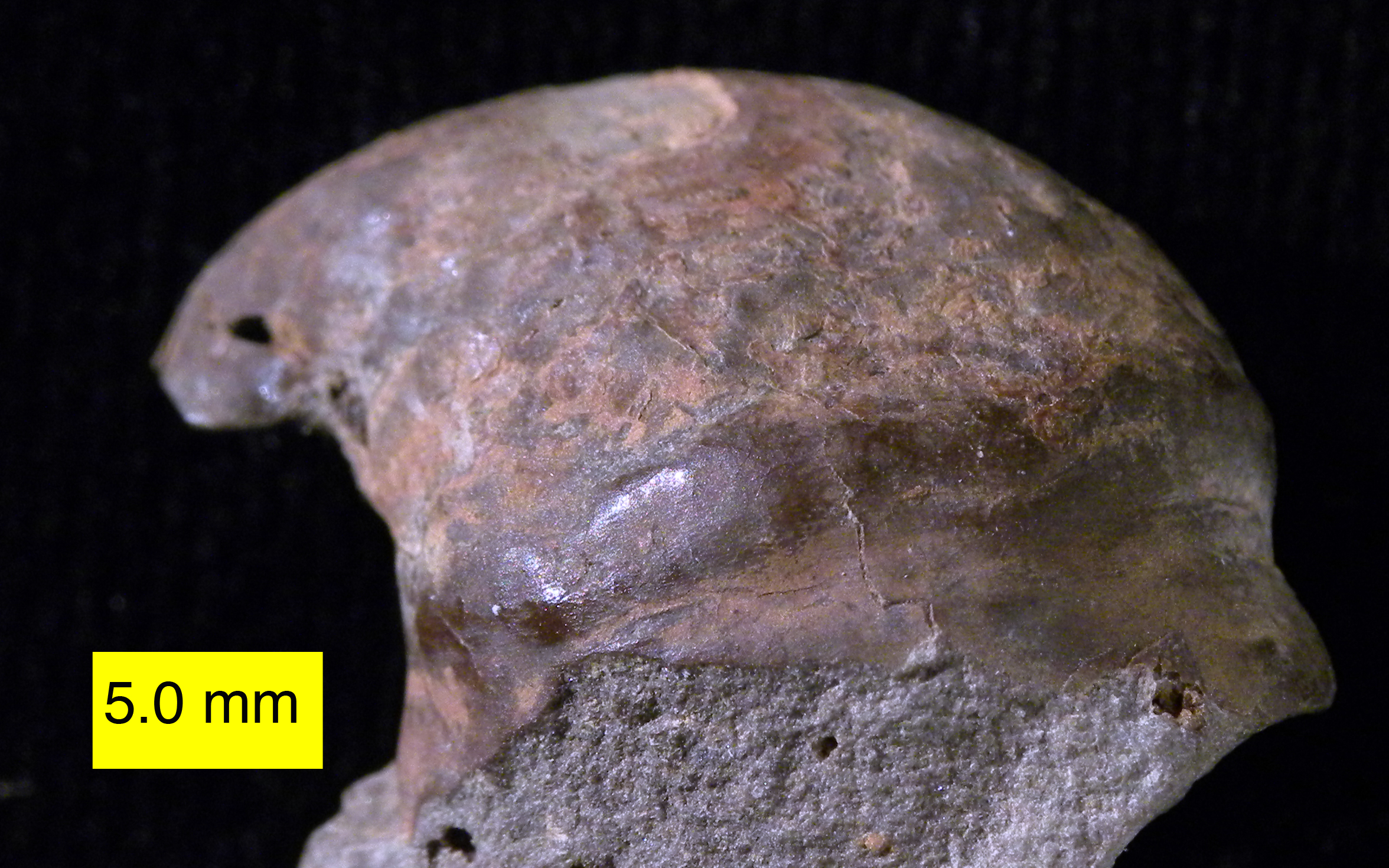
- Fossilized shell of the Silurian-Early Triassic sea snail Platyceras
  †Platyceras
  - †Platyceras marylandicum
  - †Platyceras niagarense
- †Platysiphon
- †Plectonotus
  - †Plectonotus boucoti
- †Plethobolbina
  - †Plethobolbina cornigera
  - †Plethobolbina typicalis
- †Pleurophorus
  - †Pleurophorus occidentalis
- †Pliendoceras
- †Polidevcia – type locality for genus
  - †Polidevcia bellistriata
- †Polytoechia – tentative report
- †Praenucula
  - †Praenucula lavata
- †Proterocameroceras
- †Prothyris
  - †Prothyris singewaldi – type locality for species
- †Protodouvillina
- †Psalikilus
- †Pseudoatrypa
- †Pseudorthoceras
  - †Pseudorthoceras knoxense
- †Pseudozygopleura
  - †Pseudozygopleura girtyi – or unidentified comparable form
- †Pterinea
  - †Pterinea demissa
  - †Pterinea flintstonensis
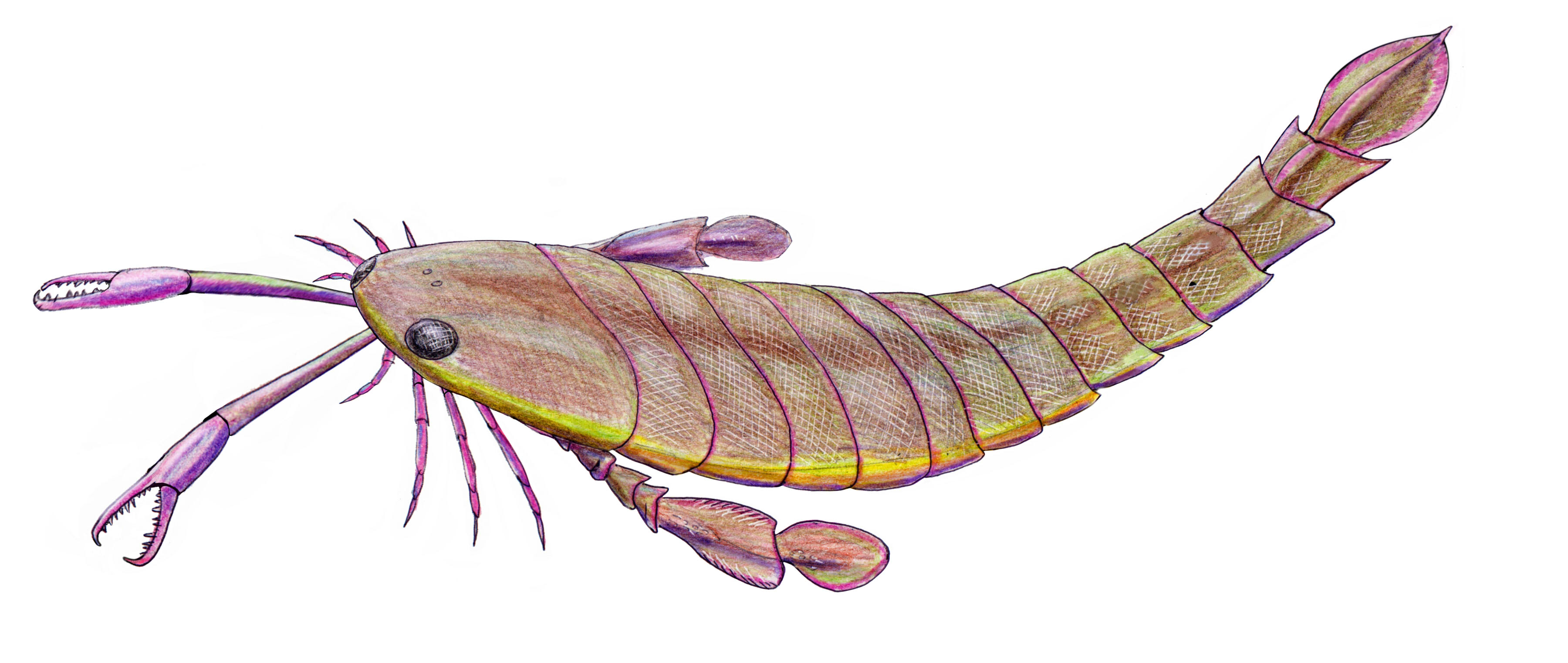
- Restoration of the Silurian-Middle Devonian eurypterid ("sea scorpion") Pterygotus
  †Pterygotus
  - †Pterygotus marylandicus
- †Punctatisporites
  - †Punctatisporites calamites
  - †Punctatisporites glaber
  - †Punctatisporites laevigatus
  - †Punctatisporites solidus

== R ==
- †Rafinesquina
  - †Rafinesquina alternata
  - †Rafinesquina corrugata
- †Resserella
  - †Resserella elegantula
- †Reticularia
  - †Reticularia bicostata
- †Retroclitendoceras
- †Retusotriletes
  - †Retusotriletes goensis
  - †Retusotriletes planus
  - †Retusotriletes punctatus
- †Rhabdosporites
  - †Rhabdosporites parvulus
- †Rhipidomella
- †Rhombopora – tentative report
  - †Rhombopora lepidendroides – or unidentified comparable form
- †Rhynchospirina
  - †Rhynchospirina globosa
- †Ribeiria
- †Rioceras
- †Ruedemannia – tentative report
  - †Ruedemannia lirata

== S ==
- †Samarisporites
  - †Samarisporites grossicorrugatus – type locality for species
  - †Samarisporites grossicorugatus
- †Sansabella
- †Schellwienella
  - †Schellwienella elegans
  - †Schellwienella rugosa
  - †Schellwienella tenuis
- †Schizodus
  - †Schizodus curtus
  - †Schizodus oherni
  - †Schizodus wheeleri
- †Schuchertella
- †Serpulopsis
  - †Serpulopsis insita
- †Shansiella
  - †Shansiella carbonaria – tentative report
- †Shellwienella
  - †Shellwienella elegans
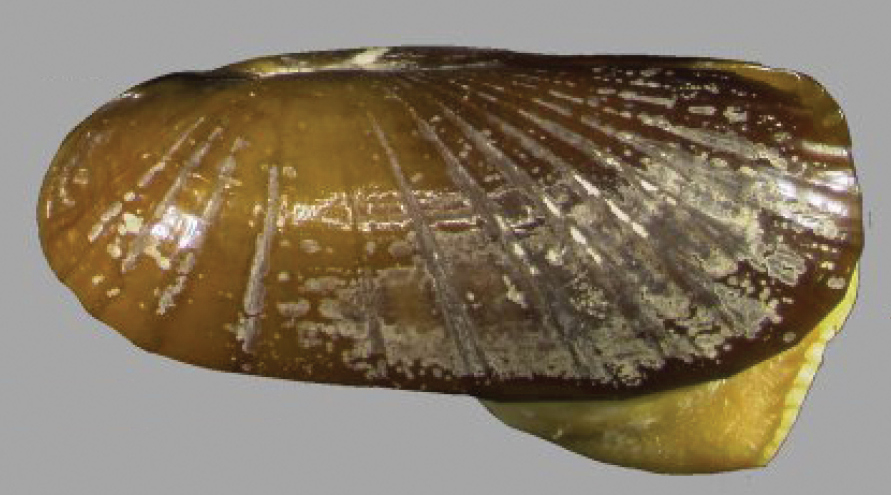
- Modern specimen of the marine bivalve Solemya
  Solemya
  - †Solemya radiata
  - †Solemya trapezoides
- †Soleniscus
  - †Soleniscus primigenius
- † Solenopsis
  - †Solenopsis solenoides
- †Sowerbyella
  - †Sowerbyella serica
  - †Sowerbyella sericea
- †Spaniodera – tentative report
  - †Spaniodera simplex – type locality for species
- †Spelaeotriletes
- †Spinozonotriletes
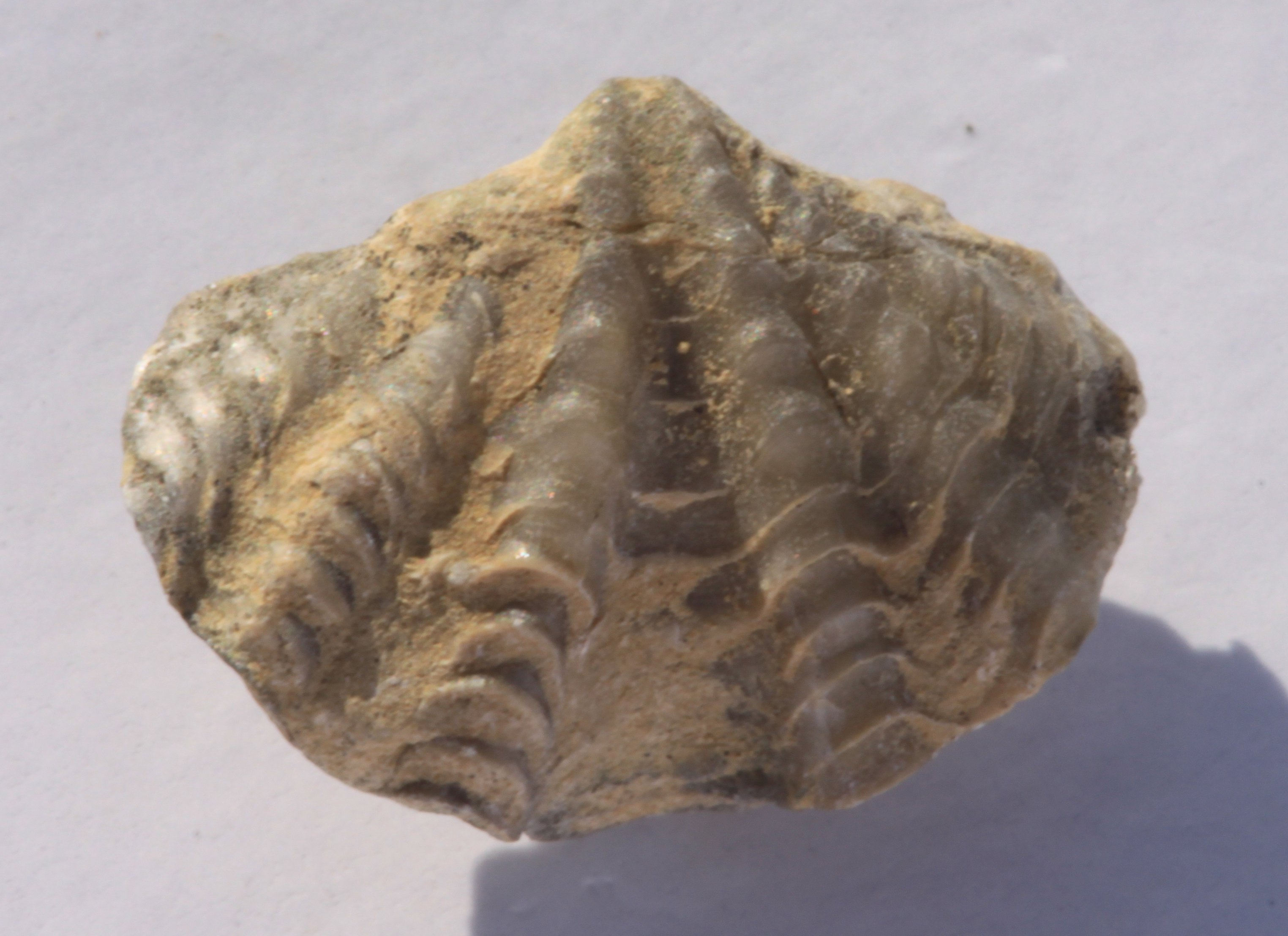
- Fossilized shell of the Late Ordovician-Late Triassic brachiopod Spirifer
  †Spirifer
  - †Spirifer disjunctus
  - †Spirifer vanuxemi
- †Stegerhynchus
  - †Stegerhynchus neglectum
- †Stenosiphon
- †Stereostylus
  - †Stereostylus profundus
- †Stichotrophia
- †Straparollus
  - †Straparollus marylandicus
- †Strobeus
  - †Strobeus paludinaeformis
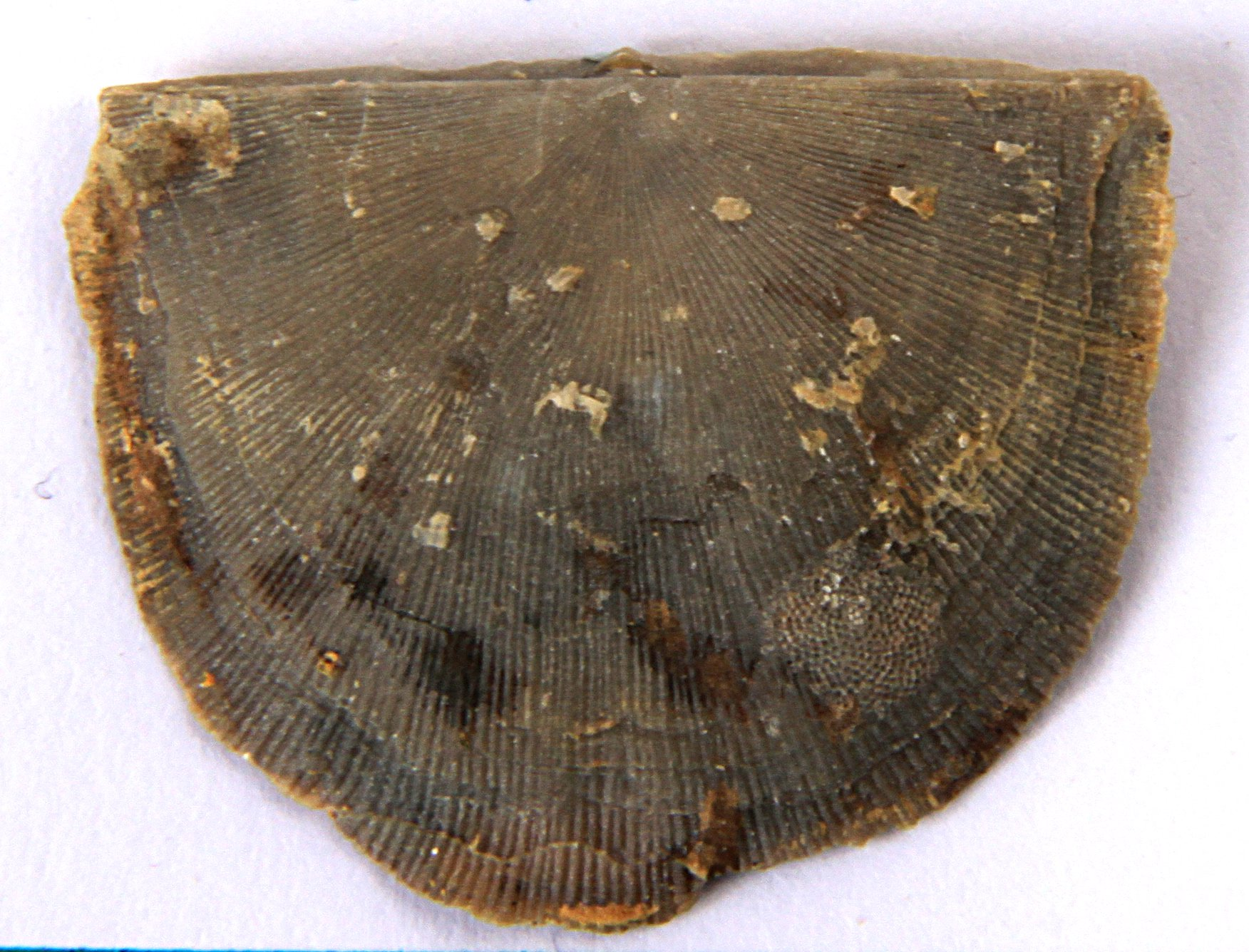
- Fossilized shell of the Ordovician-Silurian brachiopod Strophomena
  †Strophomena
- †Syntrophinella

== T ==
- †Tainoceras
  - †Tainoceras monolifer
- †Tancrediopsis
  - †Tancrediopsis cuneata
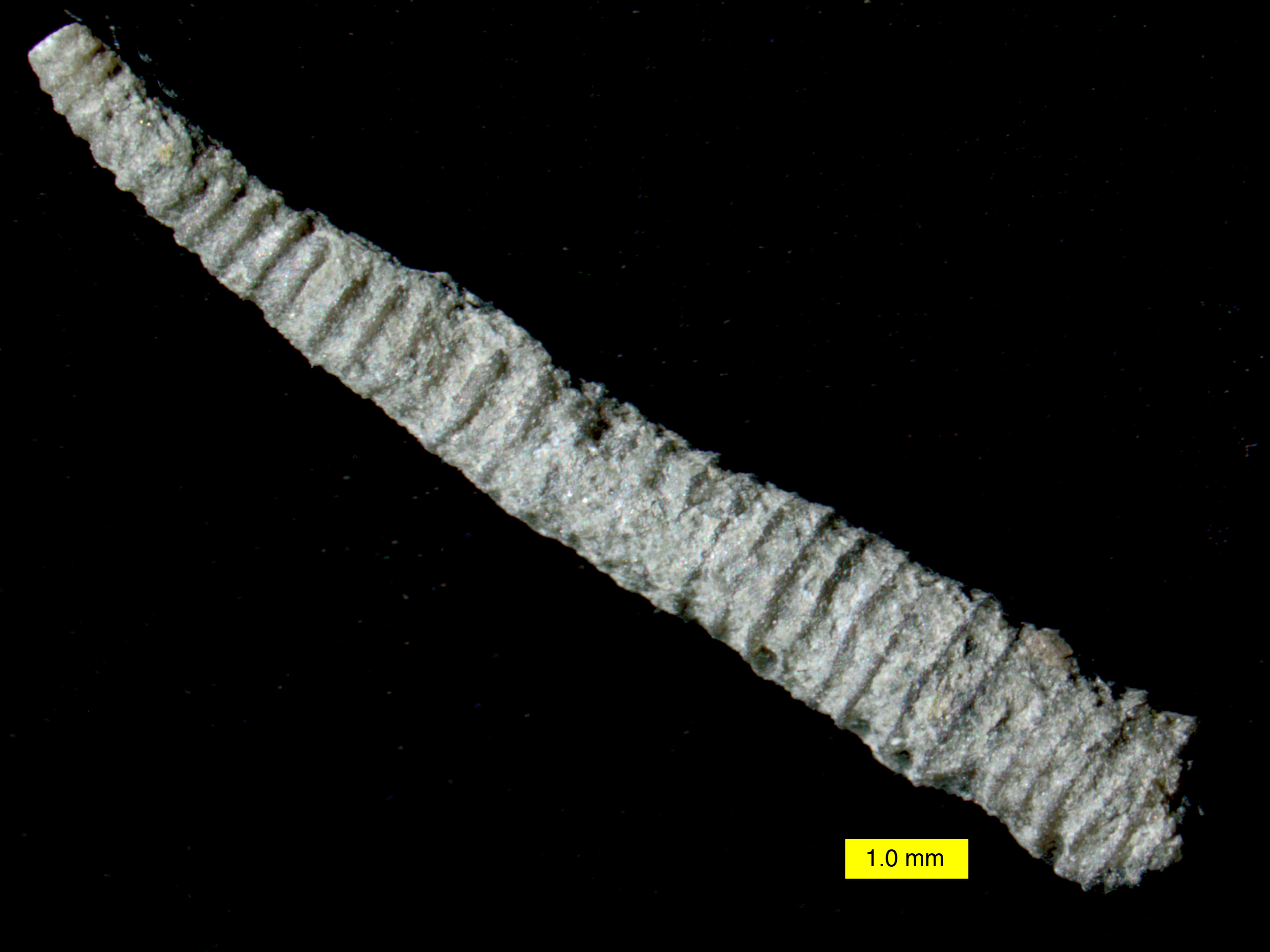
- Fossilized shell of the Early Ordovician-Late Devonian probable mollusc Tentaculites
  †Tentaculites
  - †Tentaculites gyracanthus
  - †Tentaculites minutus
  - †Tentaculites niagarense
  - †Tentaculites niagarensis
- †Tetralobula
- †Trigonocera
- †Trimerus
  - †Trimerus delphinocephalus
- †Tritoechia
- †Truncalosia
- †Turbonopsis
  - †Turbonopsis coronola – type locality for species

== U ==
- †Uncinulus
  - †Uncinulus marylandicus
  - †Uncinulus obtusiplicatus
  - †Uncinulus stricklandi

== V ==
- †Verrucosisporites
  - †Verrucosisporites rarituberculatus

== W ==
- †Waagenella
  - †Waagenella crassus
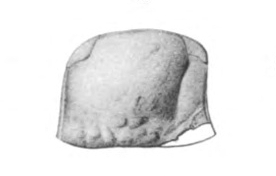
- Fossilized head of the Silurian eurypterid ("sea scorpion") Waeringopterus
  †Waeringopterus
  - †Waeringopterus cumberlandicus
- †Welleria
  - †Welleria obliqua
- †Whitfieldella
  - †Whitfieldella marylandica
- †Worthenia
  - †Worthenia castlemanensis – type locality for species

== X ==
- †Xenelasma

== Z ==
- †Zygobeyrichia
  - †Zygobeyrichia incipiens
  - †Zygobeyrichia tonolowayensis
  - †Zygobeyrichia ventricornis
  - †Zygobeyrichia ventripunctata
- †Zygosella
  - †Zygosella postica
- †Zygospira
  - †Zygospira modesta
