= Pleurophorus apicipennis =

Scientific classification
- Kingdom: Animalia
- Phylum: Arthropoda
- Clade: Pancrustacea
- Class: Insecta
- Order: Coleoptera
- Suborder: Polyphaga
- Infraorder: Scarabaeiformia
- Family: Scarabaeidae
- Genus: Pleurophorus
- Species: P. apicipennis

Binomial name
- Pleurophorus apicipennis Reitter, 1892

Species of beetle

Pleurophorus apicipennis is a species of beetle of the family Scarabaeidae. It is found in Afghanistan, China (Xinjiang), Iran, Kazakhstan, Kyrgyzstan, Pakistan, Tajikistan, Turkmenistan and Uzbekistan.

== Description ==
Adults reach a length of about 2.5–3 mm (0.098–0.118 in). They are very similar to Pleurophorus caesus. The main difference is the shape of the inter-strial space, which is thickened and raised toward the rear.
