= Pleurophorus opacus =

Scientific classification
- Kingdom: Animalia
- Phylum: Arthropoda
- Clade: Pancrustacea
- Class: Insecta
- Order: Coleoptera
- Suborder: Polyphaga
- Infraorder: Scarabaeiformia
- Family: Scarabaeidae
- Genus: Pleurophorus
- Species: P. opacus

Binomial name
- Pleurophorus opacus Reitter, 1892

Species of beetle

Pleurophorus opacus is a species of beetle of the family Scarabaeidae. It is found in Algeria, Libya, Morocco and Tunisia.

== Description ==
Adults reach a length of about 3.2 mm (0.13 in). They are very similar to Pleurophorus caesus, but the upper surface is only slightly shiny and the coloration is generally somewhat lighter and the elytra are often darker reddish-brown.
