= Aztecodus =

Aztecodus Temporal range: Middle Devonian

Scientific classification
- Kingdom: Animalia
- Phylum: Chordata
- Class: Chondrichthyes
- Order: Omalodontiformes
- Family: Aztecodontidae
- Genus: Aztecodus Long & Young, 1995

Extinct genus of Cartilaginous fish

Aztecodus is an extinct genus of Chondrichthyian from the Devonian period. It is named for middle to late Devonian-aged Aztec Siltstone of southern Victoria Land, Antarctica which produces this genus. It currently contains a singular species, A. harmsenae. It is named for sedimentologist Dr. Fraka Harmsen. It has unique teeth which are broad with widely divergent cusps separated by a crenulated cutting edge. Anareodus statei may be a junior synonym to this genus and species.
