= Pleurophorus tonkinensis =

Scientific classification
- Kingdom: Animalia
- Phylum: Arthropoda
- Clade: Pancrustacea
- Class: Insecta
- Order: Coleoptera
- Suborder: Polyphaga
- Infraorder: Scarabaeiformia
- Family: Scarabaeidae
- Genus: Pleurophorus
- Species: P. tonkinensis

Binomial name
- Pleurophorus tonkinensis Balthasar, 1933

Species of beetle

Pleurophorus tonkinensis is a species of beetle of the family Scarabaeidae. It is found in Vietnam and Taiwan.

== Description ==
Adults reach a length of about 2–2.8 mm (0.079–0.110 in). They have a nearly parallel-sided, glossy, blackish-brown body, with the anterior margin of the head and legs light reddish-brown.
