= Pleurophorus cracens =

Scientific classification
- Kingdom: Animalia
- Phylum: Arthropoda
- Clade: Pancrustacea
- Class: Insecta
- Order: Coleoptera
- Suborder: Polyphaga
- Infraorder: Scarabaeiformia
- Family: Scarabaeidae
- Genus: Pleurophorus
- Species: P. cracens

Binomial name
- Pleurophorus cracens Motschulsky, 1863

Species of beetle

Pleurophorus cracens is a species of beetle of the family Scarabaeidae. It is found in Sri Lanka.

== Description ==
Adults reach a length of about 2 mm (0.079 in). They have an elongate, not very shiny, blackish-brown body, with the frontal margin of the head, the sides of the elytra and the legs lighter.
