= Pleurophorus impressicollis =

Scientific classification
- Kingdom: Animalia
- Phylum: Arthropoda
- Clade: Pancrustacea
- Class: Insecta
- Order: Coleoptera
- Suborder: Polyphaga
- Infraorder: Scarabaeiformia
- Family: Scarabaeidae
- Genus: Pleurophorus
- Species: P. impressicollis

Binomial name
- Pleurophorus impressicollis (Boheman, 1858)

Synonyms
- Psammodius impressicollis Boheman, 1858

Species of beetle

Pleurophorus impressicollis is a species of beetle of the family Scarabaeidae. It is found in Indonesia (Java, Sumatra, Kalimantan), Malaysia and Vietnam.

== Description ==
Adults reach a length of about 2.4–2.8 mm (0.094–0.110 in). They have a shiny, blackish-brown body, with the anterior margin of the head and legs lighter.
