= Cobandrahlepis =

Cobandrahlepis Temporal range: Middle Devonian, Givetian

Scientific classification
- Kingdom: Animalia
- Phylum: Chordata
- Class: †Placodermi
- Order: †Arthrodira
- Family: †Phyllolepididae
- Genus: †Cobandrahlepis; Ritchie, 2005
- Species: †C. petyrwardi

Binomial name
- †Cobandrahlepis petyrwardi Ritchie, 2005

Extinct genus of fishes

Cobandrahlepis is an extinct genus of phyllolepid placoderm found in New South Wales, Australia.
