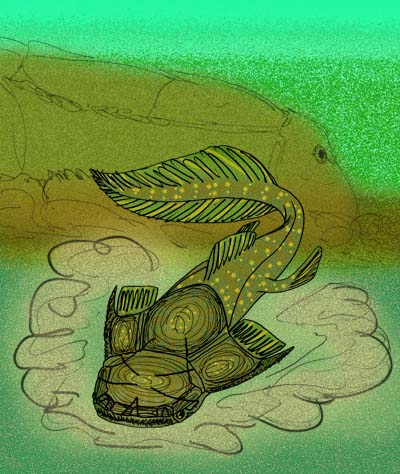
- Austrophyllolepis ritchiei and Bothriolepis mawsoni

Scientific classification
- Kingdom: Animalia
- Phylum: Chordata
- Class: †Placodermi
- Order: †Arthrodira
- Suborder: †Phyllolepida
- Family: †Phyllolepididae; Woodward 1891

Type species
- Phyllolepis concentrica Agassiz 1844

Genera
- Phyllolepis Agassiz, 1844; Austrophyllolepis Long, 1984; Placolepis Ritchie, 1984; Yurammia Young, 2005; Cowralepis Ritchie, 2005; Cobandrahlepis Ritchie, 2005

= Phyllolepididae =

Phyllolepididae Temporal range: Devonian

Family of flattened placoderms

Phyllolepididae is one of two families of phyllolepid placoderms. The family, as a whole, is believed to be descended from the Chinese placoderm, Gavinaspis (which forms the other, monotypic family, "Gavinaspididae"). All but two genera are, more or less, restricted to freshwater habitats of the Early to Middle Devonian of Australia. By the Frasnian, the genus Placolepis would spread throughout the world, with fossils being found in Australia, Turkey, Venezuela, and Antarctica, and by the start of the Famennian, phyllolepids would become extinct in Australia (then eastern Gondwana), with only species of Phyllolepis surviving in freshwater environments of Europe and North America.

With the exception of Yurammia. all phyllolepids have distinct ornamentation consisting primarily of concentric rings.

== Genera ==
=== Phyllolepis ===
The type genus is restricted to freshwater Famennian strata of Europe and North America. It is also the youngest genus of phyllolepid, being the only taxon that survived the Frasnian-Famennian extinction event. Most species are known only from isolated or fragmented plates. Gill arches seen in whole fossils of the recently described P. thomsoni, together with the castanets-shaped mouths typical of the family, confirm that phyllolepids were suctorial predators analogous to goosefish or flatheads.

=== Placolepis ===
This Frasnian genus is the most widespread phyllolepid, with fossils found in Australia, Turkey, Venezuela and Antarctica.
