= Maya Mountain =

Mountain in Antarctica

Maya Mountain (77°47′S 160°36′E) is a small pyramidal mountain, about 2,000 metres (6,600 ft) high, between Aztec Mountain and Pyramid Mountain, just south of Taylor Glacier in Victoria Land, Antarctica. It was so named by the New Zealand Geological Survey Antarctic Expedition (1958–59) because its shape resembles the pyramidal ceremonial platforms used by the Maya civilization.

== Geology ==
The slopes of Maya Mountain expose a sequence of sedimentary strata of the Beacon Supergroup. The Weller Coal Measures form its summit. It is underlain by the Metschel Tillite and the Aztec Siltstone with the Beacon Heights Quartzite at the mountain's base. The Maya Mountain is the type locality of the Maya erosion surface. It is a regionally significant unconformity that separates the Permian glacial strata of Metschel Tillite of the Victoria Group from the underlying Devonian redbeds of the Aztec Siltstone of the Taylor Group within the Beacon Supergroup. This erosion surface is a regionally extensive glacially eroded unconformity that represents a period of non-deposition and/or erosion lasting for about 86 to 109 million years. The Maya Erosion Surface is overlain by locally preserved remnants of the Metschel Tillite. Over large areas, the Metschel Tillite and Maya Erosion Surface have been removed later erosion that created the younger Pyramid Erosion Surface. In nearby Aztec Mountain, the Maya erosion surface exhibits smoothly rounded and northwest-to-southeast aligned grooves and ridges that are argued to be the result of glacial erosion.

== See also ==
- Altar Mountain
