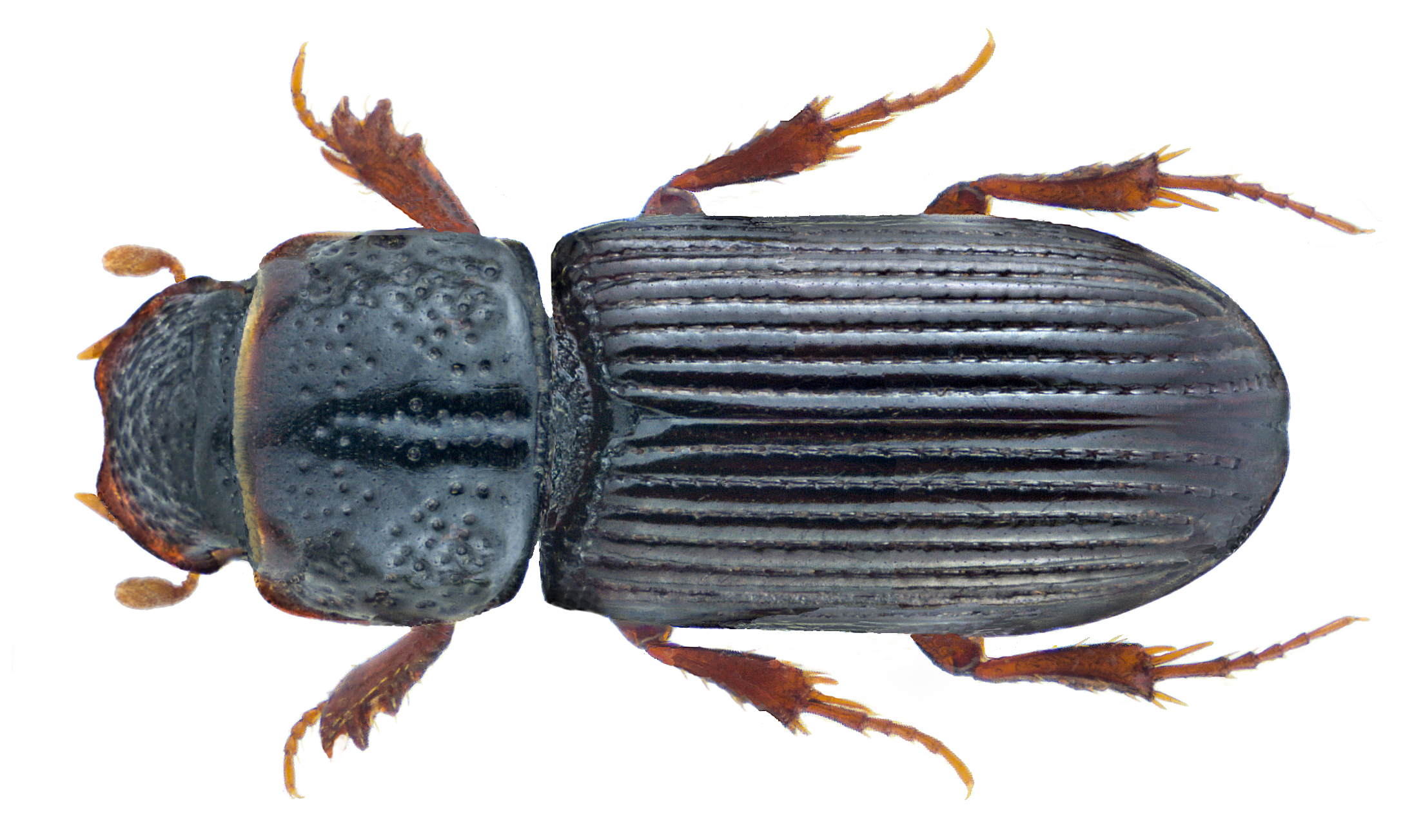
- Pleurophorus caesus

Scientific classification
- Kingdom: Animalia
- Phylum: Arthropoda
- Clade: Pancrustacea
- Class: Insecta
- Order: Coleoptera
- Suborder: Polyphaga
- Infraorder: Scarabaeiformia
- Family: Scarabaeidae
- Tribe: Psammodiini
- Genus: Pleurophorus; Mulsant, 1842

= Pleurophorus =

Genus of beetles

Pleurophorus is a genus of aphodiine dung beetles in the family Scarabaeidae. There are more than 30 described species in Pleurophorus.

== Species ==
These 37 species belong to the genus Pleurophorus:

- Pleurophorus africanus Pittino, 1984
- Pleurophorus akamasicus Pittino & Miessen, 2007
- Pleurophorus anatolicus Petrovitz, 1961
- Pleurophorus apicipennis Reitter, 1892
- Pleurophorus arabicus Pittino & Mariani, 1986
- Pleurophorus banksi Pittino & Mariani, 1986
- Pleurophorus beccarii Pittino & Mariani, 1986
- Pleurophorus bengalensis Pittino & Mariani, 1986
- Pleurophorus besucheti Pittino & Mariani, 1986
- Pleurophorus caesus (Panzer, 1796)
- Pleurophorus cambeforti Pittino & Mariani, 1986
- Pleurophorus capicola Péringuey, 1901
- Pleurophorus cracens Motschulsky, 1863
- Pleurophorus dinajpurensis Pittino & Mariani, 1986
- Pleurophorus dubius C.Wanner
- Pleurophorus edithae Endrödi, 1973
- Pleurophorus elongatus Moore, 1861
- Pleurophorus formosanus Pittino & Mariani, 1986
- Pleurophorus impressicollis (Boheman, 1858)
- Pleurophorus laticollis Pittino & Mariani, 1986
- Pleurophorus ledouxi Pittino & Mariani, 1986
- Pleurophorus madagassus Pittino & Mariani, 1986
- Pleurophorus maghrebinicus Pittino & Mariani, 1986
- Pleurophorus mediterranicus Pittino & Mariani, 1986
- Pleurophorus micros (Bates, 1887)
- Pleurophorus natalensis
- Pleurophorus nepalensis Pittino & Mariani, 1986
- Pleurophorus opacus Reitter, 1892
- Pleurophorus pannonicus Petrovitz, 1961
- Pleurophorus parvulus (Chevrolat, 1864)
- Pleurophorus raffrayi Pittino & Mariani, 1986
- Pleurophorus schereri Pittino & Mariani, 1986
- Pleurophorus setosus Pittino & Mariani, 1986
- Pleurophorus thailandicus Pittino & Mariani, 1986
- Pleurophorus tonkinensis Balthasar, 1933
- Pleurophorus torretassoi Schatzmayer, 1930
- Pleurophorus villiersi Bordat, 1984
