= Aztec Mountain =

Mountain in Ross Dependency, Antarctica

Coordinates: 77°48′S 160°31′E

Aztec Mountain is a small pyramidal mountain over 2,000 metres (6,600 ft) high, just southwest of Maya Mountain and west of Beacon Valley in Victoria Land. It was so named by the New Zealand Geological Survey Antarctic Expedition (1958–59) because its shape resembles the pyramidal ceremonial platforms used by the Aztec and Maya civilizations.

== Geology ==
As shown in McPherson's 1975 Figure 2.1, approximately 85-metre (279 ft) of sedimentary strata of the Beacon Supergroup are exposed on the eastern flank of Aztec Mountain. Its summit consists of the Weller Coal Measures. These coal measures is underlain by the Metschel Tillite, which overlies the Aztec Siltstone. The Aztec Siltstone overlies the Beacon Heights Orthoguartzite, which forms the base of Mount Aztec.

The Permian Weller Coal Measures consists largely of fine to medium-grained, graded sandstone beds interstratified with laminated siltstone and carbonaceous mudstone. The sandstone consists mainly of sheet-like, graded beds. these beds are 0.01–0.6-metre (0.033–1.969 ft) thick and internally horizontally laminated to crosslaminated. The horizontally laminated beds exhibit primary current lineations. Unique to Aztec Mountain is a 5-metre (16 ft) thick medium-grained sandstone. It contains 1–5-metre (3.3–16.4 ft) thick sigmoid shaped cross-beds that form well-developed topset, foreset, and bottomset beds. These cross-beds, which are interpreted to be the foresets of a Gilbert delta, grade downward into and interfinger with very fine-grained beds of lacustrine sandstones, siltstones and mudstones.

The Permian Metschel Tillite unconformably underlies the Weller Coal Measures, separated by the Pyramid erosion surface, and uncomfortably overlies the Aztec Siltstone, separated by the Maya erosion surface. It consists of glacial diamictites containing striated clasts.

The Devonian Aztec Siltstone underlies Metschel Tillite at Aztec Mountain. The Maya erosion surface, a significant regional unconformity, separates it from the overlying Metschel Tillite. Aztec Mountain is the type locality of the Aztec Siltstone. At its type locality, the Aztec Siltstone consists of 56-metre (184 ft) of coarse-grained, quartzose, braided river and stream and Gilbert delta deposited sandstone. They directly overlie and grade into red and green silty lacustrine deposits. The lacustrine deposits conformably overlie the Beacon Heights Orthoguartzite. The Aztec Siltstone contains unstratified paleosols with vertical veins networks and calcareous nodules, which are called glaebules by soil scientists.

== Fossils ==
Fragmented stems of plants occur within the siltstones and mudstones of the Weller Coal Measures exposed at Aztec Mountain.

Helby and McEIroy exstracted an important palynomorph microflora from the Aztec Siltstone at Aztec Mountain. This assemblage is dominated by Geminospora lemurata, which is similar to palynomrophs of Frasnian age from Western Australia. These palynomorphs from Aztec Mountain provide a rare and important biostratigraphic datum for correlation of the Aztec Siltstone with strata in Australia and paleoenvironmental reconstruction.

== See also ==
- Altar Mountain
- Maya Mountain
