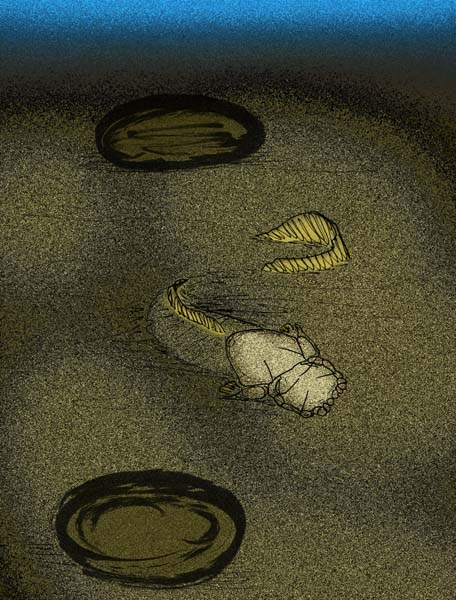
- Restoration of Y. browni

Scientific classification
- Kingdom: Animalia
- Phylum: Chordata
- Class: †Placodermi
- Order: †Arthrodira
- Family: †Phyllolepididae
- Genus: †Yurammia; Young, 2005

Type species
- Yurammia browni Young, 2005

= Yurammia =

Yurammia Temporal range: Late Devonian

Extinct genus of fishes

Yurammia is a placoderm from what is now the Pambula River in New South Wales. Unlike all other known phyllolepids, Yurammia's plates had no external grooves.
