= Ancyrospora =

Ancyrospora Temporal range: 435–228 Ma

Scientific classification
- Kingdom: Plantae
- Division: incertae sedis
- Genus: †Ancyrospora; Richardson, 1960

Genus of fossil plants

Ancyrospora is a fossil plant genus.

The genus was described in 1960 by J.B. Richardson.
