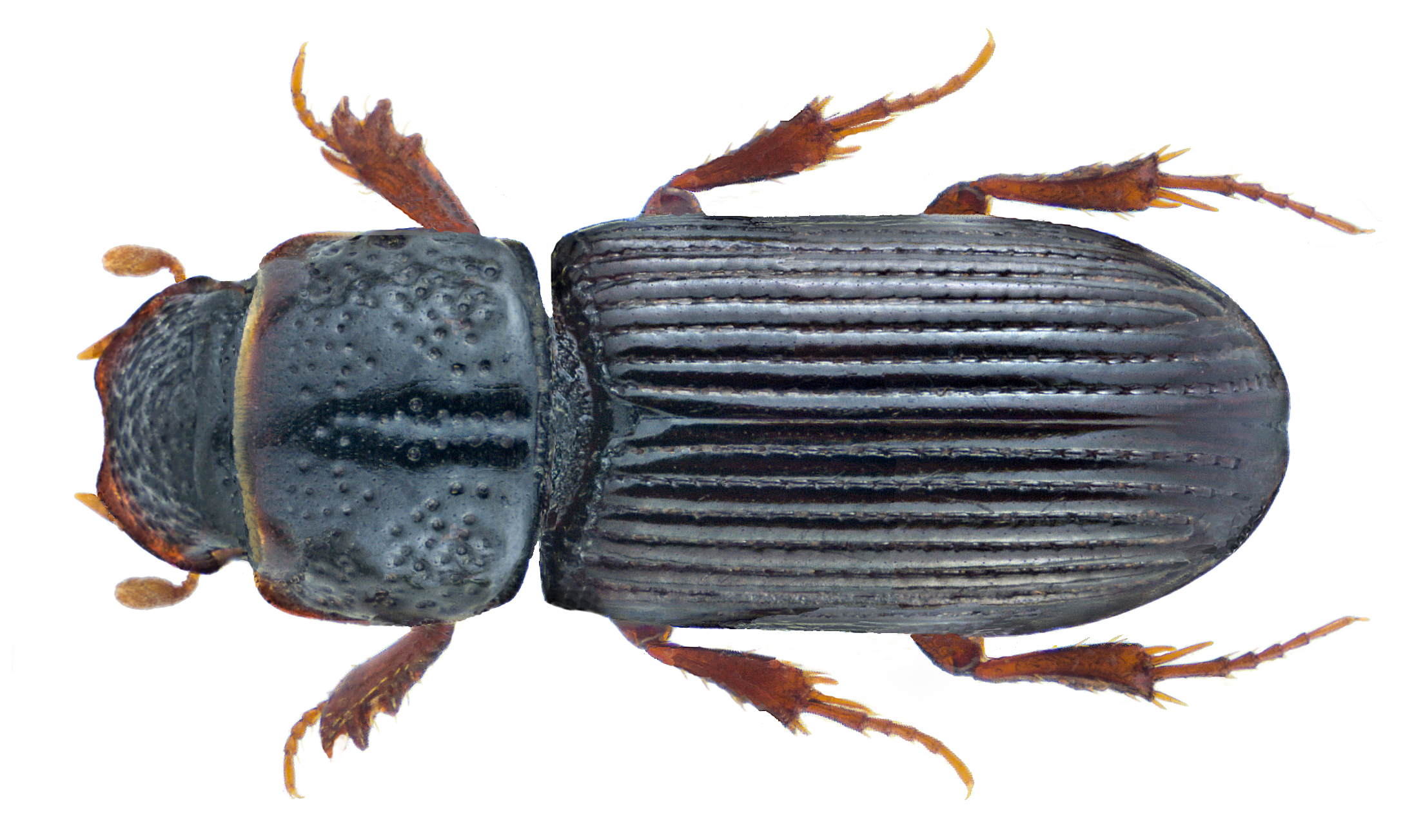

Scientific classification
- Kingdom: Animalia
- Phylum: Arthropoda
- Clade: Pancrustacea
- Class: Insecta
- Order: Coleoptera
- Suborder: Polyphaga
- Infraorder: Scarabaeiformia
- Family: Scarabaeidae
- Genus: Pleurophorus
- Species: P. caesus

Binomial name
- Pleurophorus caesus (Panzer, 1796)

Synonyms
- Scarabaeus caesus Panzer, 1796; Ataenius rugiceps Dury, 1902; Aphodius angustus Philippi & Philippi, 1864; Pleurophorus caesus elongatulus Mulsant, 1842

= Pleurophorus caesus =

Species of beetle

Pleurophorus caesus is a species of aphodiine dung beetle in the family Scarabaeidae. It is found in Europe and Northern Asia (excluding China), Central America, North America, and South America.

== Description ==
Adults reach a length of about 2.6–3.2 mm (0.10–0.13 in). They have an elongate, nearly parallel-sided, glossy, blackish-brown body, with the anterior margin of the head and the legs lighter reddish-brown.

== Distribution ==
Afrotropical: Equatorial Guinea, South Africa, Somalia, Sudan. Palaearctic: Albania, Algeria, Austria, Azores, Azerbaijan, Belarus, Belgium, Bosnia Herzegovina, Bulgaria, the Canary Islands, Croatia, the Czech Republic, Egypt, France, Georgia, Germany, Great Britain, Greece, Hungary, Iran, Israel, Italy, Japan, Kazakhstan, Luxembourg, Macedonia, Madeira, Malta, Morocco, the Netherlands, Poland, Romania, Russia, Serbia, Slovakia, Slovenia, Spain, Sweden, Switzerland, Tunisia, Turkey, Ukraine, Uzbekistan. Nearctic: United States (Colorado, Indiana, Maryland, New Mexico, South Dakota, Texas, Wisconsin), Canada (British Columbia, Ontario, Quebec). Neotropical: Chile. Madagascan: Madagascar.
