= List of placoderm genera =

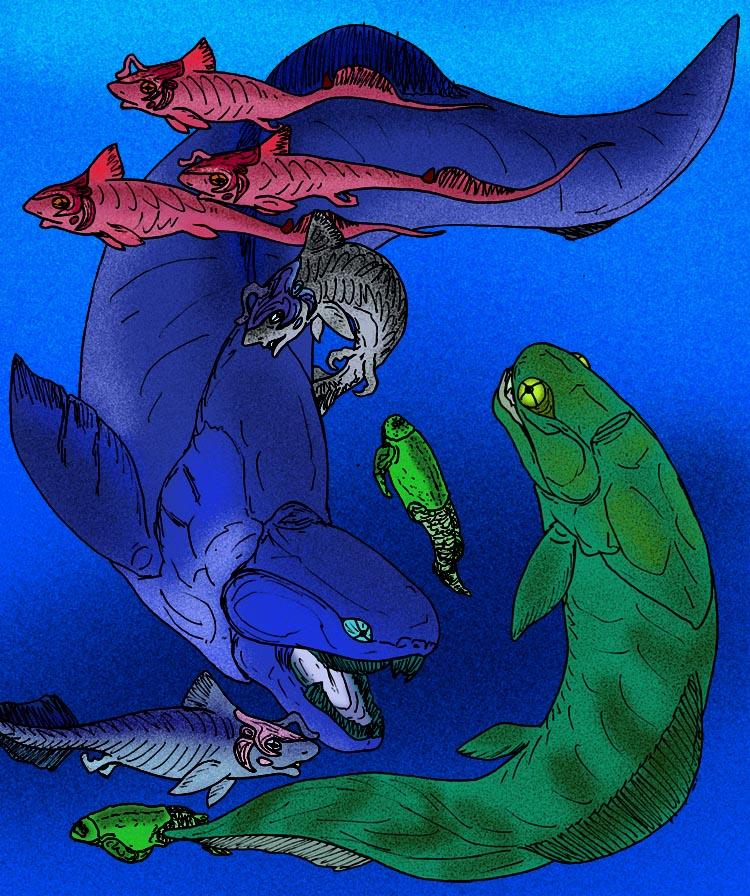
Various placoderm species, including the famous Dunkleosteus

This list of placoderms is an attempt to create a comprehensive listing of all genera from the fossil record that have ever been considered to be members of the class Placodermi. This list excludes purely vernacular terms. It includes all commonly accepted genera, but also genera that are now considered invalid, doubtful (nomina dubia), or were not formally published (nomina nuda), as well as junior synonyms of more established names, and genera that are no longer considered placoderms. The modern descendants of placoderms, the bony and cartilaginous fishes, and their extinct descendants, the Acanthodii (without cartilaginous fishes), are not included here.

This list includes 334 generic names.

== Naming conventions and terminology ==
Naming conventions and terminology follow the International Code of Zoological Nomenclature. Technical terms used include:

- Junior synonym: A name which describes the same taxon as a previously published name. If two or more genera are formally designated and the type specimens are later assigned to the same genus, the first to be published (in chronological order) is the senior synonym, and all other instances are junior synonyms. Senior synonyms are generally used, except by special decision of the ICZN, but junior synonyms cannot be used again, even if deprecated. Junior synonymy is often subjective, unless the genera described were both based on the same type specimen.
- Nomen nudum (Latin for "naked name"): A name that has appeared in print but has not yet been formally published by the standards of the ICZN. Nomina nuda (the plural form) are invalid, and are therefore not italicized as a proper generic name would be. If the name is later formally published, that name is no longer a nomen nudum and will be italicized on this list. Often, the formally published name will differ from any nomina nuda that describe the same specimen.
- Nomen oblitum (Latin for "forgotten name"): A name that has not been used in the scientific community for more than fifty years after its original proposal.
- Preoccupied name: A name that is formally published, but which has already been used for another taxon. This second use is invalid (as are all subsequent uses) and the name must be replaced. As preoccupied names are not valid generic names, they will also go unitalicized on this list.
- Nomen dubium (Latin for "dubious name"): A name describing a fossil with no unique diagnostic features. As this can be an extremely subjective and controversial designation, this term is not used on this list.

== List of genera ==
Genus	Authors	Year	Status	Age	Location	Notes
Acanthaspis	Newberry	1875	Valid			Preoccupied by hemiptera genus Acanthaspis Amyot & Serville, 1843, valid species synonymized with Kujdanowiaspis
Acantholepis	Krøyer	1846	Valid.			
Acantholepis	Newberry	1875	Preocc.			Preoccupied by Acantholepis Krøyer, 1846
Actinolepis	Agassiz	1845	Valid.			
Aethaspis	Denison	1958	Valid.			
Africanaspis	Long; Anderson; Gess; Hiller	1997	Valid.			
Aggeraspis	Gross	1962	Valid.			
Ailuracantha	White	1969	Valid.			
Aleosteus	Johnson; Elliott; Wittke	2000	Valid.			
Anarthraspis	Bryant	1934	Valid.			
Angarichthys	Obruchev	1927	Valid.			
Antarctaspis	White	1968	Valid.			
Antarctolepis	White	1968	Valid.			
Antineosteus	Lelièvre	1984	Valid.			
Arctaspis	Heintz	1929	Valid.			
Arctolepis	Eastman	1908	Valid.			
Arctonema	Orvig	1969	Valid.			
Arenipiscis	Young	1981	Valid.			
Asiacanthus	Liu	1948	Valid.			Placodermi incertae sedis
Aspidichthys	Newberry	1873	Valid.			Arthrodire incertae sedis
Asterolepis	Eichwald	1840	Valid.			
Asterosteus	Newberry	1875	Valid.			
Atlantidosteus	Lelièvre	1984	Valid.			
Austrophyllolepis	Long	1984	Valid.			
Austroptyctodus	Long	1997	Valid.			
Baringaspis	Miles	1973	Valid.			
Batteraspis	Pageau	1969	Valid.			
Belemnacanthus	Eastman	1898	Valid.			
Belgiosteus	Lehman	1973	Valid.			
Belosteus	Jaekel	1927	Valid.			
Bimbianga	Young	2005	Valid.			
Bolivosteus	Goujet; Janvier; Suarez-Riglos	1985	Valid.			
Bollandaspis	Schultze	1976	Valid.			
Boomeraspis	Long	1995	Valid.			
Bothriolepis	Eichwald	1840	Valid.			
Brachydeirus	Koenen	1880	Valid.			
Brachygnathus	Agassiz	1844	Valid.			
Brachygnathus	Hussakof	1909	Preocc.			Preoccupied by placoderm genus Brachygnathus Agassiz, 1844
Brachyosteus	Jaekel	1927	Valid.			
Braunosteus	Stensiö	1959	Valid.			
Breizosteus	Goujet	1980	Valid.			
Brindabellaspis	Young	1980	Valid.			
Brontichthys	Claypole	1894	Invalid.			Junior synonym of Titanichthys
Bruntonichthys	Dennis; Miles	1980	Valid.			
Bryantaspis	White; Moy-Thomas	1940	Valid.			Replacement name for Cryptaspis Bryant, 1934
Bryantolepis	Denison	1958	Valid.			
Buchanosteus	Stensiö	1945	Valid.			
Bullerichthys	Dennis; Miles	1980	Valid.			
Bungartius	Dunkle	1947	Valid.			
Burrinjucosteus			Valid.			
Callognathus	Newberry	1890	Valid.			
Campbellodus	Miles; Young	1977	Valid.			
Camuropiscis	Dennis; Miles	1979	Valid.			
Carolowilhelmina	Mark-Kurik; Carls	2002	Valid.			
Cartieraspis	Pageau	1969	Valid.			
Cathlesichthys	Young	2004	Valid.			
Ceraspis	Schultze	1887	Preocc.			Preoccupied by coleoptere genus Ceraspis Lepeletier & Serville, 1825
Ceratolepichthys	Whitley	1940	Valid.			Replacement name for Ceratolepis Gross, 1933
Ceratolepis	Gross	1933	Preocc.			Preoccupied by coleoptere genus Ceratolepis Chapuis, 1873
Changyonophyton			Valid.			
Cheliophorus			Lapsus calami.			Misspelling of Chelyophorus
Chelyophorus	Agassiz	1844	Valid.			
Chuchinolepis	Chang	1978	Valid.			
Clarkeosteus	Obruchev	1964	Valid.			
Cobandrahlepis	Young	2005	Valid.			
Coccosteus	Miller	1841	Valid.			
Coelosteichthys	Whitley	1940	Valid.			Replacement name for Coelosteus Gross, 1930
Coelosteus	Gross	1930	Preocc.			Preoccupied by fish genus Coelosteus Newberry, 1887
Compagopiscis	Gardiner & Miles	1994	Valid.			
Companognathus			Valid.			
Cosmacanthus	Agassiz	1845	Valid.			
Cryptaspidisca	Strand	1942	Syn.			Replacement name for Cryptaspis Bryant, 1934
Cryptaspis	Bryant	1934	Preocc.			Preoccupied by coleoptere genus Cryptaspis Pascoe, 1842
Ctenurella	Orvig	1960	Valid.			
Cyrtosteus	Gross	1932	Valid.			
Deinodus	Hussakof; Bryant	1919	Valid.			
Deirosteus	Wells	1942	Valid.			
Denisonodus	Johnson; Elliott	1996	Valid.			
Desmoporella	Orvig	1971	Valid.			
Destnoporella			Valid.			
Deveonema	Kulczycki	1957	Valid.			
Dhanguura	Young	2004	Valid.			
Diandongpetalichthys	Pan; Wang	1978	Valid.			
Diadsomaspis	Gross	1937	Valid.			
Dicksonosteus	Goujet	1975	Valid.			
Dinichthys	Newberry	1873	Originally regarded as a synonym for Dunkleosteus, now according to Carr and Hlavin 2010, it is a distinct genus.			
Dinomylostoma	Eastman	1906	Valid.			
Diplognathus	Newberry	1878	Valid.			
Dobrowlania	Stensiö	1944	Valid.			
Dunkleosteus	Lehman	1956	Valid.			
Eastmanosteus	Obruchev	1964	Valid.			
Eczematolepis	Miller	1892	Valid.			Replacement name for Acantholepis Newberry, 1875
Eldenosteus	Miles	1964	Valid.			
Elegantaspis	Heintz	1929	Valid.			
Ellopetalichthys	Ørvig	1957	Valid.			
Enseosteus	Jaekel	1919	Valid.			
Entelognathus	Zhu et al	2013	Valid.			Placodermi incertae sedis
Epipetalichthys	Stensiö	1925	Valid.			
Erikaspis	Dupret; Goujet; Mark-Kurik	2007	Valid.			
Errolosteus	Young	1981	Valid.			
Erromenosteus	Jaekel	1919	Valid.			
Eskimaspis	Dineley; Liu Yuhai	1984	Valid.			
Euleptaspis	White; Moy-Thomas	1940	Valid.			
Euptychaspis	White; Moy-Thomas	1941	Preocc.			Replacement name for Ptychaspis Bryant, 1935. Preoccupied by trilobite genus Euptychaspis Ulrich, 1931
Euryaspidichthys	Whitley	1950	Valid.			Replacement name for Euryaspis Bryant, 1932
Euraspis	Liu	1991	Valid.			
Euryaspis	Bryant	1932	Preocc.			Preoccupied by coleoptere genus Euryaspis Blanchard, 1851
Eurycaraspis	Li	1991	Valid.			
Fallacosteus	Long	1990	Valid.			
Gaspeaspis	Pageau	1969	Valid.			
Gavinaspis	Dupret; Zhu	2008	Valid.			
Gemuendenaspis	Miles	1962	Valid.			
Gemuendina	Traquair	1903	Valid.			
Glyptaspis	Newberry	1890	Valid.			
Golshanichthys	Lelièvre; Janvier; Goujet	1981	Valid.			
Goniosteus	Gross	1933	Valid.			
Goodradigbeeon	White	1978	Valid.			
Gorgonichthys	Claypole	1892	Valid.			
Grazosteus	Gross	1958	Valid.			Arthrodire incertae sedis, known only from a medial dorsal plate with a pair of prominent, posterior-pointing prongs.
Groenlandaspis	Heintz	1932	Valid.			
Grossaspis	White; Moy-Thomas	1940	Valid.			Replacement name for Ceraspis Schlueter, 1887
Grossilepis	Stensiö	1949	Valid.			
Grossosteus	White; Moy-Thomas	1940	Valid.			Replacement name for Coelosteus Gross, 1930
Gymnotrachelus	Dunkle; Bungart	1939	Valid.			
Gyracanthus	Agassiz	1835	Valid.			
Gyroplacosteus	Obruschev	1930	Valid.			
Hadrosteus	Gross	1932	Valid.			
Harrytoombsia	Miles; Dennis	1979	Valid.			
Heintzaspis	Strand	1932	Valid.			Replacement name for Acanthapsis Newberry, 1975
Heintzichthys	Whitley	1933	Valid.			Replacement name for Stenognathus Newberry, 1898
Heightingtonaspis	White	1969	Valid.			
Heintzosteus	Goujet	1984	Valid.			
Heterogaspis	Strand	1932	Valid.			
Heterosteus	Asmuss	1856	Valid.			
Heteroyunnanolepis	Wang	1944	Valid.			
Holdenius	Dunkle; Bungart	1942	Valid.			
Hollardosteus	Lehman	1956	Valid.			
Holonema	Newberry	1890	Valid.			
Homosteus	Asmuss	1856	Valid.			
Huginaspis	Heintz	1929	Valid.			
Hussakofia	Cossmann	1910	Valid.			Replacement name for Brachygnathus Hussakof, 1909
Hybosteus	Gross	1933	Valid.			Replacement name for Coelosteus Gross, 1930
Incisoscutum	Dennis; Miles	1981	Valid.			
Jagorina	Jaekel	1921	Valid.			
Jaekelaspis	Heintz	1929	Valid.			
Janiosteus	Ivanov	1988	Valid.			
Jerulalepis	Burrow	1996	Valid.			
Jiangxilepis			Valid.			
Jiuchengia			Valid.			
Kendrichthys			Valid.			
Kiangyousteus			Valid.			
Kiangyosteus			Valid.			
Kimaspis	Mark-Kurik	1973	Valid.			
Kimberia	Dennis-Bryan; Miles	1983	Preocc.			Preoccupied by mollusc genus Kimberia Cotton & Woods, 1935
Kimberleyichthyes	Dennis-Bryan; Miles	1983	Valid.			Replacement name for genus Kimberia Dennis-Bryan & Miles, 1983
Kolpaspis	Pageau	1969	Valid.			
Kolymaspis	Bystrow	1956	Valid.			
Kosoraspis	Gross	1959	Valid.			
Kueichowlepis	P'an; Wang	1975	Valid.			
Kujdanowiaspis	Stensiö	1942	Valid.			
Kweichowlepis			Valid.			
Lataspis	Strand	1932	Valid.			Replacement name for Plataspis Heintz 1929
Latocamurus	Long	1988	Valid.			
Lanrentaspis	Pageau	1969	Valid.			
Laurentaspis			Lapsus Calami.			
Lepadolepis	White; Moy-Thomas	1940	Valid.			Replacement name for Ceratolepis Gross, 1933
Lehmanosteus	Goujet	1984	Valid.			
Leptosteus	Jaekel	1919	Valid.			
Liognathus	Agassiz	1846	Valid.			
Liognathus	Newberry	1873	Preocc.			Preoccupied by fish genus Liognathus Agassiz, 1846
Lispognathus	Miller	1892	Valid.			Replacement name for Liognathus Newberry, 1873
Litilpetalichthyes			Valid.			
Liujiangolepis	Wang	1987	Valid.			
Livosteus	Obruchev	1962	Valid.			
Lophostracon	Lankester	1884	Valid.			
Luetkeichthys	Bystrow	1957	Valid.			
Lunaspis	Broili	1929	Valid.			
Lyhoalepis	Tong-Dzuy; Janvier; Doan-Nhat	1994	Valid.			
Machaerognathus	Hussakof; Bryant	1919	Valid.			
Macropetalichthys	Norwood; Owen	1846	Valid.			
Macropetalichthys	Broili	1933	Preocc.			Preoccupied by fish genus Macropetalichthys Norwood & Owen, 1846
Maideria	Lelièvre	1995	Valid.			
Malerosteus	Kulczycki	1957	Valid.			
Materpiscis	Long; Trinajstic; Young; Senden	2008	Valid.			
Mcnamaraspis	Long	1995	Valid.			
Mediaspis	Heintz	1929	Valid.			
Megaloplax	Obruchev	1933	Valid.			
Melanosteus	Lelièvre; Goujet	1987	Valid.			
Microbrachius	Traquair	1888	Valid.			
Microsteus	Gross	1932	Valid.			
Millerosteus	Stensiö	1959	Valid.			
Mithakaspis	Young; Goujet	2003	Valid.			
Mizia	Zhu	1996	Valid.			
Monaspis	Heintz	1929	Valid.			
Murmur	Whitley	1951	Valid.			Replacement name for Euptychaspis White & Moy-Thomas 1941
Murrindalaspis	Long	1984	Valid.			
Mylostoma	Newberry	1883	Valid.			
Neopetalichthys	Liu	1973	Valid.			
Neophlyctaenius	Denison	1950	Valid.			
Nessariostoma	Broili	1933	Valid.			
Notopetalichthys	Woodward	1941	Valid.			
Oestophorus	Miller	1892	Valid.			Replacement name for Spenophorus Newberry, 1890
Ohioaspis	Wells	1944	Valid.			
Ohiodorulites	Whitley	1933	Valid.			Replacement name for Acanthapsis Newberry, 1975
Omalosteus	Zakharenko	2006	Valid.			
Operchaliosteus			Valid.			
Operchallosteus	Kulczycki	1957	Valid.			
Oracanthus	Agassiz	1837	Valid.			
Ottanosteus			Valid.			
Overtonaspis	White	1961	Valid.			
Oxyosteus	Jaekel	1911	Valid.			
Pachyosteus	Jaekel	1903	Valid.			
Pageauaspis	Denison	1978	Valid.			Replacement name for Quebecaspis Pageau, 1969
Palaeacanthaspis	Brotzen	1934	Valid.			
Palaeomylus	Woodward	1891	Valid.			
Panxiosteus	Wang	1979	Valid.			
Parabelosteus			Valid.			
Parabuchanosteus	White; Toombs	1972	Valid.			
Paramylostoma	Dunkle; Bungart	1945	Valid.			
Parapetalichthys	Kuhn	1949	Valid.			Replacement name for Macropetalichthys Broili, 1933
Paraplesiobatis	Broili	1933	Valid.			
Paraptyctodus			Valid.			
Parawalterosteus	Stensiö	1963	Valid.			
Pelycophorus			Valid.			
Phlyctaenacanthus	Eastman	1898	Valid.			
Phlyctaenaspis	Traquair	1890	Valid.			Replacement name for Phlyctaenius Traquair, 1890
Phlyctaenius	Traquair	1890	Preocc.			nec Phlyctaenium Zittel 1879
Pholidosteus	Jaekel	1907	Valid.			
Phyllolepis	Agassiz	1844	Valid.			
Phymolepis	Chang	1978	Valid.			
Phymosteus	Wang; Zhu	2004	Valid.			
Pinguosteus	Long	1990	Valid.			
Placolepis	Ritchie	1984	Valid.			
Plataspis	Heintz	1929	Preocc.			Preoccupied by hemiptere genus Plataspis Hope, 1837
Platyaspis	Koenen	1896	Valid.			
Plourdosteus	Ørvig	1951	Valid.			
Ponerichthys	Miller	1892	Invalid, declared a junior synonym of Dunkleosteus.			
Prescottaspis			Valid.			
Proaethaspis	Denison	1978	Valid.			
Procondylolepis	Zhang	1984	Valid.			
Prosphymaspis	Gross	1937	Valid.			
Protitanichthys			Valid.			
Pseudopetalichthys	Moy-Thomas	1939	Valid.			
Pterichthyodes	Bleeker	1859	Valid.			
Ptychaspis	Bryant	1935	Preocc.			Preoccupied by trilobite genus Ptychaspis Hall, 1863
Ptyctodopsis	Denison	1985	Valid.			
Ptyctodus	Pander	1858	Valid.			
Qataraspis	White	1969	Valid.			
Quasipetalichthys	Liu	1973	Valid.			
Quebecaspis	Pageau	1969	Preocc.			Preoccupied by trilobite genus Quebecaspis Rasetti, 1944
Qujinolepis	Zhang	1978	Valid.			
Rachiosteus	Gross	1938	Valid.			
Radotina	Gross	1950	Valid.			
Ramphodus	Davis	1883	Valid.			
Remigolepis	Stensiö	1931	Valid.			
Rhachiosteus	Gross	1938	Valid.			
Rhamphodontus			Valid.			
Rhamphodopsis	Watson	1934	Valid.			
Rhampodus			Valid.			
Rhenonema	Obruchev	1964	Valid.			
Rhinosteus	Jaekel	1911	Valid.			
Rhynchodontus	Jaekel	1919	Valid.			
Rhynchodus	Newberry	1873	Valid.			
Rhynchognathus	Jaekel	1929	Valid.			
Rhynchosteus	Jaekel	1925	Valid.			
Ringinia	Whitley	1950	Valid.			
Rinodus	Newberry; Worthen	1866	Valid.			
Rolfosteus	Dennis; Miles	1979	Valid.			
Romundina	Orvig	1975	Valid.			
Sedowichthys	Bystrow	1957	Valid.			
Selenosteus	Dean	1901	Valid.			
Shearsbyaspis	Young	1984	Valid.			
Sigaspis	Goujet	1973	Valid.			
Simblaspis	Denison	1958	Valid.			
Simosteus	Dennis; Miles	1982	Valid.			
Sinolepis	Liu; Pan	1958	Valid.			
Squamatognathus	Hanke; Stewart; Lammers	1996	Valid.			
Stenognathus	Newberry	1898	Preocc.			Preoccupied by coleoptere genus Stenognathus Chaudoir, 1843
Stenosteus	Dean	1901	Valid.			
Stensioella	Broili	1933	Valid.			
Steurtzaspis			Valid.			
Stuertzaspis	Westoll; Miles	1963	Valid.			
Svalbardaspis	Heintz	1929	Valid.			
Synauchenia	Jaekel	1919	Valid.			
Szelepis	Liu	1981	Valid			Originally named Szeaspis Liu (1979), but this name turned out to be preoccupied by the trilobite genus Szeaspis Chang, 1969
Taemasosteus	White	1978	Valid.			
Taeniolepis	Gross	1932	Valid.			
Tafilalichthys	Lehman	1956	Valid.			
Tapinosteus	Stensiö	1963	Valid.			
Taunaspis	Schmidt	1933	Valid.			
Tiaraspis	Gross	1962	Valid.			
Timanosteus	Obruchev	1962	Valid.			
Titanichthys	Newberry	1885	Valid.			
Tityosteus	Gross	1960	Valid.			
Tollichthys	Bystrow	1957	Valid.			
Tollodus	Mark-Kurik	1977	Valid.			
Tomaiosteus	Kulczycki	1957	Valid.			
Tongdzuylepis	Janvier; Phuong	1999	Valid.			
Toombsosteus	White	1978	Valid.			
Torosteus	Gardiner; Miles	1990	Valid.			
Trachosteus	Newberry	1890	Valid.			
Trematosteus	Jaekel	1927	Valid.			
Tropidosteus	Gross	1933	Valid.			
Tubalepis	Panteleyev	2003	Valid.			
Tubonasus	Dennis; Miles	1979	Valid.			
Uralosteus	Mark-Kurik; Young	2003	Valid.			
Vukhuclepis	Janvier; Thanh; Phuong; Truong	1997	Valid.			
Walterosteus	Stensiö	1959	Valid.			
Watsonosteus	Miles; Westoll	1963	Valid.			
Weejasperaspis	White	1978	Valid.			
Westralichthys	Long	1987	Valid.			
Wheathillaspis	White	1961	Valid.			
Wijdeaspis	Obruchev	1964	Valid.			
Wijeaspis			Valid.			
Williamsaspis	White	1952	Valid.			
Woodwardosteus	White; Moy-Thomas	1940	Valid.			
Wufengshania	Pan	2018	Valid			
Wuttagoonaspis	Ritchie	1973	Valid.			
Xichonolepis	Pan; Wang	1978	Valid.			
Xinanpetalichthyes			Valid.			
Yiminaspis	Dupret	2008	Valid.			
Yinosteus			Valid.			
Yunnanocanthus			Valid.			
Yunnanolepis	Liu	1963	Valid.			
Yurammia	Young	2005	Valid.			
Zhanjilepis	Zhang	1978	Valid.			

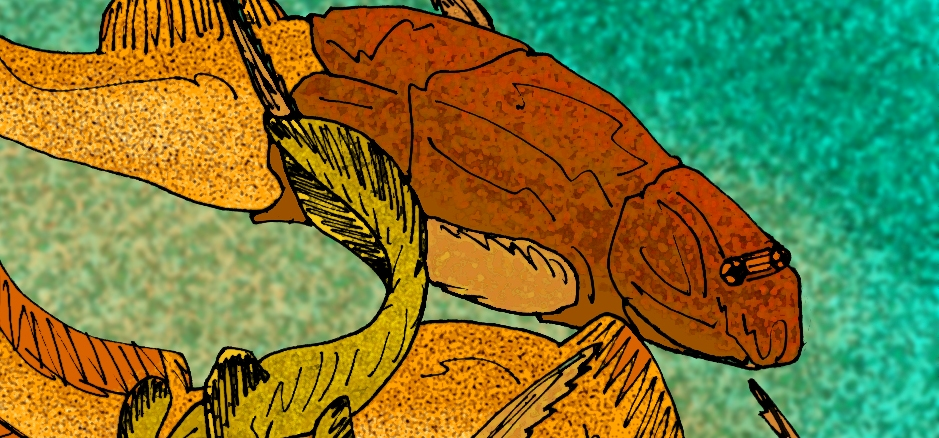
Austrophyllolepis

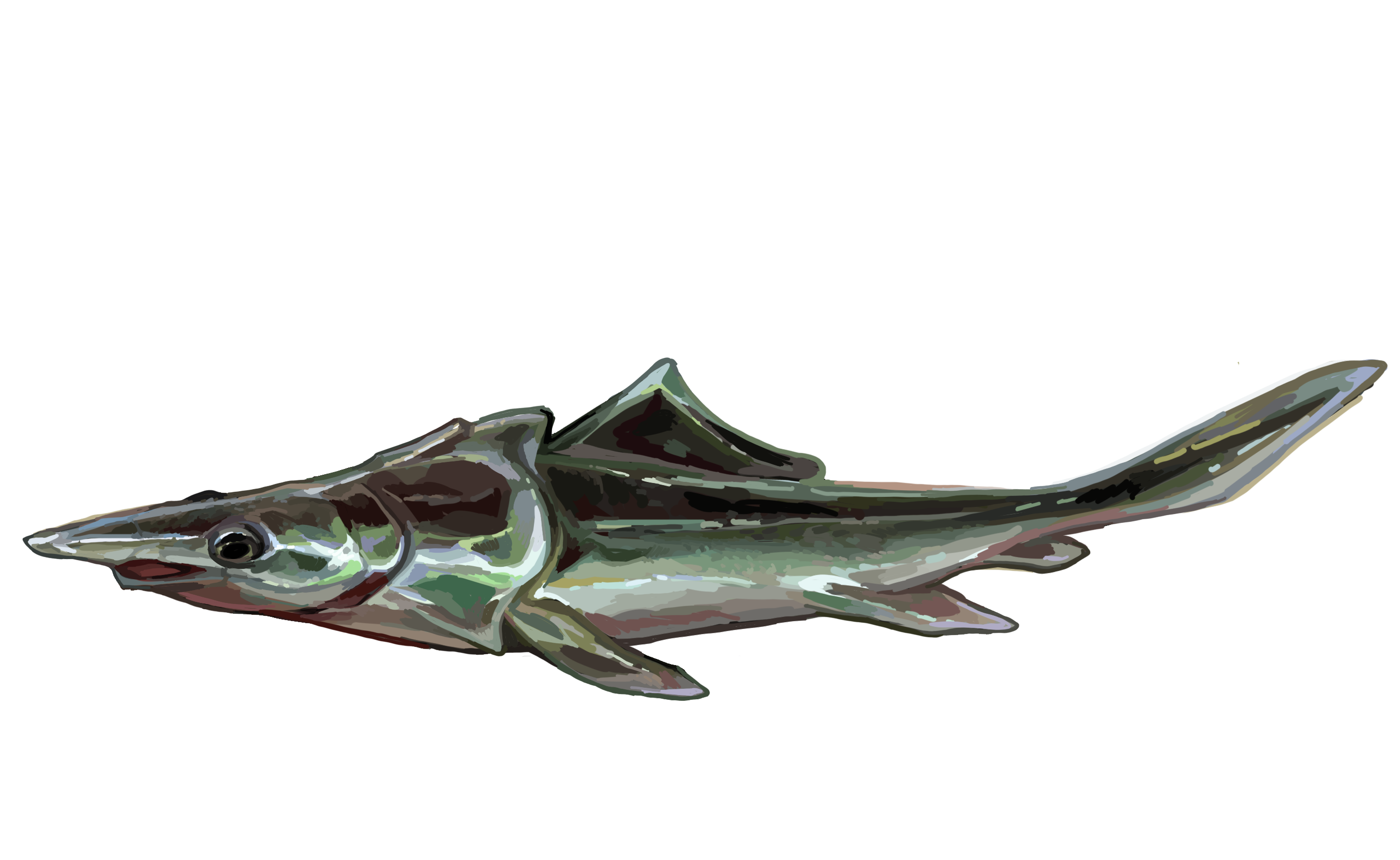
Brindabellaspis stensioi

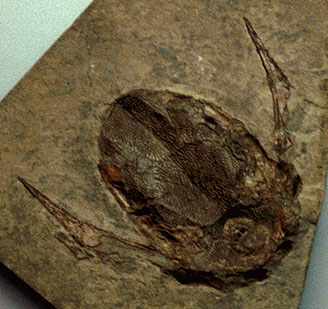
Bothriolepis

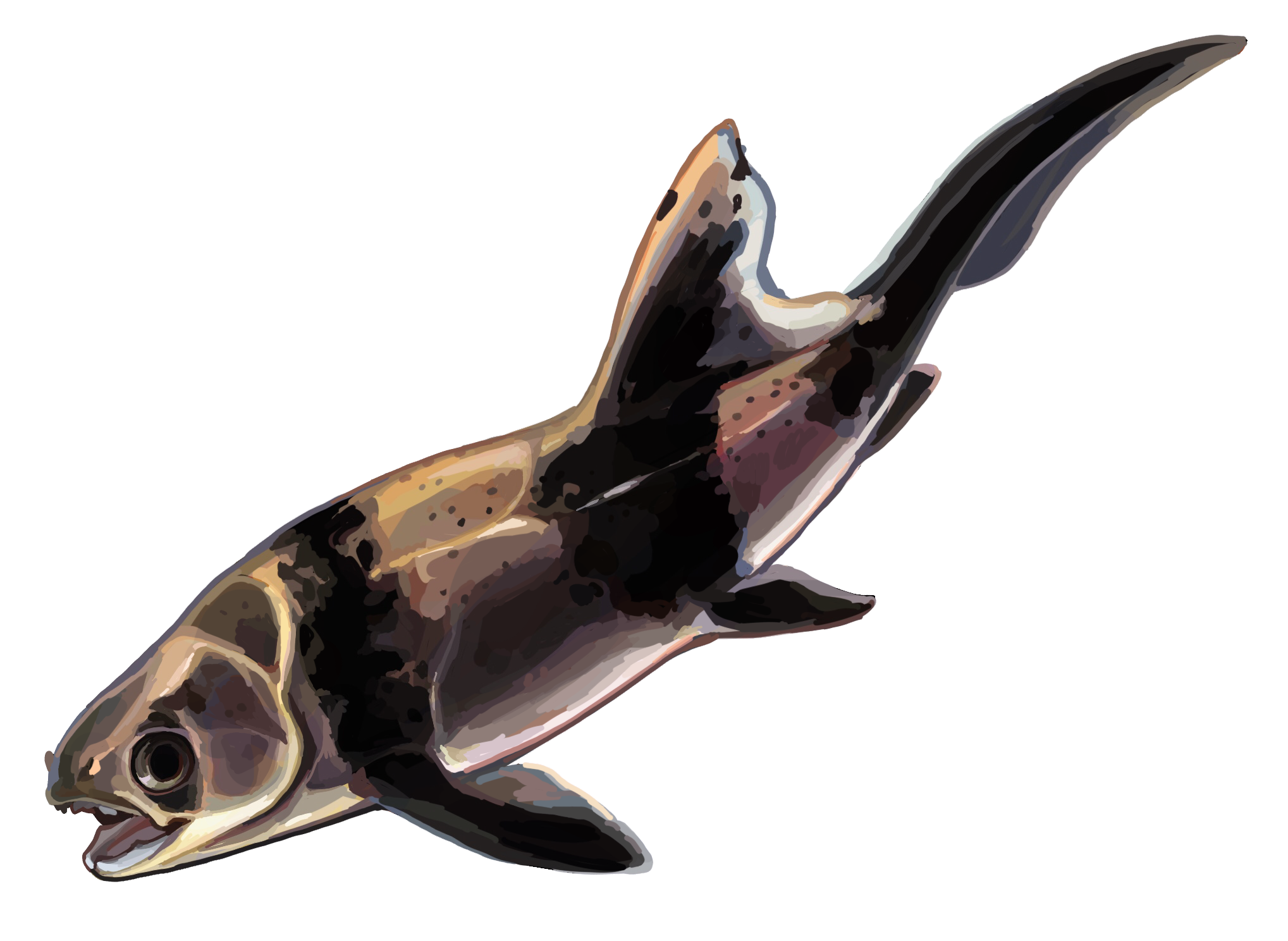
Coccosteus

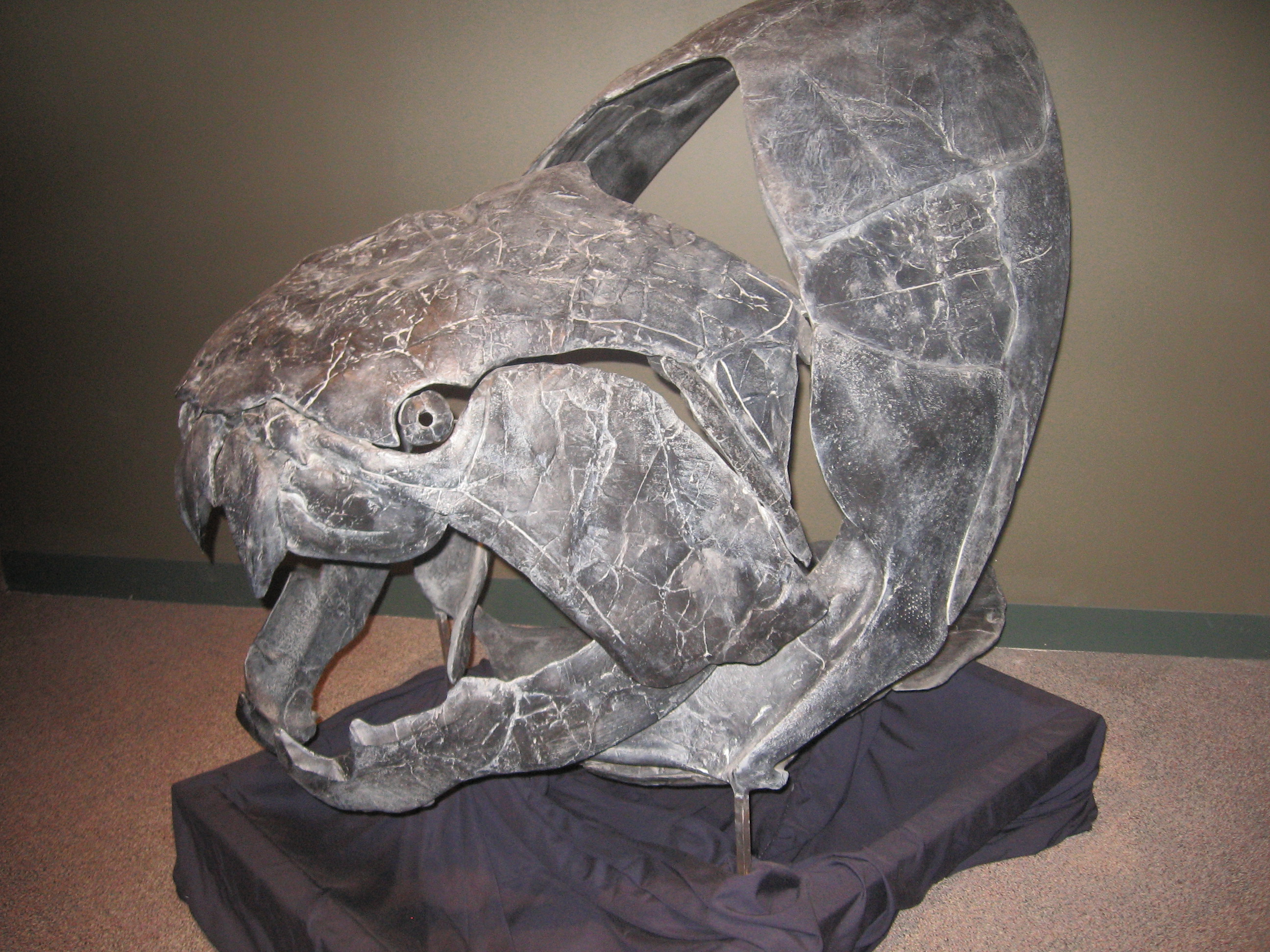
Dunkleosteus

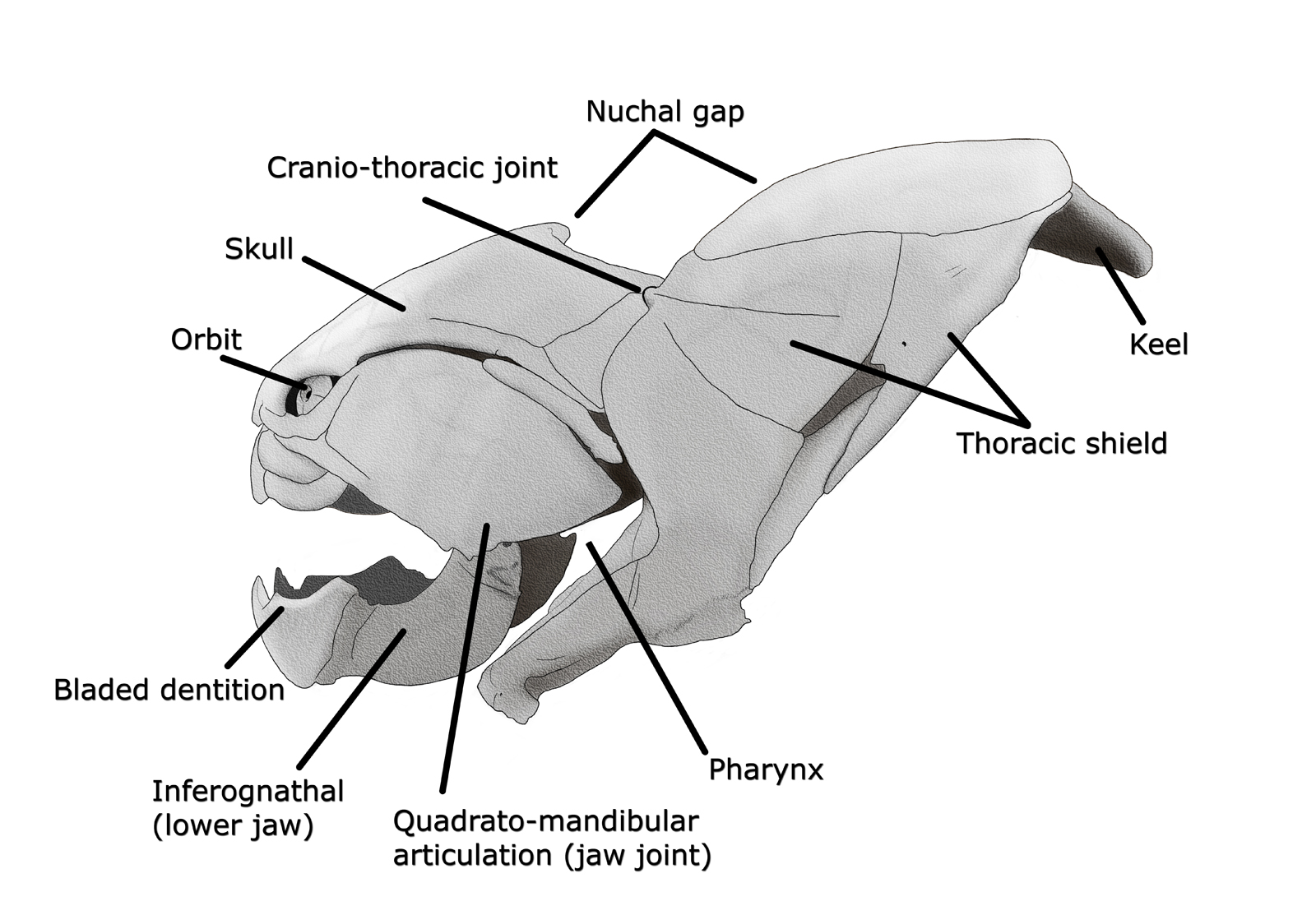
Dunkleosteus

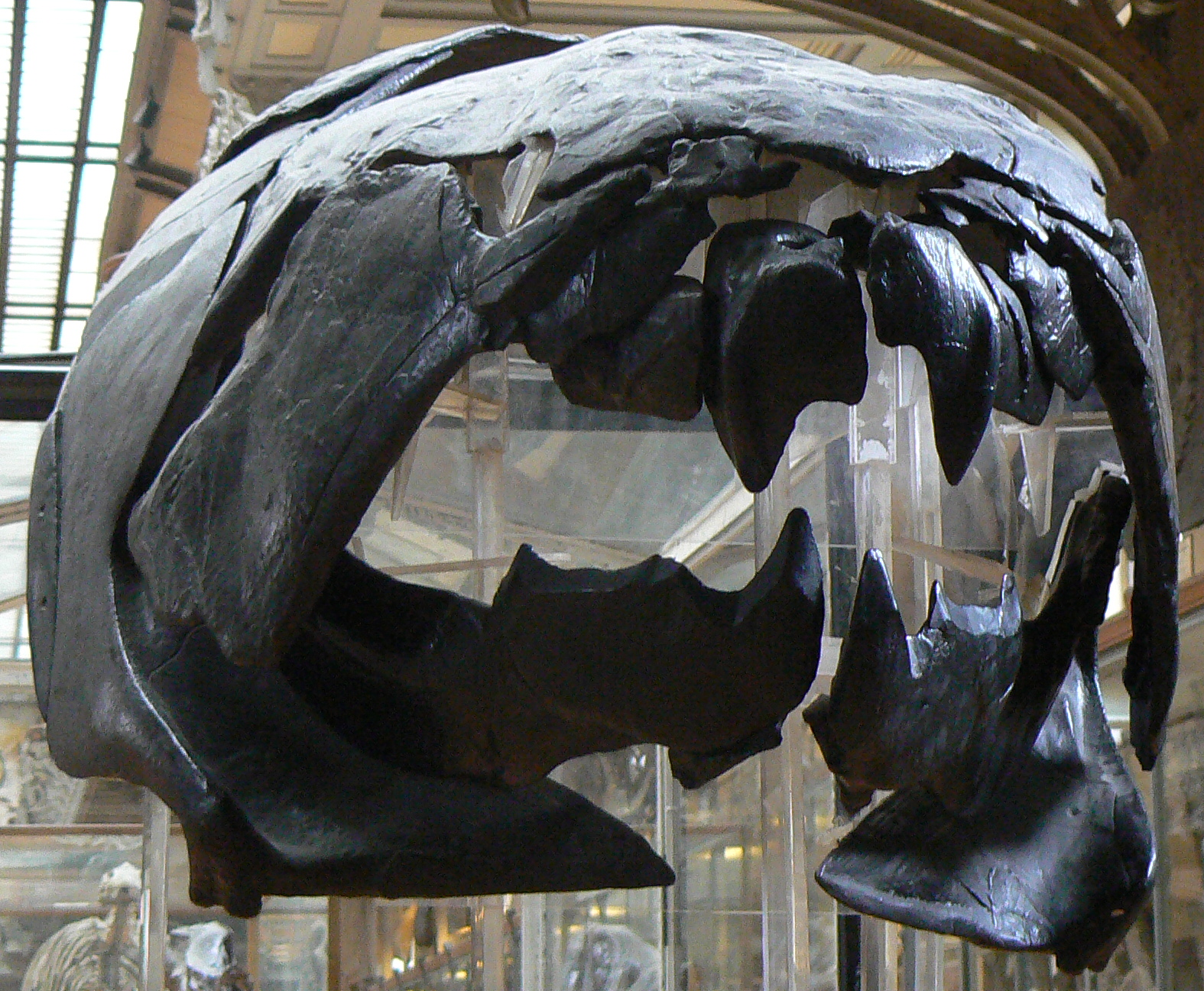
Dunkleosteus

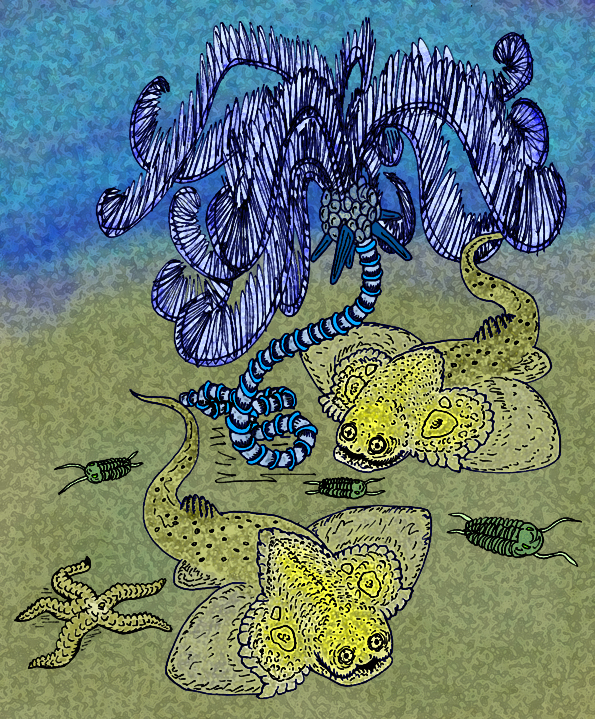
Gemuendina

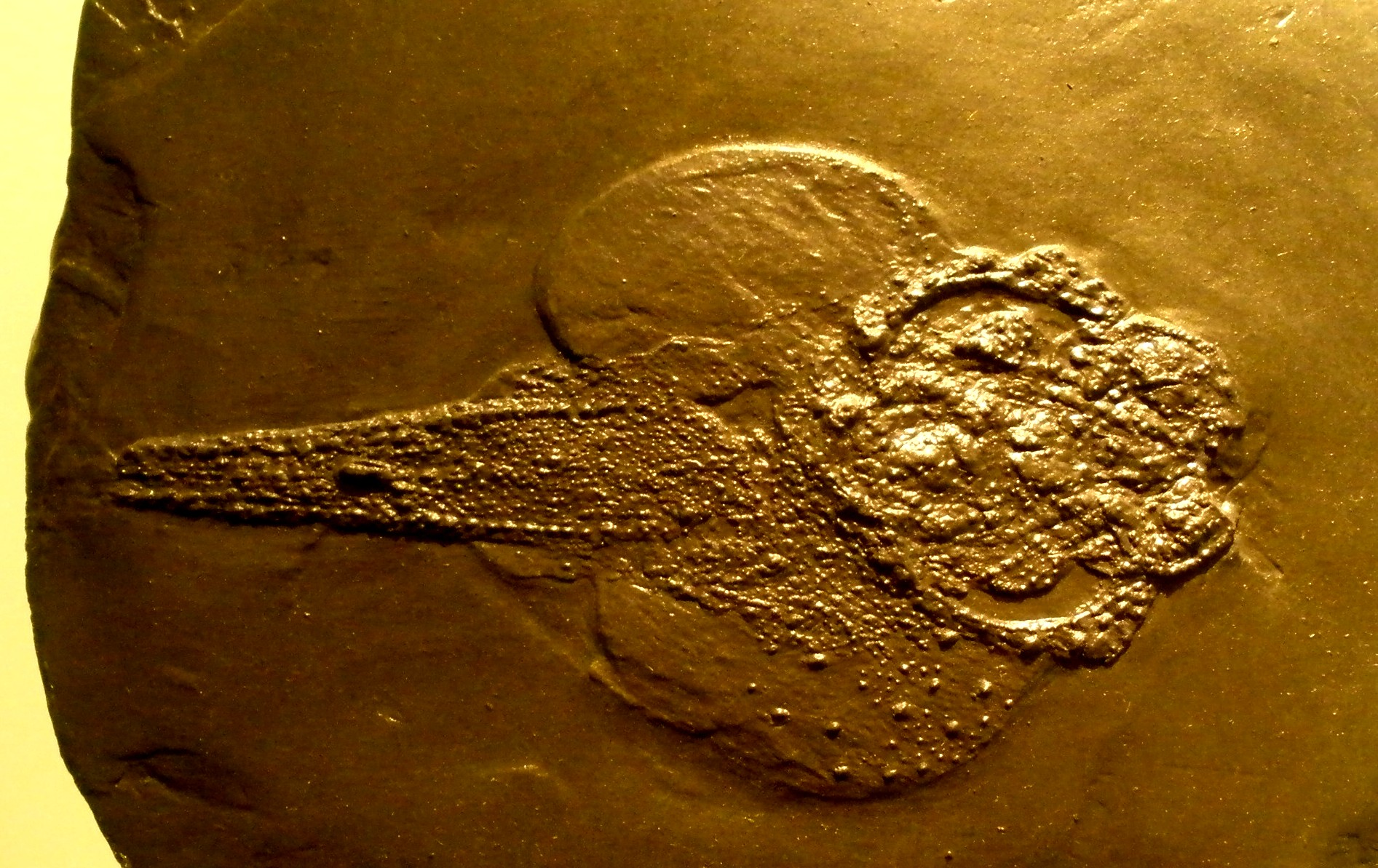
Gemuendina

Groenlandaspis

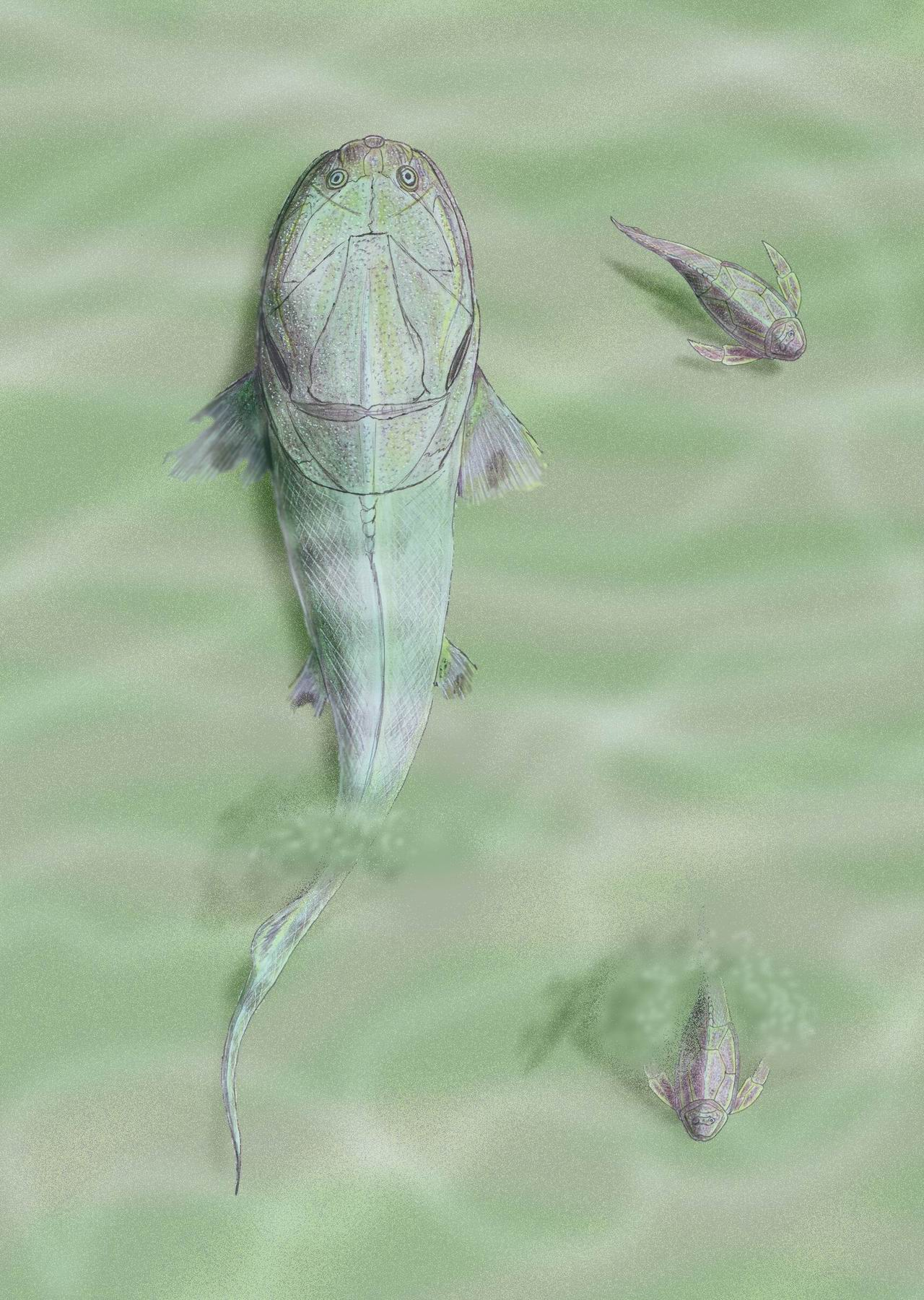
Homosteus

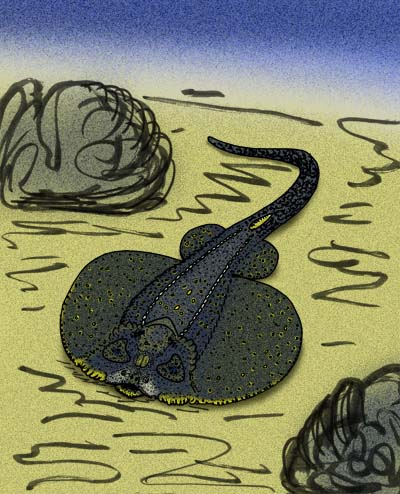
Jagorina

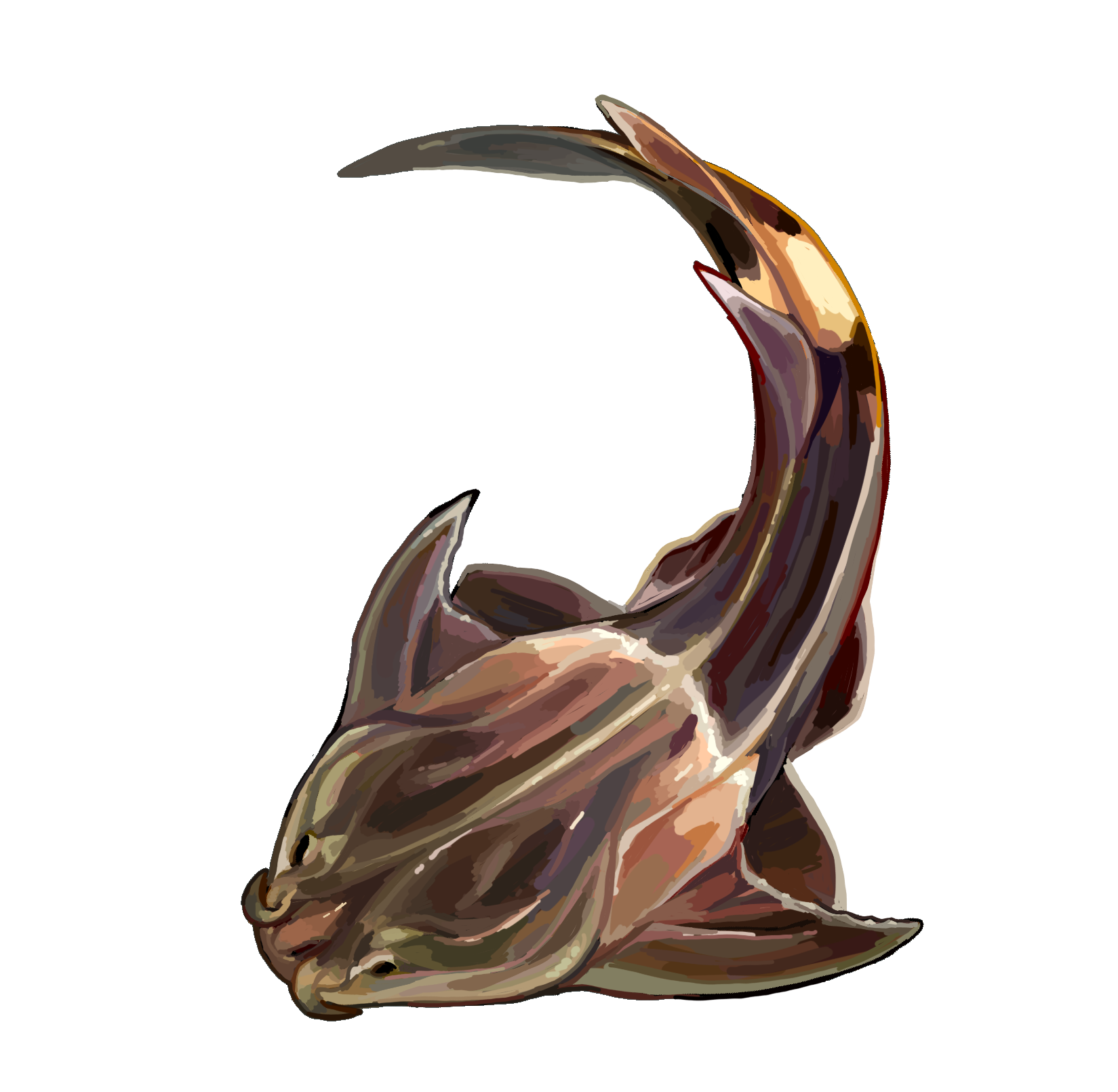
Lunaspis

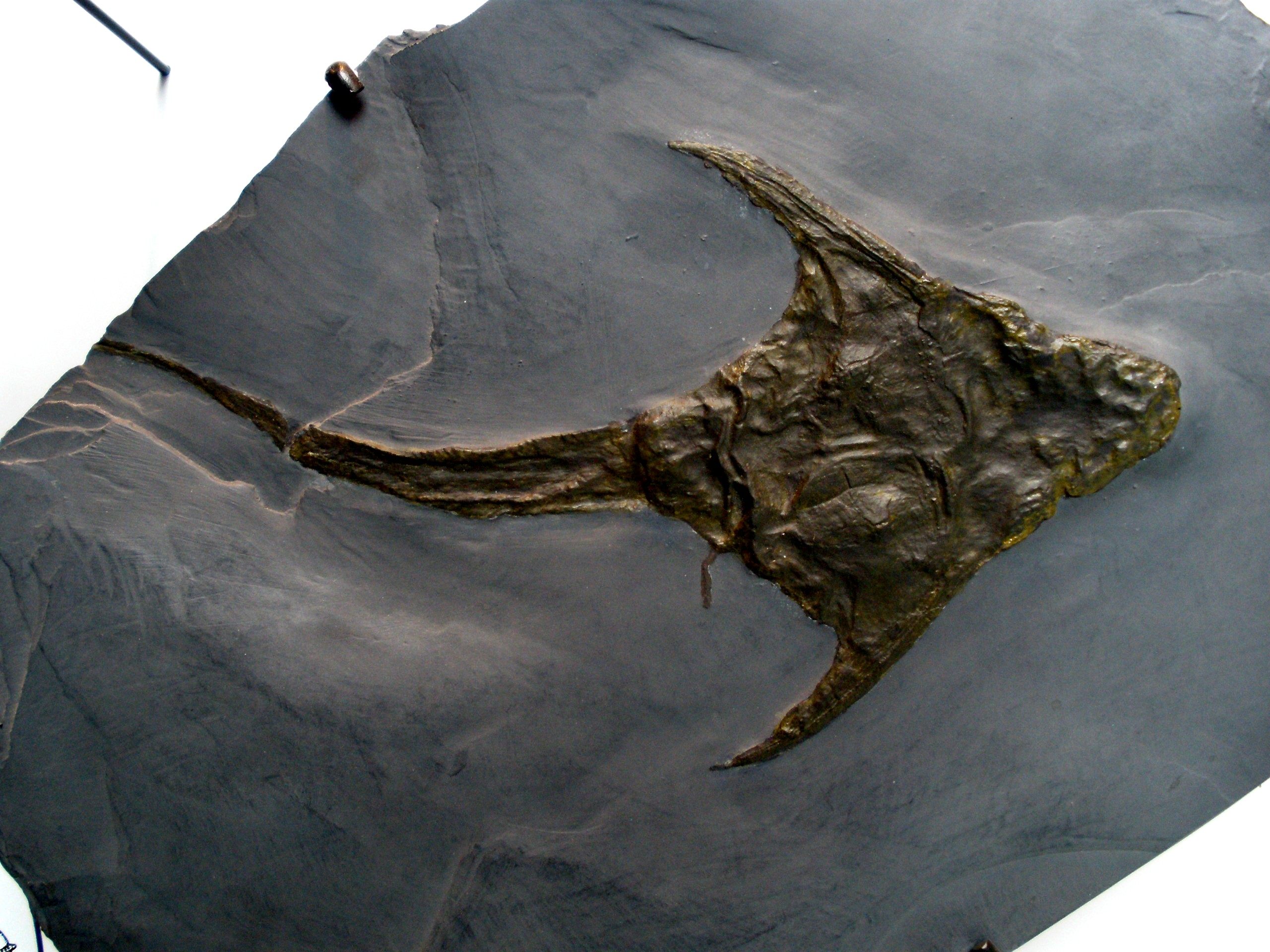
Lunaspis

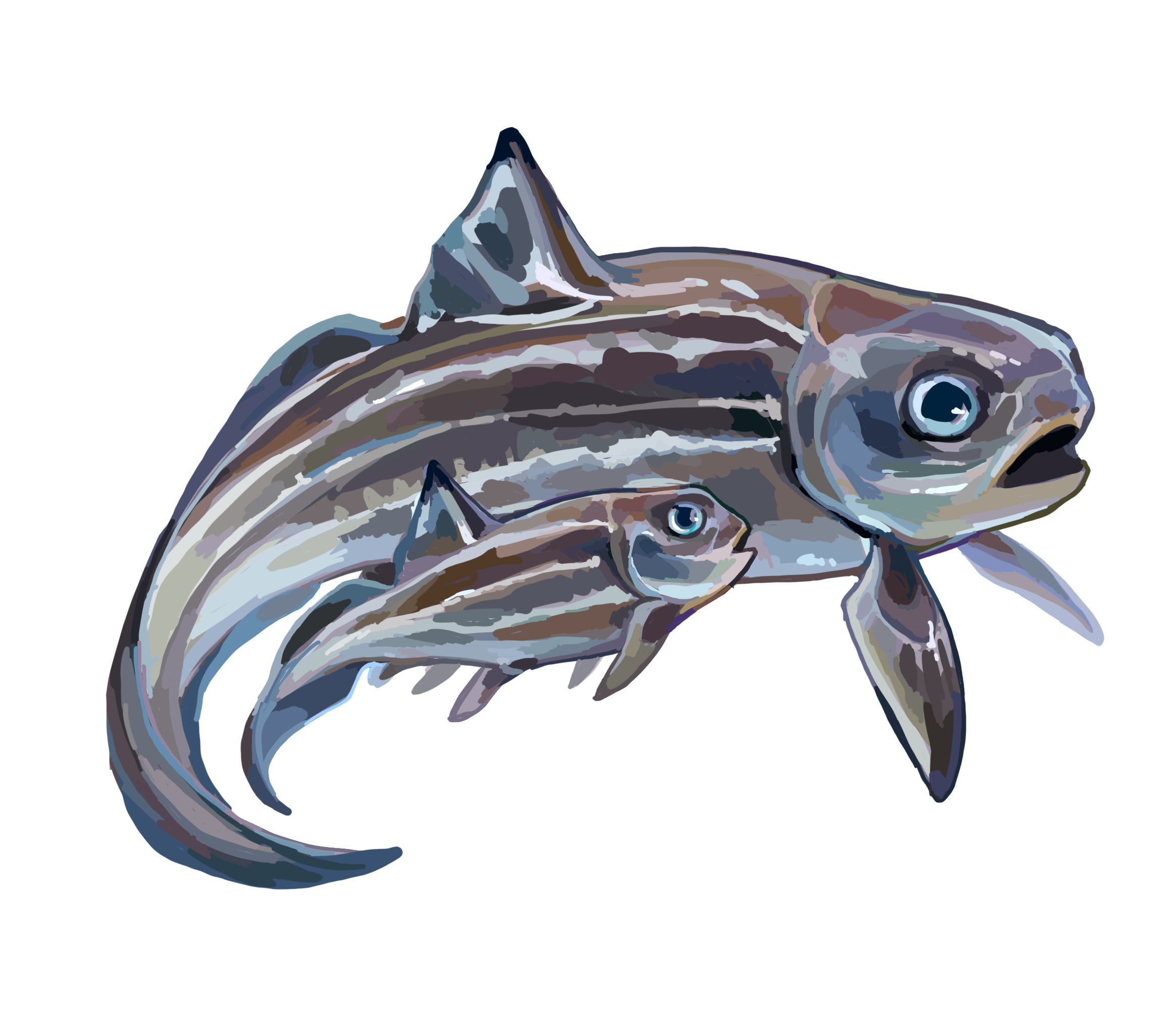
Materpiscis

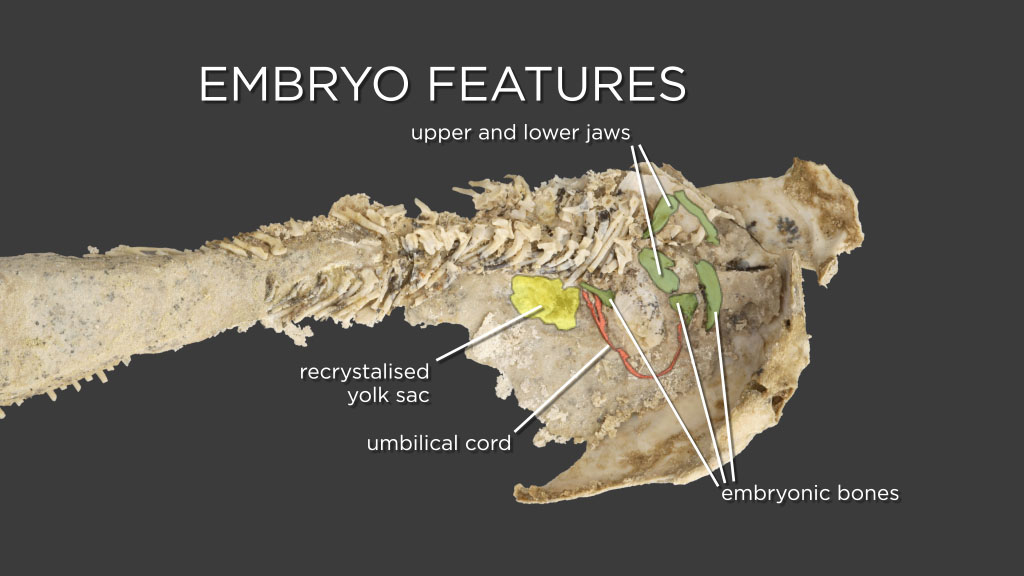
Materpiscis

Murrindalaspis

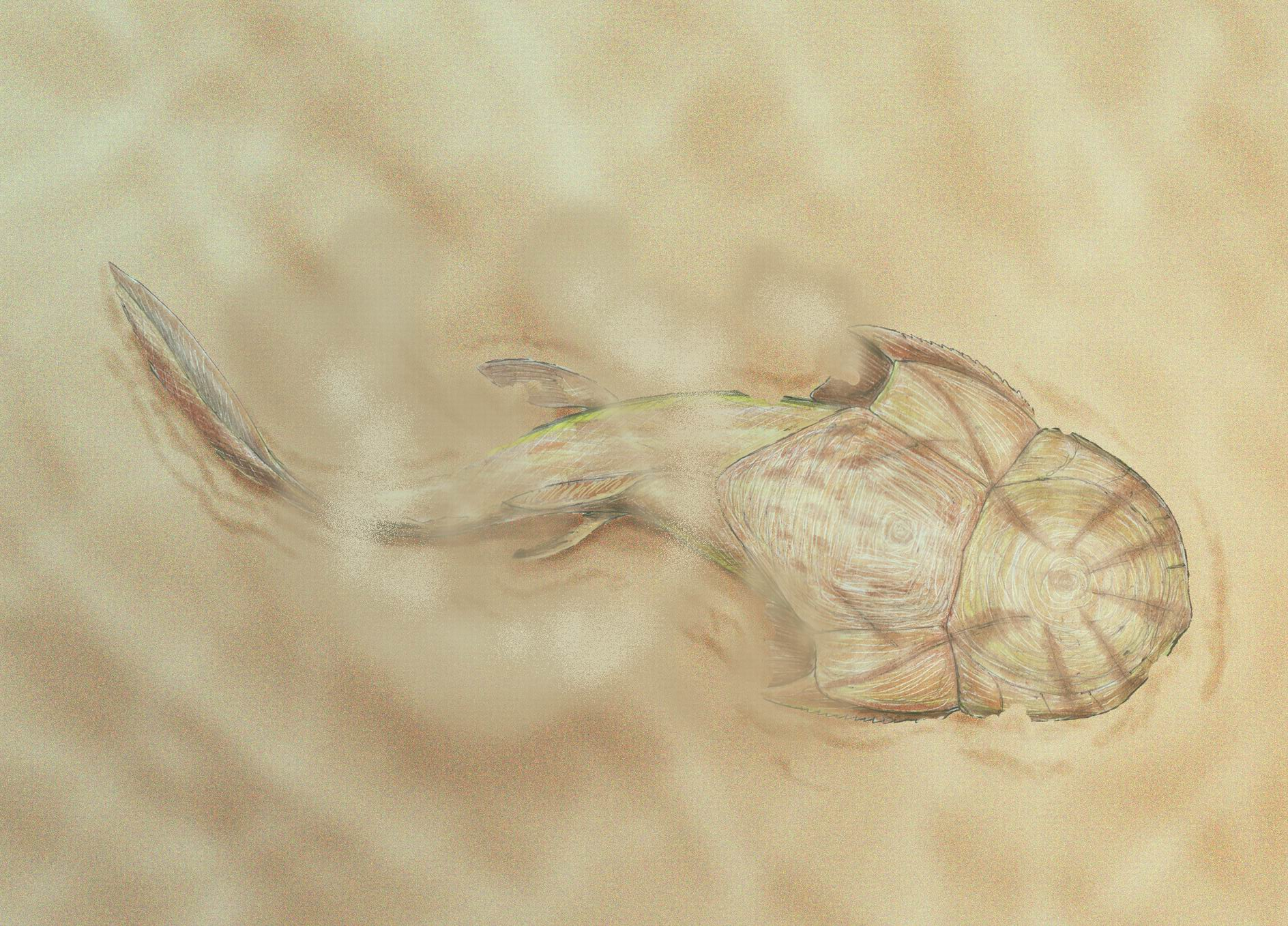
Phyllolepis

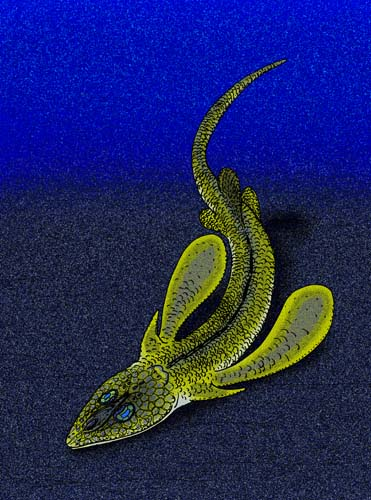
Pseudopetalichthys

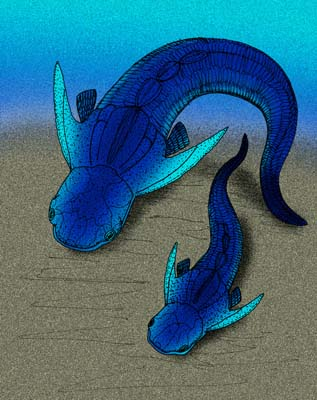
Quasipetalichthys

Rhamphodopsis

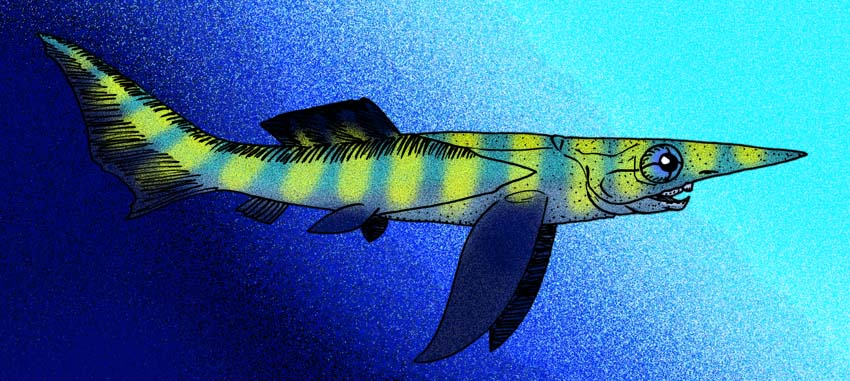
Rolfosteus

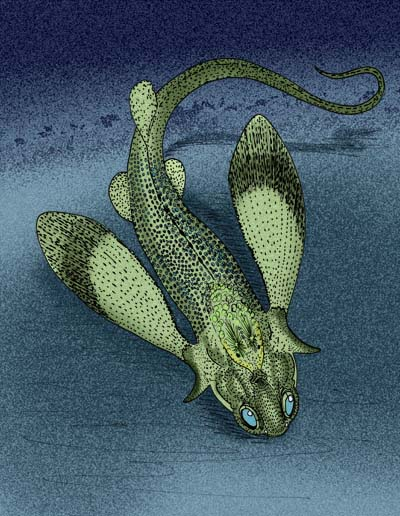
Stensioella

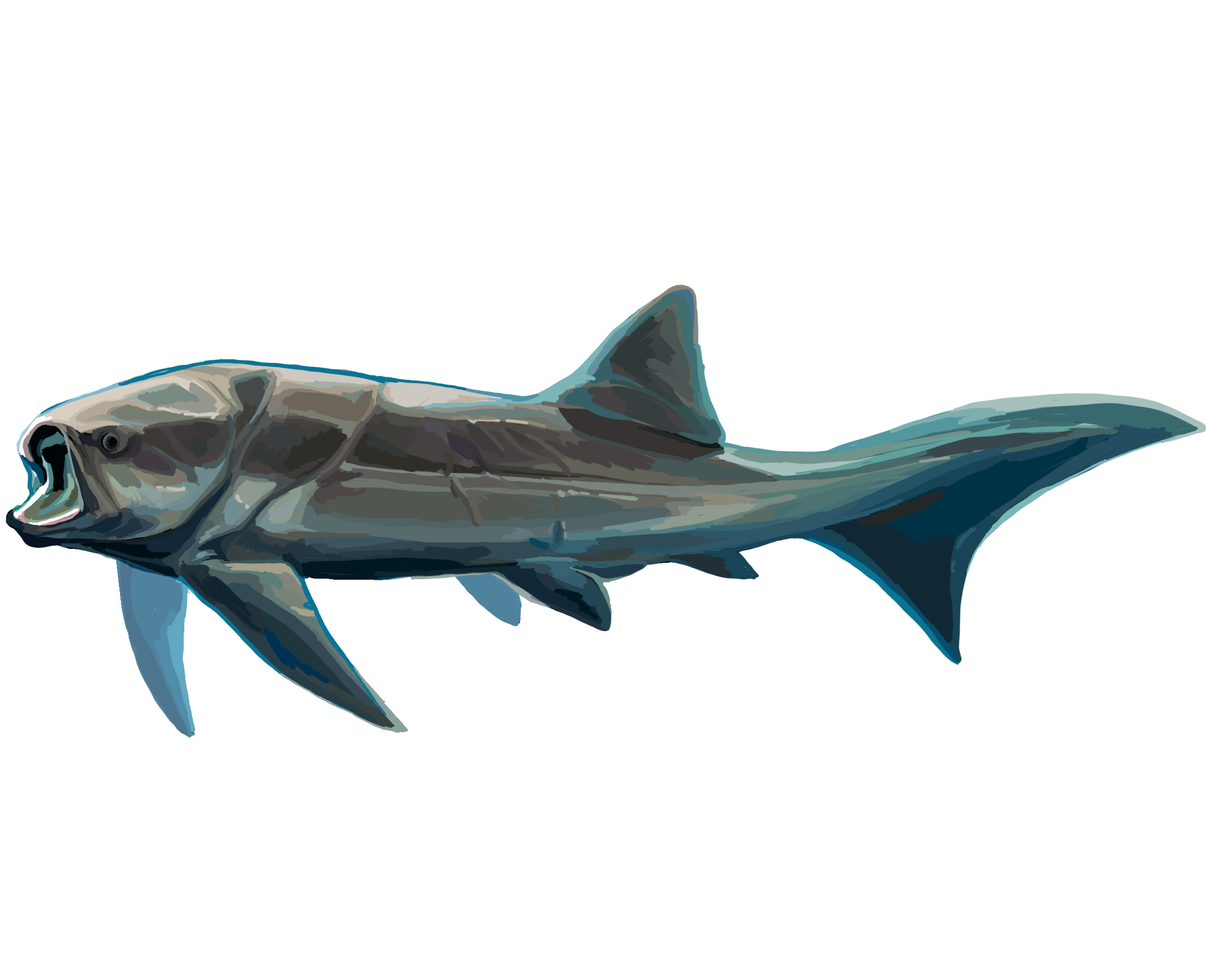
Titanichthys termieri

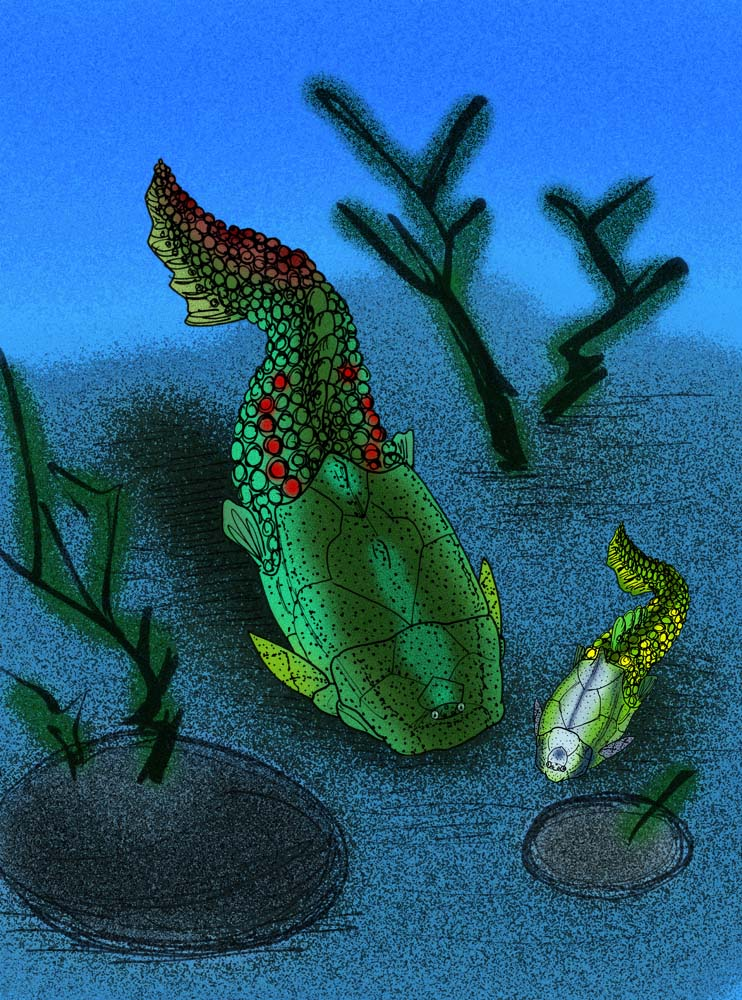
Yunnanolepis

== See also ==
- List of acanthodians
- List of prehistoric bony fish
- List of prehistoric cartilaginous fish
- List of prehistoric jawless fish
- Placodermi
- Prehistoric fish
