= Phlyctaeniidae =

Phlyctaeniidae Temporal range: Devonian
- Artist's reconstruction of Cartieraspis

Scientific classification
- Kingdom: Animalia
- Phylum: Chordata
- Class: †Placodermi
- Order: †Arthrodira
- Clade: †Phlyctaenioidei
- Family: †Phlyctaeniidae

Genera
- See text

Extinct family of fishes

Phlyctaeniidae is an extinct family of placoderm arthrodire fishes that lived during the Devonian period, mainly in Norway and North America.

== Classification ==
Order Arthrodira Woodward, 1891

- Phlyctaenioidei Miles, 1973
  - Brachythoraci Gross, 1932 - (includes the well-known Dunkleosteus, Dinichthys, etc.)
  - Williamsaspididae White, 1952
  - Groenlandaspididae Obruchev, 1964
  - Arctolepididae Heintz, 1937
  - Phlyctaeniidae Fowler, 1947
    - Aggeraspis Gross, 1962
    - Arctaspis Heintz, 1929
    - Arctolepis? Eastman, 1908 - (may instead belong to Arctolepididae)
    - Barwickosteus Young & Long, 2014
    - Cartieraspis Pageau, 1969
    - Diadsomaspis Gross, 1937
    - Dicksonosteus? Goujet, 1975 - (may not belong to Phlyctaeniidae)
    - Elegantaspis Heintz, 1929 - (may instead belong to trilobite genus Kazakhius)
    - Gaspeaspis Pageau, 1969
    - Grifftaylor Young & Long, 2014
    - Heintzosteus? Goujet, 1984 - (may instead belong to Arctolepididae)
    - Heterogaspis Strand, 1932
    - Huginaspis Heintz, 1929
    - Kolpaspis Pageau, 1969
    - Kueichowlepis Pan & Wang, 1975
    - Lyhoalepis Janvier, Tông-Dzuy & Doàn Nhât, 1994
    - Neophlyctaenius White, 1969
    - Pageauaspis Denison, 1978
    - Phlyctaenius Traquair, 1890
    - Prosphymaspis Gross, 1937
    - Stipatosteus Plax & Newman, 2020

== Phylogeny ==
Phlyctaeniidae's placement within Arthrodira can be shown in the cladogram below:

- - Eurycaraspis incilis
  - Lunaspis broilii
  - Arthrodira
    - Yujiangolepis liujingensis
    - - Antarctaspis mcmurdoensis
      - - Wuttagoonaspidae
          - Wuttagoonaspis fletcheri
          - Yiminaspis shenme
        - - - Aethaspis major
            - Aethaspis utahensis
          - - - Lehmanosteus hyperboreus
              - - - Aleosteus eganensis
                  - Simblaspis cachensis
                - - - Kujdanowiaspis buczacziensis
                    - Kujdanowiaspis podolica
                  - - - Erikaspis zychi
                      - Sigaspis lepidophora
                    - - Eskimaspis heintzi
                      - - Baringaspis dineleyi
                        - Proaethaspis ohioensis
                      - - Anarthraspis chamberlini
                        - Heightingtonaspis anglica
                        - Phyllolepida
                          - Gavinaspis convergens
                          - - Austrophyllolepis sp.
                            - Cowralepis mclachlani
                            - Phyllolepis orvini
                            - Placolepis budawangensis
            - - Actinolepidae
                - Bollandaspis woschmidti
                - - Actinolepis spinosa
                  - - Actinolepis magna
                    - Actinolepis tuberculata
              - - Bryantolepis brachycephalus
                - Phlyctaenioidei
                  - Phlyctaeniidae
                    - Pageauaspis russelli
                    - Phlyctaenius acadicus
                  - - - Groenlandaspidae
                        - Groenlandaspis antarctica
                        - Tiaraspis subilis
                      - - Arctaspidae
                          Dicksonosteus arcticus
                        - Arctolepidae
                          - Arctolepis decipiens
                          - Heintzosteus brevis
                    - Brachythoraci
                      - Antineosteus lehmani
                      - - Buchanosteus confertituberculatus
                        - Coccosteus cuspidatus
