= Stipatosteus =

Stipatosteus Temporal range: Lower Devonian Emsian

Scientific classification
- Domain: Eukaryota
- Kingdom: Animalia
- Phylum: Chordata
- Class: †Placodermi
- Order: †Arthrodira
- Family: †Phlyctaeniidae
- Genus: †Stipatosteus; Plax & Newman, 2020

Species
- †S. svidunovitchi Plax & Newman, 2020

Extinct genus of arthrodira

Stipatosteus is an extinct genus of phlyctaeniid arthrodire from the Lower Devonian of Belarus. The genus is only known from one species, being S. svidunovitchi from the Lepel Beds. Stipatosteus was the first Phlyctaenioideid to be found in the Devonian of Berlarus with only one other, Valentinaspis, being described since.

== Discovery ==
The material that would be later described as Stipatosteus is from the Korma 1 borehole drilled near the Zhlobin Saddle at depths of between 340.8 and 337.7 meters. These remains were collected with the remains of multiple species Acanthodians along with many pieces from indeterminate vertebrates and small fragments of invertebrates.

== Description ==
Stipatosteus is estimated to only be around 40-50 mm and is only known from four pieces of the trunk armor along with a few less complete fragments. Most of these plates have tubercles with star-shaped bases which are arranged in tightly-packed rows. These tubercles would have grown on top of one another as the animal aged causing some seen on the armor to have curving and splitting ridges moving outwards from the center. The spinal plates on the sides of the trunk are long and covered in rounded tubercles with only half of the spine extending out from where they attach to the anterior ventrolateral plate. There seems to be a lack of ornamentation on the anterior ventrolateral plate from the described remains, being the only part where in doesn't appear. These plates are very short when compared to other such as Phlyctaenius, being shorter than the posterior ventrolateral plates.

== Classification ==
The trunk armor of Stipatosteus is similar to a few different groups of placoderms such as that seen in Actinolepinans though lacks anterior ventral plate. This trait, along with the length of the spinal plates, put the genus within the family Phlyctaeniidae.
