= Cartieraspis =

Cartieraspis Temporal range: Middle Devonian
- Artist's reconstruction of Cartieraspis sp.

Scientific classification
- Kingdom: Animalia
- Phylum: Chordata
- Class: †Placodermi
- Order: †Arthrodira
- Family: †Phlyctaeniidae
- Genus: †Cartieraspis; Pageau, 1969

Genus of placoderm fishes

Cartieraspis is an extinct genus of Phlyctaeniid placoderm fish which lived during the Middle Devonian period in North America. Whether or not it is morphologically different enough from its close relative and contemporary Phlyctaenius to be considered generically distinct is dubious.
