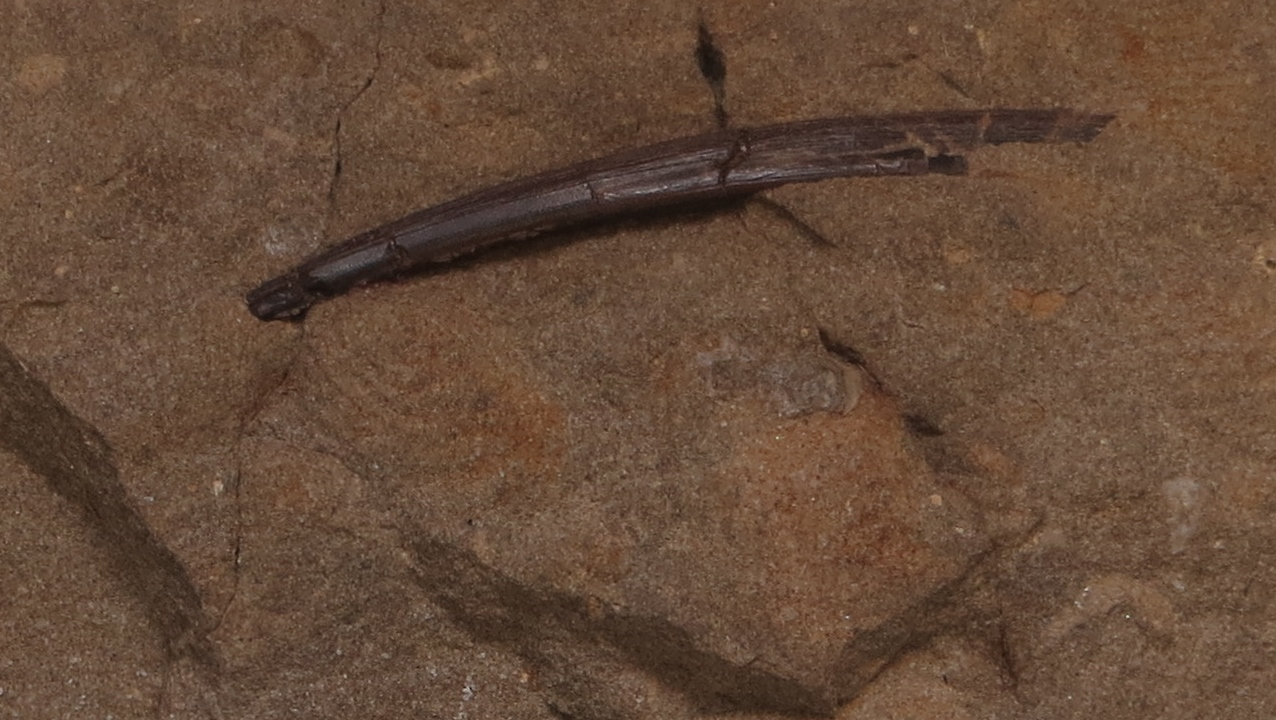
- Fossil of Cosmacanthus semistiatus - picture taken at Natural History Museum, Bonn University

Scientific classification
- Kingdom: Animalia
- Phylum: Chordata
- Class: †Placodermi
- Order: †Arthrodira
- Family: †Groenlandaspididae
- Genus: †Cosmacanthus; Agassiz, 1845

Species
- †C. bullatus (Saint John & Worthen, 1875) Hay, 1902; †C. carinatus Davis, 1883; †C. malcolmsoni (Agassiz, 1844); †C. marginalis Davis, 1883; †C. priscus (Mcoy, 1848); †C. sellatus (Saint John & Worthen, 1875 (Hay, 1902); †C. semistriatus

Synonyms
- Geisacanthus bullatus Satint John & Worthen, 1875; Geisacanthus stellatus Satint John & Worthen, 1875

= Cosmacanthus =

Cosmacanthus Temporal range: Late Devonian, 360.7–358.9 Ma

Extinct genus of fish

Cosmacanthus is an extinct genus of placoderms in the extinct family Groenlandaspididae that lived during the Late Devonian in Ireland, the UK, Russia and North America. It was named by Louis Agassiz in 1845.

Names brought to synonymy

- †Cosmacanthus elegans, a synonym for †Nemacanthus elegans Evans, 1904 (elasmobranch)

== See also ==
- List of placoderm genera
