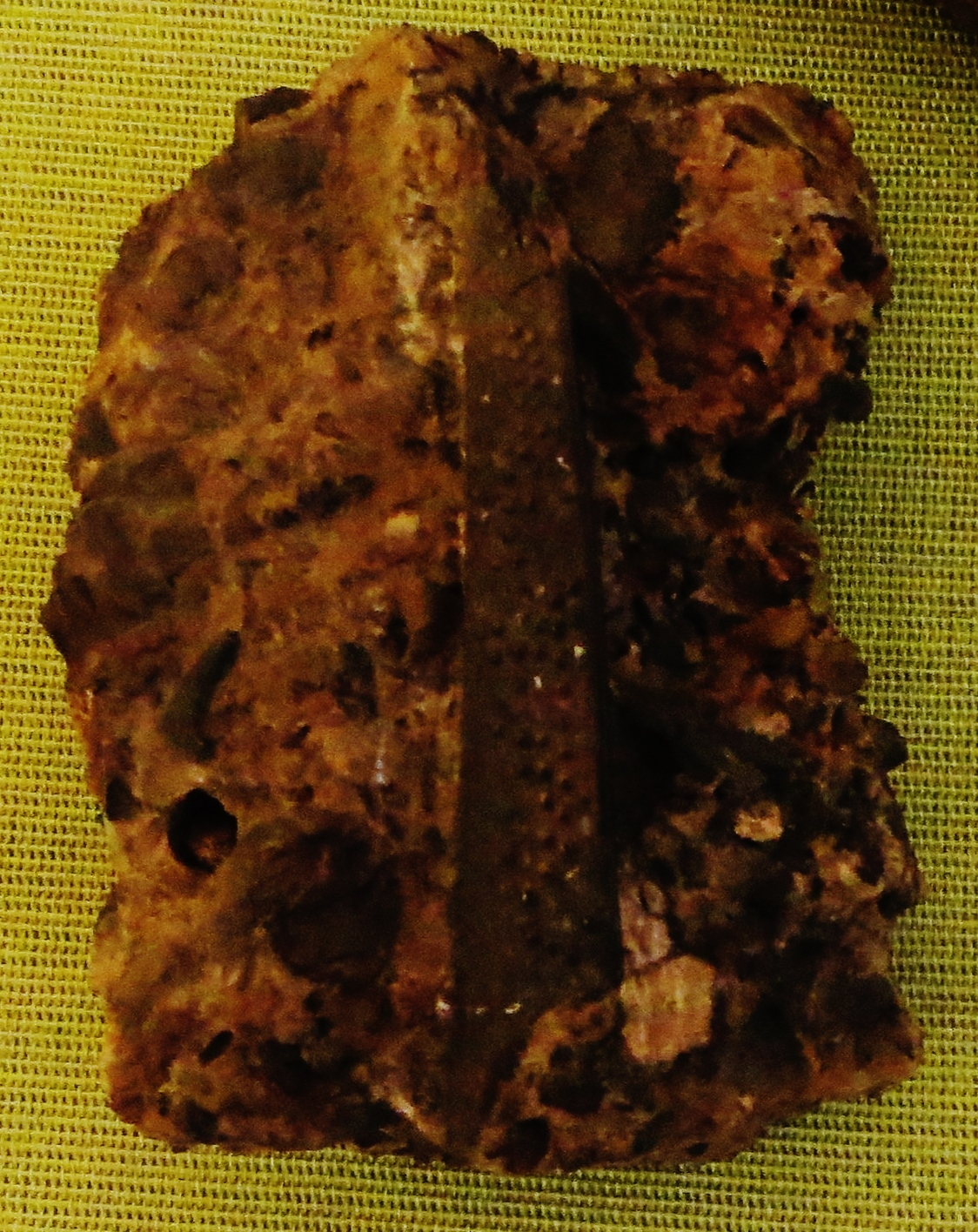
- Fossil of Nemacanthus monilifer - picture taken at Museum of Paleontology, Tubingen

Scientific classification
- Kingdom: Animalia
- Phylum: Chordata
- Class: Chondrichthyes
- Subclass: Elasmobranchii
- Order: †Synechodontiformes
- Family: †Palaeospinacidae
- Genus: †Nemacanthus; Agassiz, 1837

Species
- †Nemacanthus bosnensis (Katzer, 1916); †Nemacanthus elegans (Evans, 1904); †Nemacanthus filifer Agassiz, 1843; †Nemacanthus minor Davis, 1881; †Nemacanthus monilifer Agassiz, 1843; †Nemacanthus splendens Quenstedt

Synonyms
- Desmacanthus Quenstedt, 1858; †Cosmacanthus elegans (synonym of †Nemacanthus elegans Evans, 1904)

= Nemacanthus =

Nemacanthus Temporal range: 268.0–201.6 Ma

Extinct genus of cartilaginous fishes

Nemacanthus (from Greek: νέμω némō, 'to distribute' and Greek: ἄκανθα akantha, 'spine') is an extinct genus of cartilaginous fish in the family Palaeospinacidae.

The geologically oldest records of Nemacanthus sp. date to the Middle Permian. This includes records of Nemacanthus sp. from the Wordian age Khuff Formation of Oman. The species N. elegans is from the Triassic of Idaho, United States.

== See also ==
- List of prehistoric cartilaginous fish genera
