= Gaspeaspis =

Gaspeaspis Temporal range: Middle Devonian

Scientific classification
- Kingdom: Animalia
- Phylum: Chordata
- Class: †Placodermi
- Order: †Arthrodira
- Family: †Phlyctaeniidae
- Genus: †Gaspeaspis; Pageau, 1969

Extinct genus of fishes

Gaspeaspis is an extinct genus of placoderm fish, which lived during the Middle Devonian period of North America.
