= Huginaspis =

Huginaspis Temporal range: Middle Devonian

Scientific classification
- Kingdom: Animalia
- Phylum: Chordata
- Class: †Placodermi
- Order: †Arthrodira
- Clade: †Phlyctaenioidei
- Family: †Phlyctaeniidae
- Genus: †Huginaspis; Heintz, 1929

Species
- †Huginaspis australis Young & Goujet, 2003; †Huginaspis broeggeri Heintz, 1929; †Huginaspis vogti Heintz, 1929

Extinct genus of fish

Huginaspis is an extinct genus of placoderm arthrodire fish which lived during the Early Devonian to Middle Devonian period of Spitsbergen, Norway and Queensland, Australia.
