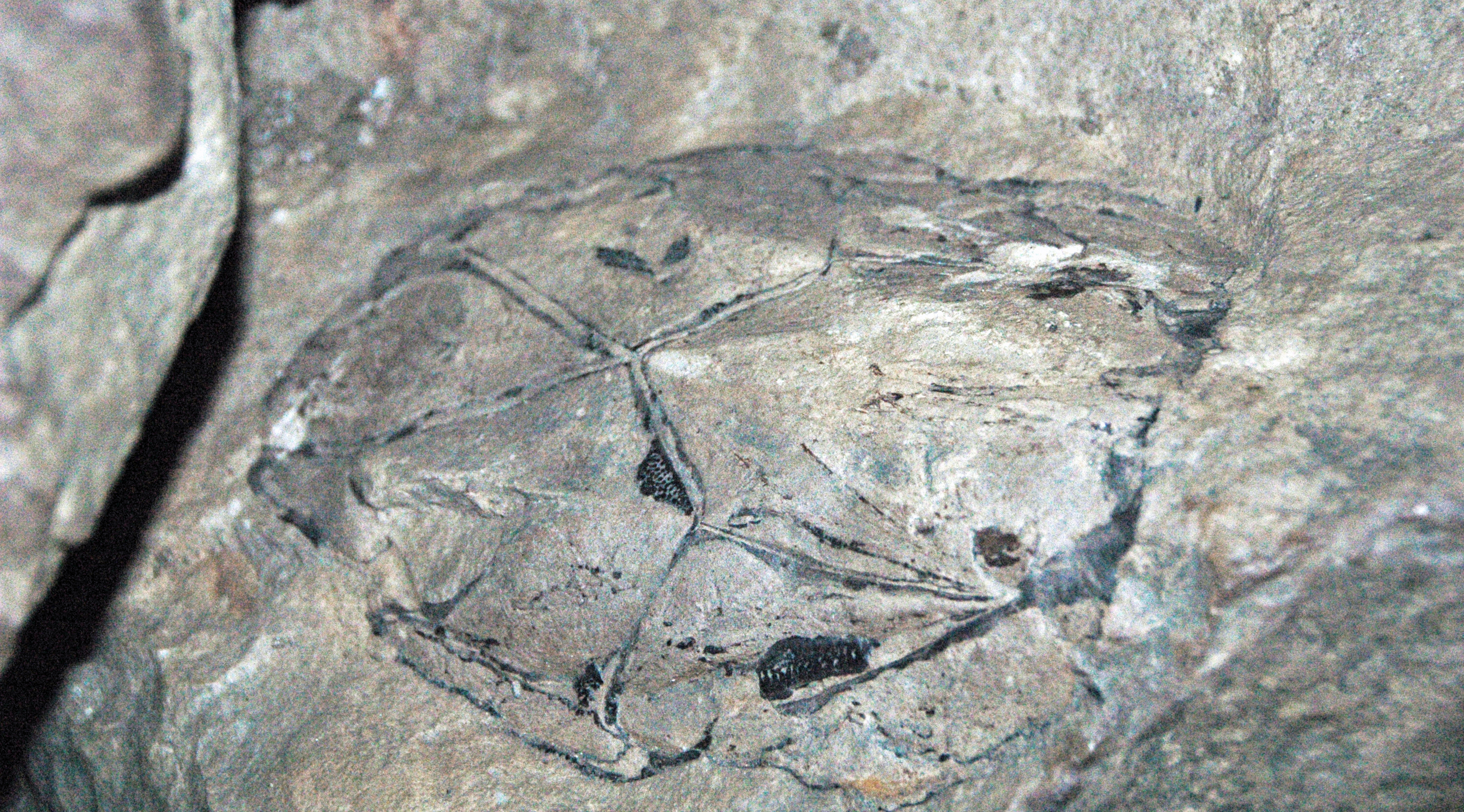
- Fossil

Scientific classification
- Kingdom: Animalia
- Phylum: Chordata
- Class: †Placodermi
- Order: †Petalichthyida
- Family: †Macropetalichthyidae
- Genus: †Macropetalichthys; Norwood & Owen, 1846

Type species
- Macropetalichthys rapheidolabis Norwood & Owen, 1846

Synonyms
- Acanthaspis Newberry, 1875; Heintzaspis Strand, 1932; Ohiodorulites Whitley, 1933

= Macropetalichthys =

Macropetalichthys Temporal range: Early Devonian

Extinct genus of fishes

Macropetalichthys is a genus of placoderm fish, named by Norwood and Owen in 1846. The name "Macropetalichthys" means "armor-plated fish". It was assigned to Arthrodira by Woodward (1891); and to Petalichthida by Sepkoski (2002). The best known species in the genus is the type species, Macropetalichthys rapheidolabis. The type species was originally described from the Deputy Limestone (Devonian) of Indiana, but the specimen on which the name was based was destroyed by fire in 1891. A neotype was designated by Babcock (2025) from the Delaware Limestone (Middle Devonian, Eifelian) of Columbus, Ohio, USA. The species is moderately common in the Columbus Limestone of Ohio, and less common in the Onondaga Limestone of New York, the Silica Shale of Ohio, and in other Early–Middle Devonian formations of midwestern and eastern North America. Two other species are known from Germany.

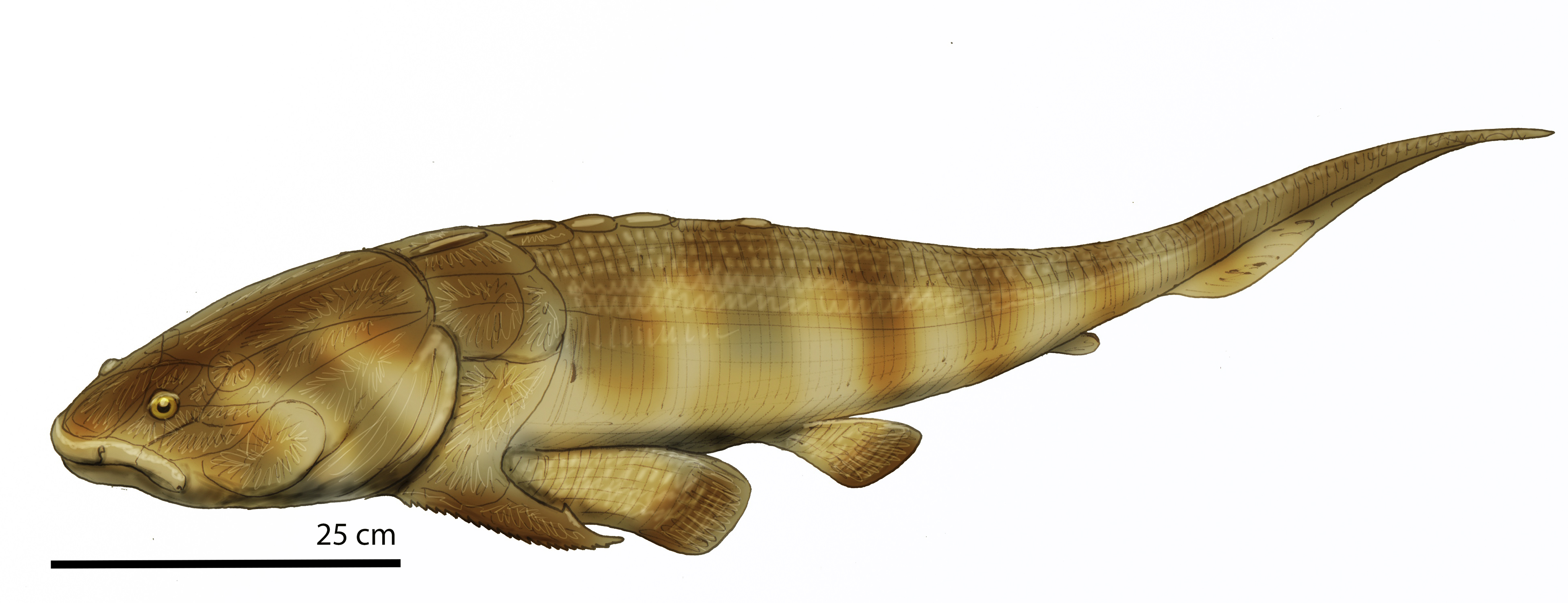
Life restoration

- Range: Early-Middle Devonian (Emsian–Eifelian) of North America and Europe.
- Characters: Like primitive Arthrodira. Dorsoventrally compressed; orbits face dorsally; widely splayed pectoral fins, with cornua common; no post-pectoral plates; plates ornamented with linear rows of tubercles.
- Life habit: possibly nektobenthic.

== Species ==
Data from:

- Macropetalichthys agassizi Meyer, 1846
- Macropetalichthys pelmensis Hennig, 1907
- Macropetalichthys rhapheidolabis Norwood & Owen, 1846
