= Ailuracantha =

Ailuracantha Temporal range: Early Devonian
- Artist's reconstruction of A. dorsofelis

Scientific classification
- Kingdom: Animalia
- Phylum: Chordata
- Class: †Placodermi
- Order: †Arthrodira
- Family: †Actinolepidae
- Genus: †Ailuracantha
- Species: †A. dorsifelis

Binomial name
- †Ailuracantha dorsifelis White, 1969

Genus of fishes

Ailuracantha is a montotypic genus of extinct placoderm from the family actinolepidae. It was discovered in the Senni Beds: a Devonian aged rock formation near the Black Mountains of Wales, and is represented by only one species: Ailuracantha dorsifelis.

== Etymology ==
The generic name Ailuracantha comes from the Greek αἴλουρος (aílouros), meaning "cat", and ἄκανθος (akanthos), meaning "spine" or "thorn"; the type species dorsifelis comes from the Latin dorsum, meaning "back," and felis, also meaning "cat." Both specific and generic names are in reference to The Cat's Back, a spur of the Black Mountains and the locality the holotype was recovered from.

== Description ==
Ailuracantha's body plan is relatively standard for an actinolepid, possessing a small, slightly dorsoventrally flattened body with two proportionally large spines on its thoracic shield. Unlike other members of this taxonomic group, its pectoral spines possess a narrow under surface and deep mesial surface. This fish arrangement may suggest that it had greater mobility than what is inferred from observations in its relatives. The frontal region of its head shield is ornamented with small, oval-shaped tubercles, which are extremely fine on the ventral side of its body.

== Paleobiology ==
Ailuracantha was a freshwater fish that likely lived in alluvial channels, wetlands, and oxbows on a semi-arid floodplain, as evidenced by the lithology of the rocks in which it was found. It was probably a benthopelagic predator that fed on small, soft-bodied invertebrates.
