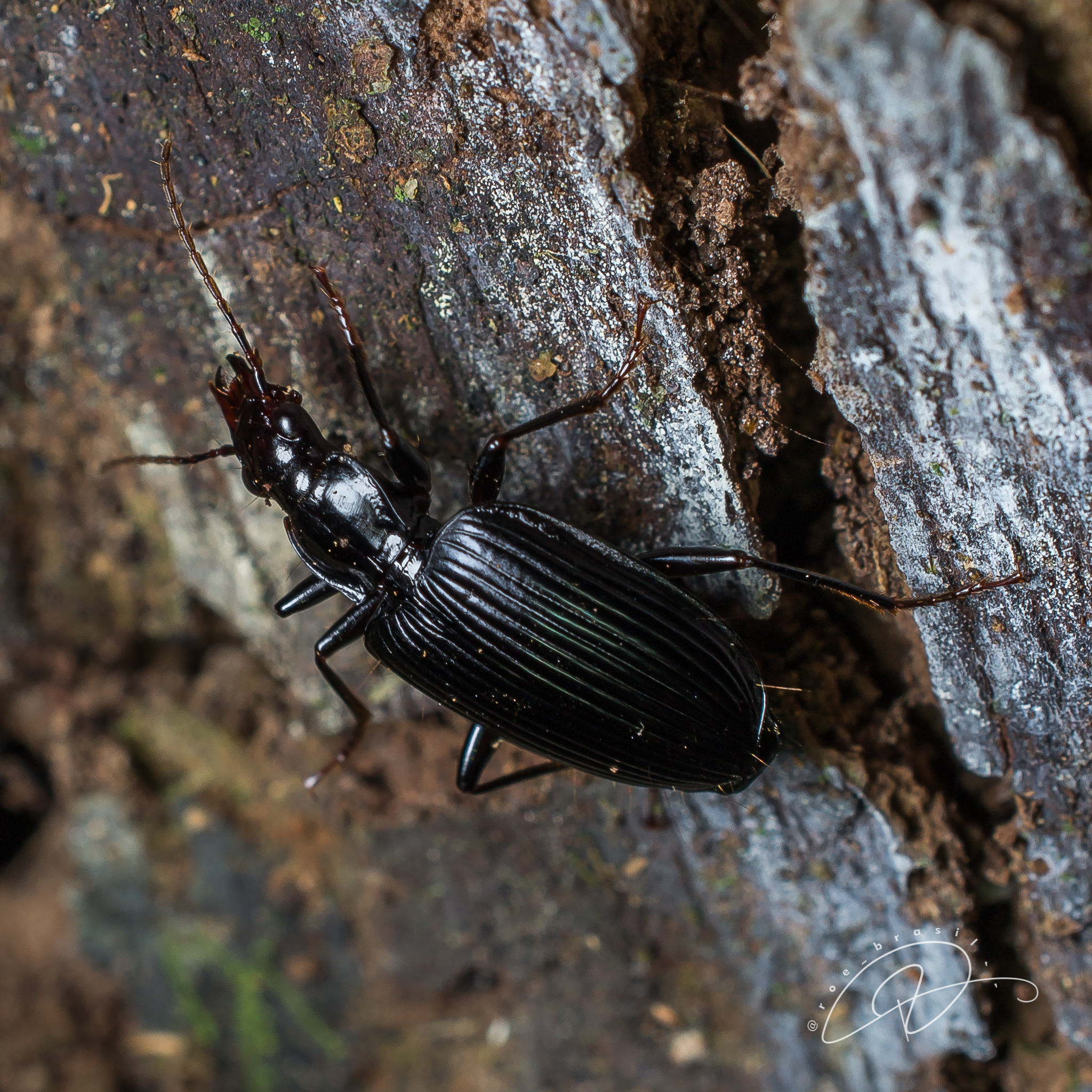
- Stenognathus, Brasil

Scientific classification
- Domain: Eukaryota
- Kingdom: Animalia
- Phylum: Arthropoda
- Class: Insecta
- Order: Coleoptera
- Suborder: Adephaga
- Family: Carabidae
- Subfamily: Lebiinae
- Tribe: Lebiini
- Subtribe: Pericalina
- Genus: Stenognathus; Chaudoir, 1843

Subgenera
- Gnathostenus Shpeley & Ball, 2000; Pristolomus Chaudoir, 1870; Prostenognathus Shpeley & Ball, 2000; Stenognathus Chaudoir, 1843

Synonyms
- Ferus de Chaudoir, 1869; Phloeotherates Bates, 1869; Pristolomus Chaudoir, 1869

= Stenognathus =

Genus of beetles

Stenognathus is a genus in the ground beetle family Carabidae. There are at least 20 described species in Stenognathus, found in Central and South America.

== Species ==
These 20 species belong to the genus Stenognathus:

- Stenognathus batesi Chaudoir, 1877 (Panama, Nicaragua)
- Stenognathus cayennensis (Buquet, 1835)
- Stenognathus chaudoiri Ball, 1975 (Nicaragua, Panama, Mexico)
- Stenognathus crassus Chaudoir, 1870 (Brazil)
- Stenognathus crenulatus Chaudoir, 1870 (Colombia, Brazil)
- Stenognathus dentifemoratus Shpeley & Ball, 2000 (Colombia)
- Stenognathus dentifer (Chaudoir, 1870) (Colombia)
- Stenognathus gagatinus (Dejean, 1831) (Brazil)
- Stenognathus jauja Shpeley & Ball, 2000 (Peru)
- Stenognathus longipennis Chaudoir, 1877 (Colombia)
- Stenognathus luctuosus (Maindron, 1906) (Brazil)
- Stenognathus melanarius (Dejean, 1831) (Brazil)
- Stenognathus nigropiceus (Bates, 1869) (Brazil)
- Stenognathus onorei Shpeley & Ball, 2000 (Ecuador)
- Stenognathus platypterus Chaudoir, 1870 (Colombia)
- Stenognathus plaumanni Shpeley & Ball, 2000 (Brazil)
- Stenognathus procerus (Putzeys, 1878) (Colombia)
- Stenognathus quadricollis Chaudoir, 1870 (Panama, Guatemala, Mexico)
- Stenognathus robustus (Bates, 1884)
- Stenognathus stricticollis (Maindron, 1906) (Peru)
