= Deinodus =

Deinodus Temporal range: Eifelian

Scientific classification
- Kingdom: Animalia
- Phylum: Chordata
- Class: Placodermi
- Order: incertae sedis
- Genus: Deinodus

Type species
- Deinodus bennetti Hussakof and Bryant 1919

Species
- Deinodus bennetti; Deinodus ohioensis

Deinodus is a form genus that includes two species: the form found in the Onondaga Formation of western New York, Deinodus bennetti, and the form found in the Columbus and Limestone of central Ohio, Deinodus ohioensis. Both species are limited to the Eifelian age of the middle Devonian Period, which occurred 398-391 million years ago (Martin, 2002).

Denison (1978) postulates that the genus could be an arthrodire or ptyctodont, but places it in his "incertae sedis" section. Individual specimens tend to resemble the ptyctodonts from the same units and ptyctodonts from Australia, so Deinodus is most likely a ptyctodont. Specimens interpreted as lateral spines may show that Deinodus was a basal ptyctodont, not far removed from the petalichthyids (Martin, 2002).

Deinodus bennetti was first described in 1919 (Hussakof and Bryant). Specimens of Deinodus exhibit a variety of shapes, though most possess the characteristic large tubercles reported by Hussakof and Bryant (1918). Those specimens that do not possess tubercles resemble those that do possess tubercles. These tubercles are usually found on a margin, close to the widest point, and are different in appearance from those reported in other placoderms (Long, 1997).

The variety of shapes probably represents function rather than ontogeny. Specimens have been attributed to upper and lower dental plates, dorsal spines, trunk shield plates and lateral spines. Tubercles are found on all of these elements (Long, 1997; Martin, 2002).

Most specimens that are considered dental elements are still entombed in matrix, so it is difficult to determine the feeding strategy of the fish (Martin, 2002). Since most ptyctodonts are durophagous (Maisey, 1996), meaning that they ate organisms with hard shells or exoskeletons, it seems likely that Deinodus was too.

Deinodus ohioensis was a bit smaller than D. bennetti and preferred shallower water. D. ohioensis could have been a smaller species or juvenile D. bennetti using the Columbus sea as a nursery area (Martin, 2002).
