= Diadsomaspis =

Diadsomaspis Temporal range: Late Devonian

Scientific classification
- Kingdom: Animalia
- Phylum: Chordata
- Class: †Placodermi
- Order: †Arthrodira
- Family: †Phlyctaeniidae
- Genus: †Diadsomaspis; Gross, 1937

Genus of placoderm fishes

Diadsomaspis is an extinct genus of placoderm fish, which lived during the Late Devonian period in Europe.
