= Heterogaspis =

Heterogaspis Temporal range: Late Devonian

Scientific classification
- Kingdom: Animalia
- Phylum: Chordata
- Class: †Placodermi
- Order: †Arthrodira
- Family: †Phlyctaeniidae
- Genus: †Heterogaspis; Strand, 1932

Species
- H. acuticornis; H. giganteus; H. minutus

Heterogaspis is an extinct genus of placoderm that lived during the Late Devonian period of Spitsbergen, Norway.
