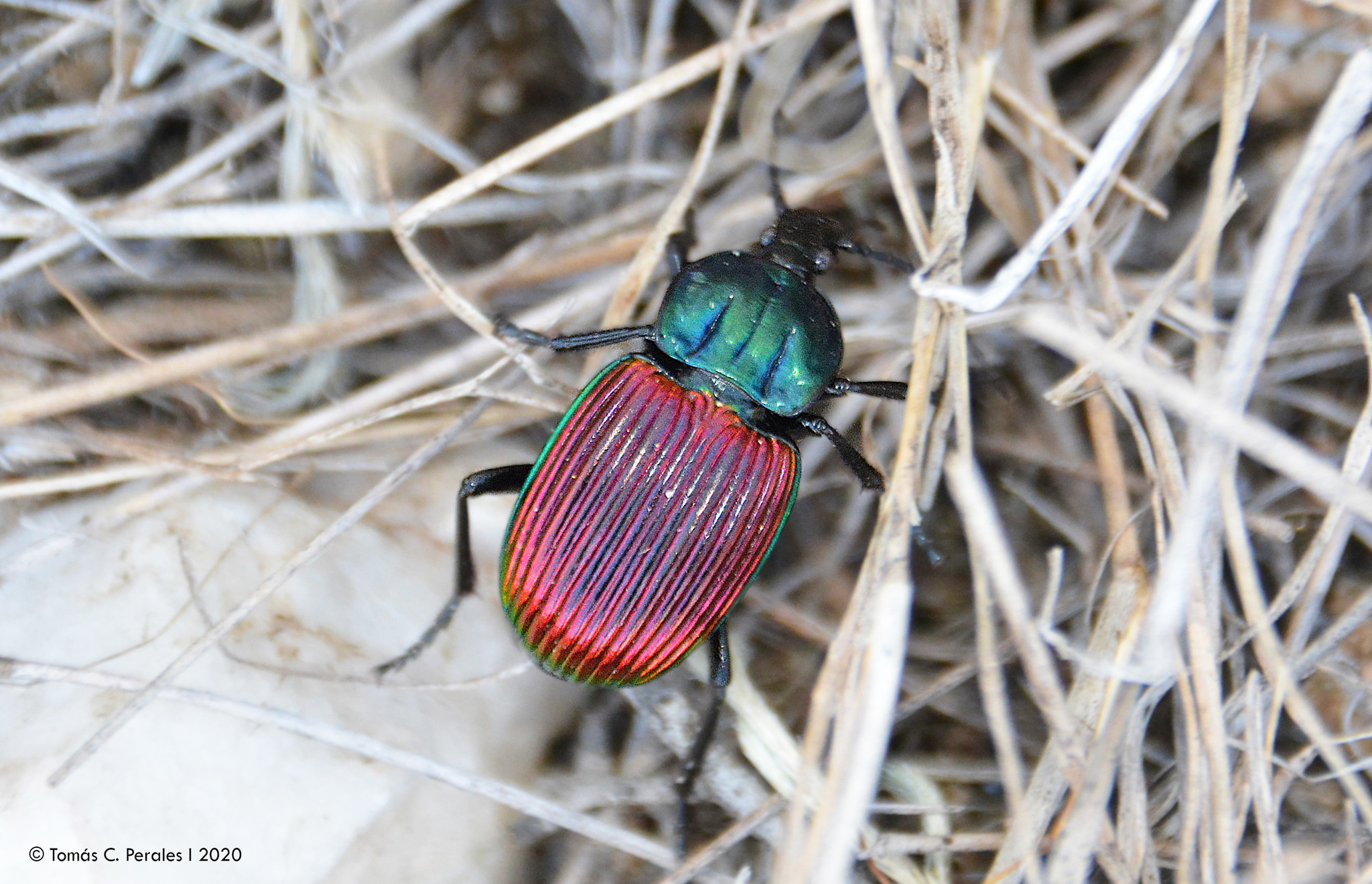
- Brachygnathus festivus, Argentina

Scientific classification
- Domain: Eukaryota
- Kingdom: Animalia
- Phylum: Arthropoda
- Class: Insecta
- Order: Coleoptera
- Suborder: Adephaga
- Family: Carabidae
- Subfamily: Panagaeinae
- Tribe: Brachygnathini
- Genus: Brachygnathus; Perty, 1830

= Brachygnathus =

Genus of beetles

Brachygnathus is a genus of ground beetles in the family Carabidae, the sole genus of the tribe Brachygnathini.

== Species ==
These seven species belong to the genus Brachygnathus:

- Brachygnathus angusticollis (Burmeister, 1885) (Argentina, Brazil, and Paraguay)
- Brachygnathus fervidus (Burmeister, 1885) (Argentina)
- Brachygnathus festivus (Dejean, 1830) (Argentina, Brazil, and Paraguay)
- Brachygnathus imperialis (Chaudoir, 1863) (Brazil, Chile, and Paraguay)
- Brachygnathus intermedius Perty, 1830 (Brazil)
- Brachygnathus muticus Perty, 1830 (Argentina, Brazil, and Paraguay)
- Brachygnathus oxygonus Perty, 1830 (Brazil, Chile, and Paraguay)
