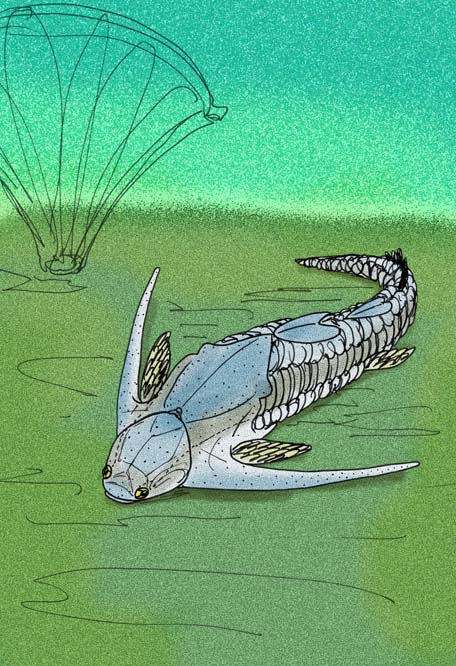

Scientific classification
- Kingdom: Animalia
- Phylum: Chordata
- Class: †Placodermi
- Order: †Arthrodira
- Family: †Phlyctaeniidae
- Genus: †Elegantaspis
- Species: †E. reticornis

Binomial name
- †Elegantaspis reticornis Heintz 1928

= Elegantaspis =

Elegantaspis Temporal range: 411.2–407 Ma Siegenian

Extinct genus of fishes

Elegantaspis reticornis is an arthrodire placoderm fish, which lived during the Early Devonian period in Spitsbergen, Norway.
