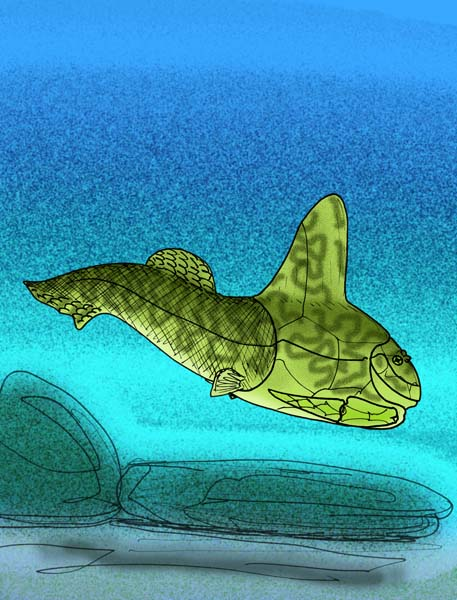
- Reconstruction of Grossaspis carinata

Scientific classification
- Kingdom: Animalia
- Phylum: Chordata
- Class: †Placodermi
- Order: †Antiarchi
- Family: †Pterichthyodidae
- Genus: †Grossaspis; White & Moy-Thomas, 1940
- Species: †G. carinata

Binomial name
- †Grossaspis carinata Schlüter, 1887

Synonyms
- Genus synonymy: Ceraspis Schlüter, 1887, non Lepeletier & Serville, 1825; Cornaspis Whitley, 1940; Species synonymy: Ceraspis hagenensis Schlüter, 1887

= Grossaspis =

Grossaspis Temporal range: Middle Devonian (Givetian)

Extinct genus of fishes

Grossaspis is a monotypic genus of antiarch placoderms known from the Givetian age of Eifel, Germany. It is represented by the single species, Grossaspis carinata. They were likely marine bottom feeders, characterized by a steep dorsal crest and a greatly inclined head.

== Description ==
The genus has attributed to it a few trunk shield plates, including material from the anterior median dorsal plate, posterior median dorsal plate, and anterior ventro-lateral plate. The length of the trunk shield was, dorsally, of c. 9 cm. The anterior median dorsal plate was characterized by a protruding, tall, laterally compressed crest that tapers posteriously and continuously onto the posterior median dorsal plate. Dorsal lateral line grooves were not found present. The anterior ventro-lateral plate presented a rather short subcephalic component, resulting in a steep inclination of the head forward. The bone’s spongiosa (the internal spongy, meshlike component of the bone) was thick, regular and prismatic.

== Paleobiology ==
Like many antiarchs, Grossaspis were likely bottom feeders. However, while most antiarchs predominantly inhabited freshwater lakes and streams, Grossaspis were adapted to marine environments. Other known marine antiarchs include Gerdalepis and Lepadolepis.
