= Prosphymaspis =

Prosphymaspis Temporal range: Late Devonian

Scientific classification
- Kingdom: Animalia
- Phylum: Chordata
- Class: †Placodermi
- Order: †Arthrodira
- Family: †Phlyctaeniidae
- Genus: †Prosphymaspis; Gross, 1937

Extinct genus of fishes

Prosphymaspis is an extinct genus of placoderm fish, which lived during the Late Devonian period of Europe.
