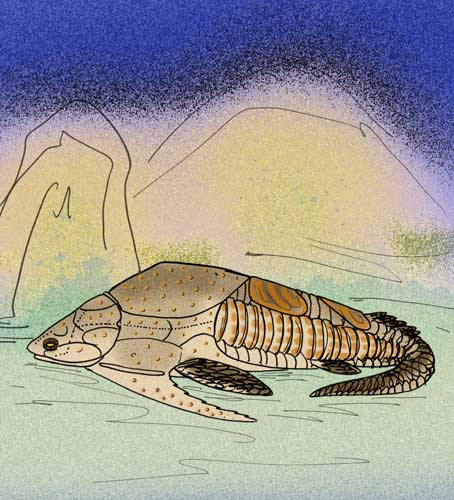
- An artist's representation of Aggeraspis heintzi

Scientific classification
- Kingdom: Animalia
- Phylum: Chordata
- Class: †Placodermi
- Order: †Arthrodira
- Family: †Phlyctaeniidae
- Genus: †Aggeraspis; Gross, 1962

Type species
- †Aggeraspis brevis Gross, 1933

= Aggeraspis =

Aggeraspis Temporal range: Early Devonian

Extinct genus of fishes

Aggeraspis is an extinct genus of arthrodire placoderm fish, which lived during the Early Devonian period in Europe.
