= Kueichowlepis =

Kueichowlepis Temporal range: Devonian

Scientific classification
- Kingdom: Animalia
- Phylum: Chordata
- Class: Placodermi
- Order: Arthrodira
- Family: Phlyctaeniidae
- Genus: Kueichowlepis Pan and Wang, 1975
- Species: K. sinensis

Binomial name
- Kueichowlepis sinensis

Extinct genus of placoderm

Kueichowlepis is an extinct genus of placoderm fish, which lived during the Devonian period of East Asia.
