= Arctaspis =

Arctaspis Temporal range: Devonian

Scientific classification
- Kingdom: Animalia
- Phylum: Chordata
- Class: †Placodermi
- Order: †Arthrodira
- Family: †Phlyctaeniidae
- Genus: †Arctaspis; Heintz, 1929

Species
- A. hoeli; A. kiaeri; A. maximus

Extinct genus of fishes

Arctaspis is an extinct genus of placoderm fish, which lived during the Devonian period in what is now Norway.
