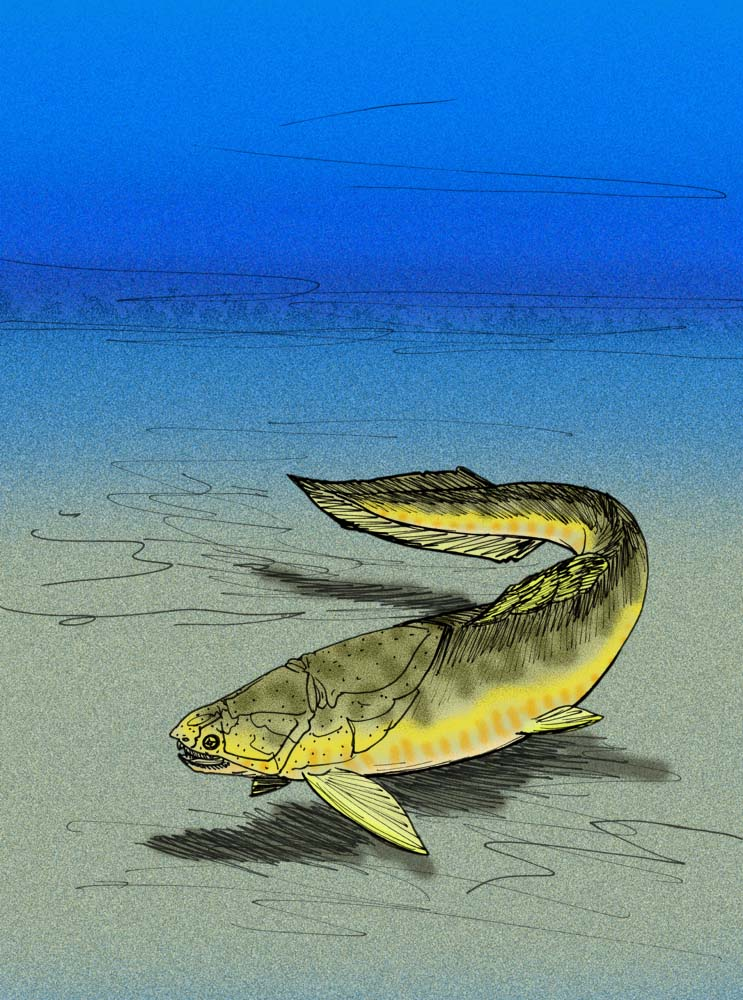
- Artist's reconstruction

Scientific classification
- Kingdom: Animalia
- Phylum: Chordata
- Class: †Placodermi
- Order: †Arthrodira
- Suborder: †Brachythoraci
- Family: †Coccosteidae
- Genus: †Jiuchengia; Wang & Wang, 1983
- Species: †J. longoccipita

Binomial name
- †Jiuchengia longoccipita Wang & Wang, 1983

= Jiuchengia =

Jiuchengia Temporal range: Late Emsian

Extinct genus of fishes

Jiuchengia longoccipita is a coccosteid arthrodire placoderm from the Late Emsian epoch of Wuding, Yunnan.

Its skull is similar in form to those of Watsonosteus and Dickosteus, though J. longoccipita can be easily distinguished from them in that its skull is longer, and has anatomical features in common with homostiids.
