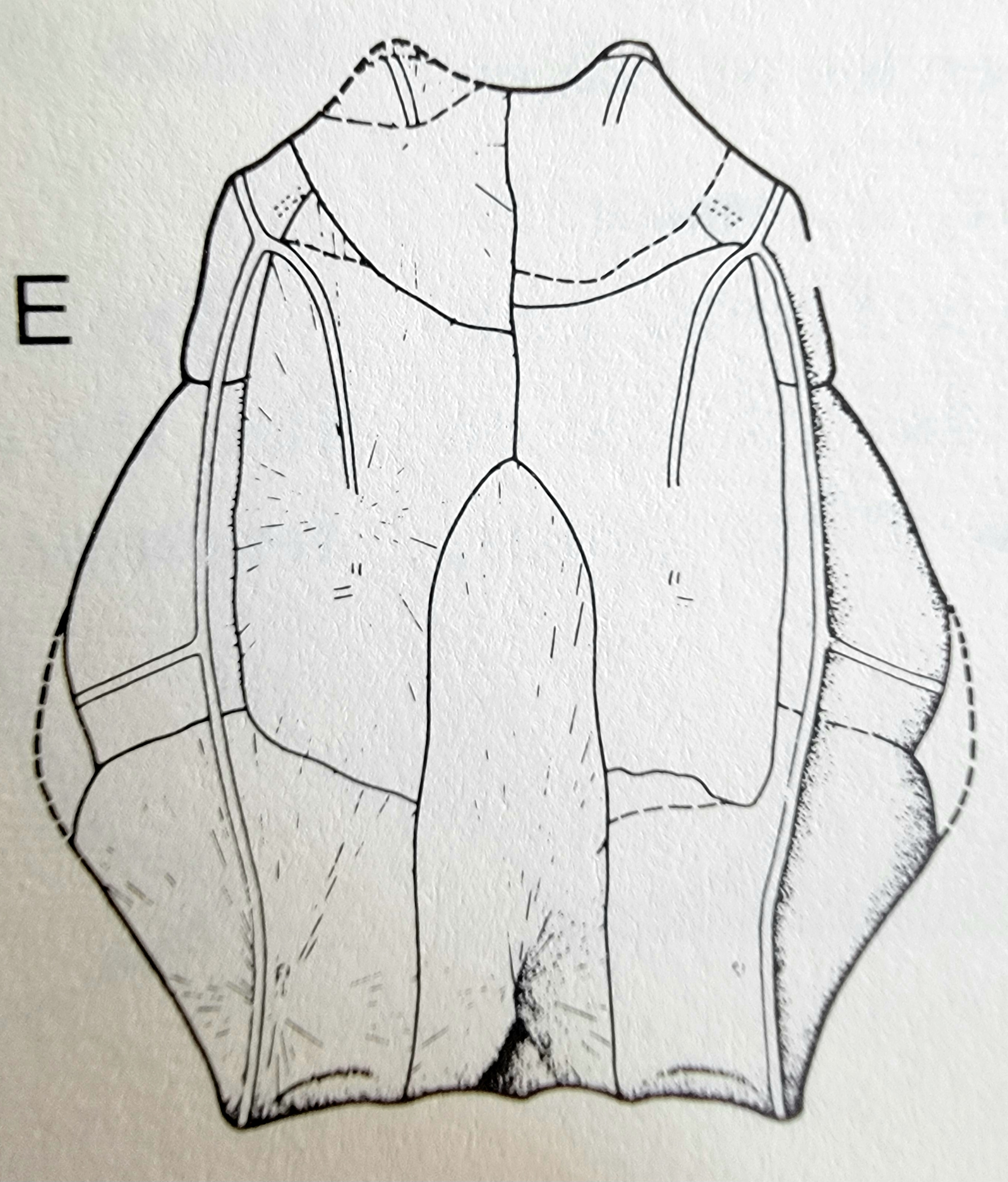
- Skull roof taken from Denison 1978.

Scientific classification
- Kingdom: Animalia
- Phylum: Chordata
- Class: †Placodermi
- Order: †Arthrodira
- Family: †Phlyctaeniidae
- Genus: †Pageauaspis; Denison, 1978
- Species: †P. russelli

Binomial name
- †Pageauaspis russelli Pageau, 1969

= Pageauaspis =

Pageauaspis Temporal range: Devonian

Genus of placoderm fishes

Pageauaspis is an extinct placoderm fish, which lived during the Devonian period of North America.
