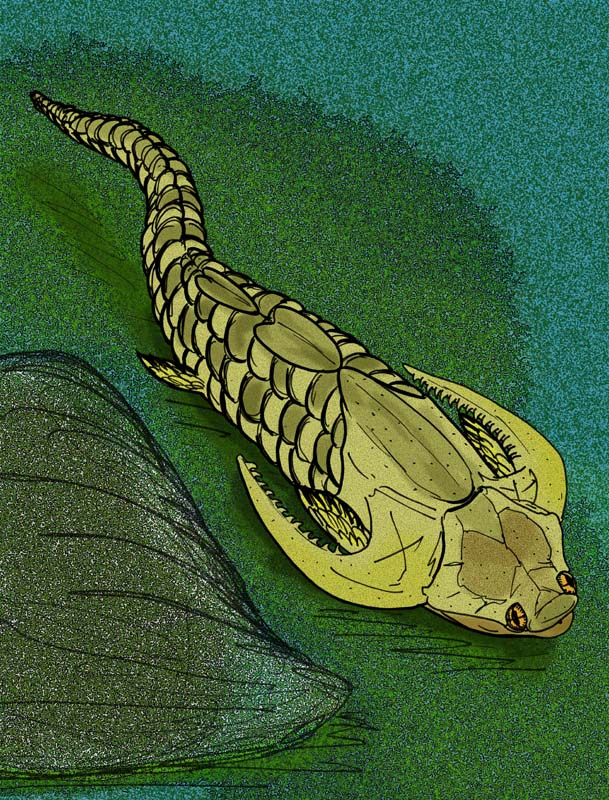

Scientific classification
- Kingdom: Animalia
- Phylum: Chordata
- Class: †Placodermi
- Order: †Arthrodira
- Family: †Phlyctaeniidae
- Genus: †Neophlyctaenius
- Species: †N. sherwoodi

Binomial name
- †Neophlyctaenius sherwoodi Denison, 1950

= Neophlyctaenius =

Neophlyctaenius Temporal range: Late Devonian

Extinct genus of fishes

Neophlyctaenius is an extinct genus of placoderm fish, which lived during the Late Devonian period of North America.
