= Lyhoalepis =

Lyhoalepis Temporal range: Emsian

Scientific classification
- Kingdom: Animalia
- Phylum: Chordata
- Class: †Placodermi
- Order: †Arthrodira
- Family: †Phlyctaeniidae
- Genus: †Lyhoalepis
- Species: †L. duckhoai

Binomial name
- †Lyhoalepis duckhoai Janvier, Tông-Dzuy & Doàn Nhât 1994

Genus of fishes (fossil)

Lyhoalepis duckhoai is an arthrodire placoderm fish, which lived during the Early Devonian period in what is now Central Vietnam. Its fossils are found in the Emsian-aged Ly Hoa Formation.
