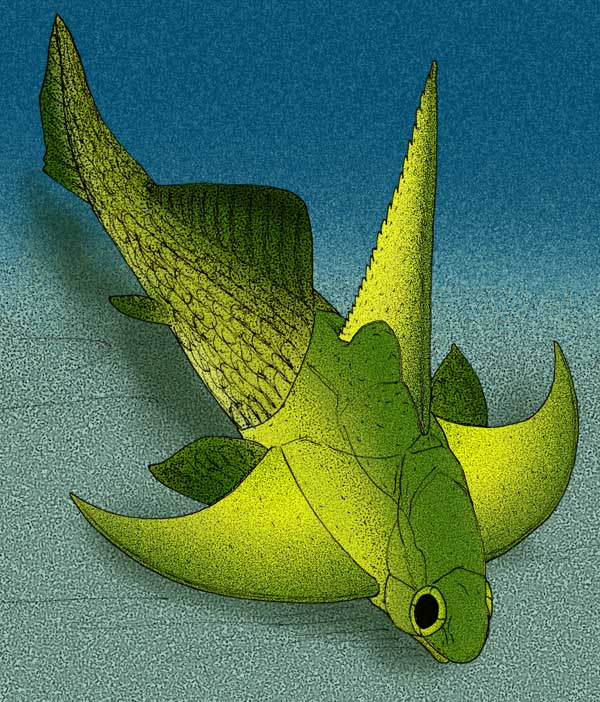
- Artist's reconstruction

Scientific classification
- Kingdom: Animalia
- Phylum: Chordata
- Class: †Placodermi
- Order: †Arthrodira
- Family: †Groenlandaspididae
- Genus: †Tiaraspis; Gross, 1962
- Species: †T. subtilis

Binomial name
- †Tiaraspis subtilis Gross, 1933

= Tiaraspis =

Tiaraspis Temporal range: Early Devonian (Siegenian - Early Emsian), 413.02–393.47 Ma

Extinct genus of fishes

Tiaraspis subtilis is the oldest known member of the arthrodire placoderm family Groenlandaspidae. Its fossils are found from Early Devonian Germany, ranging from the Pragian epoch until the Emsian.
