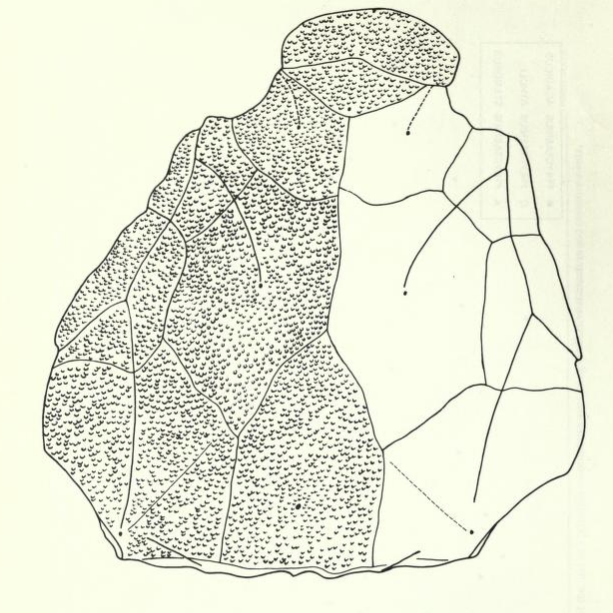
- Skull roof of P. acadius (specimen RSM GY 1897.51.129)

Scientific classification
- Kingdom: Animalia
- Phylum: Chordata
- Class: †Placodermi
- Order: †Arthrodira
- Family: †Phlyctaeniidae
- Genus: †Phlyctaenius; Traquair, 1890

Species
- †P. acadius Traquair, 1890; †P. australis Murray; †P. atholi Pageau, 1969; †P. stenosus Young, 1983

Synonyms
- Phlyctaenium Zittel, 1879 (preoccupied)

= Phlyctaenius =

Phlyctaenius Temporal range: Early Devonian–Middle Devonian

Genus of placoderm fishes

Phlyctaenius is an extinct genus of placoderm fish, which lived during the Devonian period of New Brunswick, Canada. It was named by Traquair (1890) as a replacement for Phlyctaenium Zittel (1879), which was preoccupied.

One species, P. anglicus, was known from remains found in England and Wales and was initially described by Traquair (1890). It was moved to Heightingtonaspis when the genus was described by White (1969).
