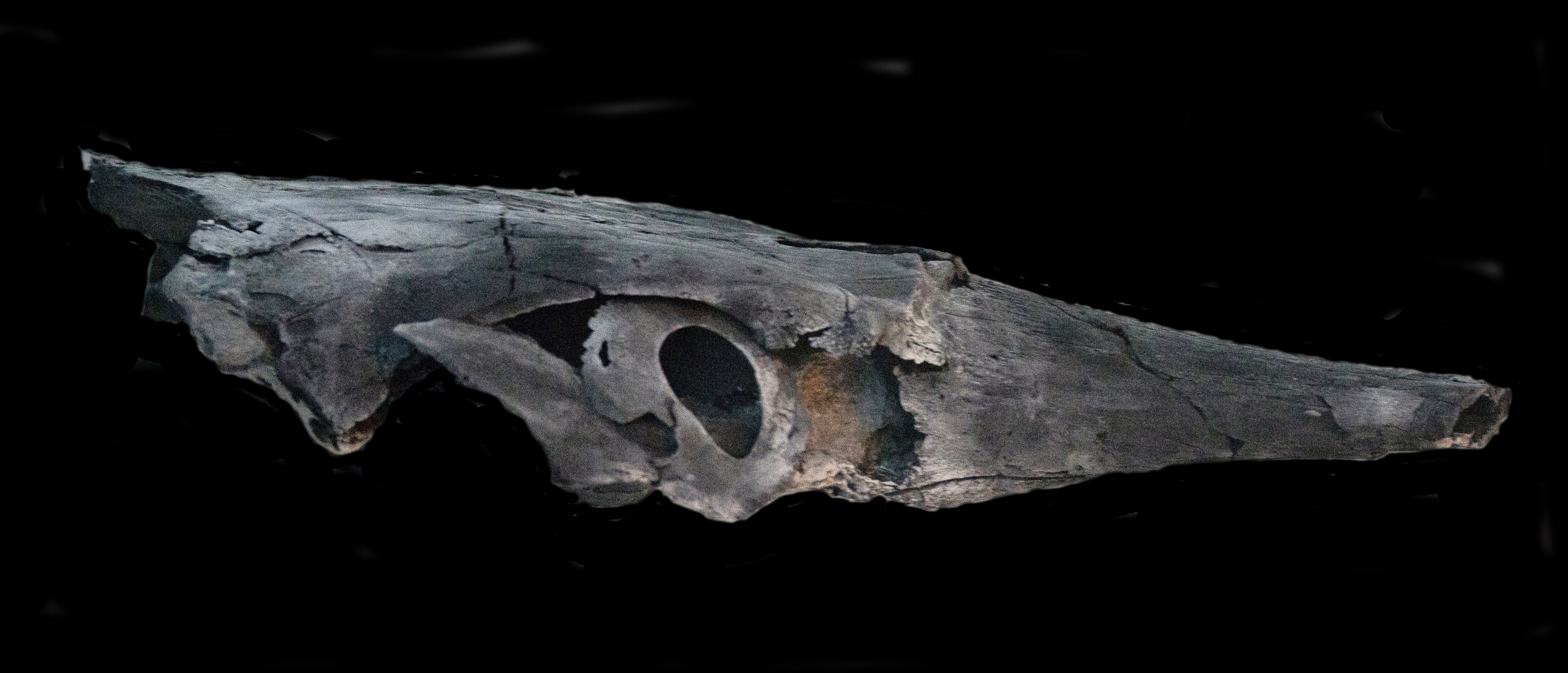
- Fossil material
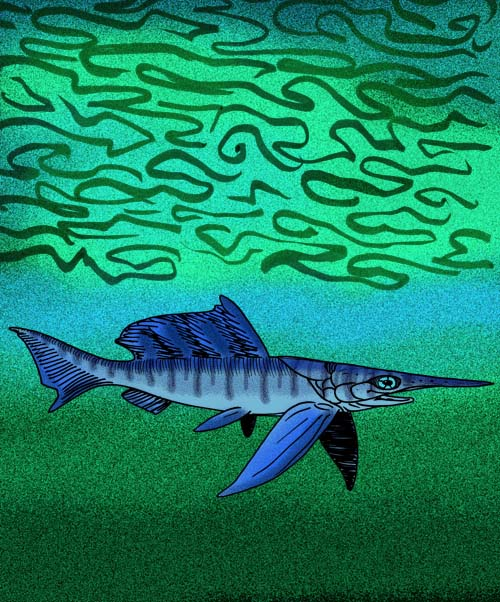
- Artist's reconstruction

Scientific classification
- Kingdom: Animalia
- Phylum: Chordata
- Class: †Placodermi
- Order: †Arthrodira
- Family: †incertae sedis
- Genus: †Carolowilhelmina
- Species: †C. geognostica

Binomial name
- †Carolowilhelmina geognostica Mark-Kurik & Carls, 2002

= Carolowilhelmina =

Carolowilhelmina Temporal range: Late Eifelian

Carolowilhelmina geognostica is an extinct arthrodire placoderm fish that lived in the Late Eifelian epoch (of Middle Devonian) of Aragon, Spain. In life, C. geognostica was a long-snouted pelagic fish, superficially similar to the Australian Rolfosteus and the European Oxyosteus. It is currently known only from an incomplete cranium that is about 43 cm (17 in) long. The fossil material is housed in the Natural Sciences museum of the University of Zaragoza, Spain (Museo de ciencias Naturales de la Universidad de Zaragoza).

== Discovery ==
Initial fragments belonging to Carolowilhelmina were accidentally uncovered by paleontologist Peter Carls in April 1971, after breaking a limestone nodule in an attempt to obtain a Conodont sample. The following day, fellow paleontologist Otto H. Walliser identified the fragments as fish remains, as they had been washed clean by a creek below the section. The origin of the fragments, however, could not be identified, as a portion of the slope had slid down and covered it. This did prompt a search for fish remains elsewhere, resulting in the discovery of Grossius aragonensis. by 1986, the creek had eroded at the sediment, revealing part of the fossil's rostrum. The fossil was collected in 1993.

The genus is named after Carl and Wilhelm of Braunschweig, founders of the Technical University of Braunschweig, and was named on the university's 250th anniversary.

== Description ==
Carolowilhelmina is only known from a single, incomplete skull. However, what is present in the fossil is well preserved. Carolowilhelmina was large, as the skull alone could have reached over half a meter in length. The skull also possesses a long snout of an uncertain length, since most of it had eroded away before its discovery. The snout has several thornlike spines running down it laterally. The skull possesses no teeth, but instead has a unique spongy knob-like structure in the mouth. As with Rolfosteus, Carolowilhelmina possessed a long tubular rostral plate, with small postnasal plates and low inferognathal plates.

Taxonomically, Carolowilhelmina seems closer to camuropiscids than to brachyderoids and Maideria. However, the number of unique features seen in the skull, such as the spines, lack of teeth, and unique sensory line placement makes the familial placement of this genus unclear.

== Paleoecology ==
Living just before the Kačák Event, Carolowilhelmina inhabited an environment with a rapidly deepening Celtiberian sea alongside pelagic invertebrate fauna represented by dacryoconarids, bivalves, small brachiopods, and ammonoids. The abundance of invertebrates in the region can infer the presence of floating algae, which may have also contributed to the abundance of organic matter preserved in the anoxic sediment. Other fish like Grossius, and the conodont Tortodus kocklianus were present in this environment.

Carolowilhelmina thus inhabited a pelagic, open ocean environment, and when it died had sunk into an anoxic deep sea environment where it was untouched by boring or encrusting organisms. It is inferred to have preyed on the abundance of invertebrate life beneath the algal floats near the surface, using its large eyes to spot prey. It possibly immigrated from the Paleo-Tethys Ocean.

== Sources ==
- Mark-Kurik, E & Carls, P. 2002. A Long-snouted Late Eifelian Arthrodire from Aragón (Spain). Revista Española de Paleontología, Madrid, pp. 117–135.
