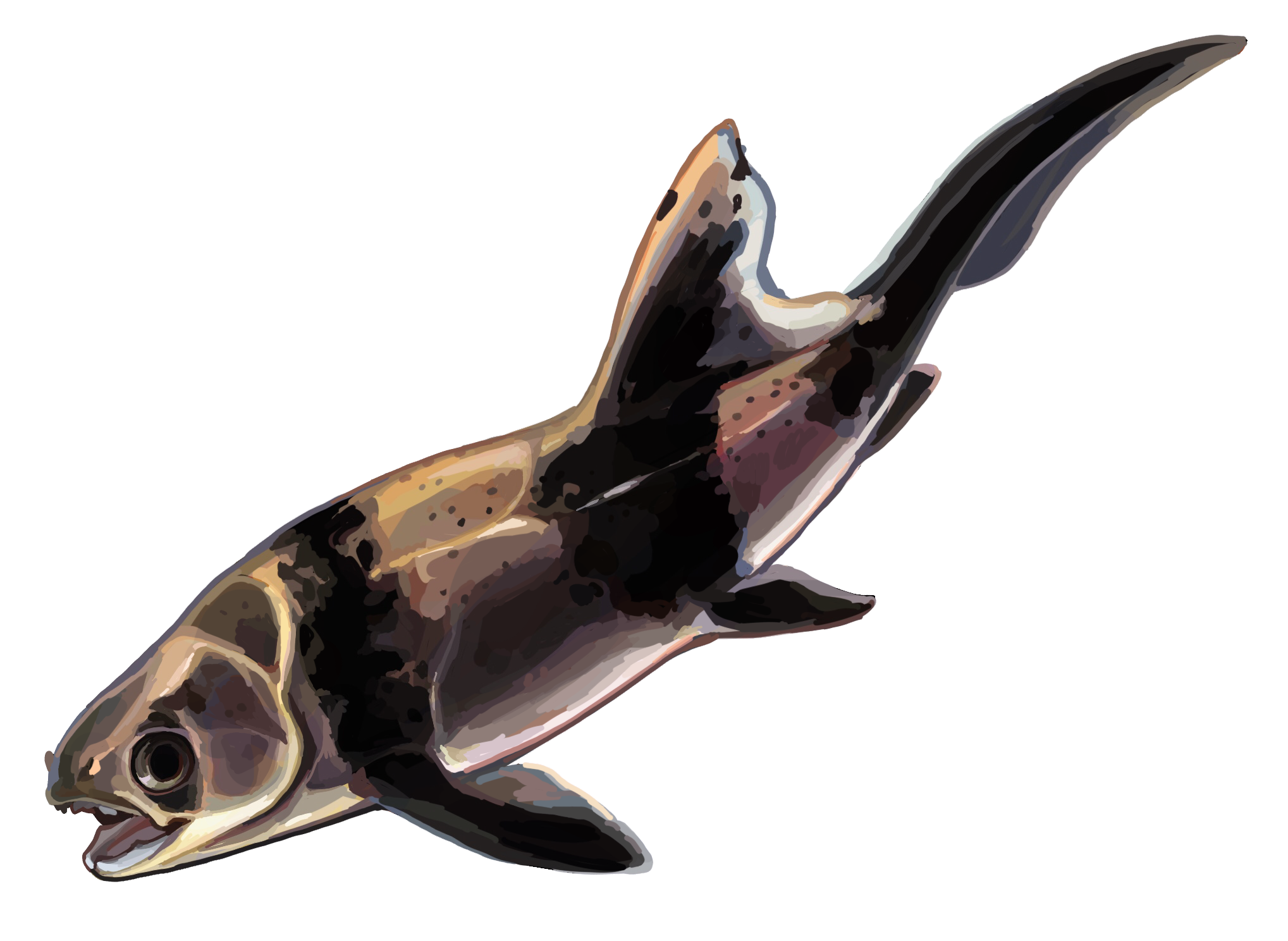
- Artist's reconstruction of Coccosteus cuspidatus

Scientific classification
- Kingdom: Animalia
- Phylum: Chordata
- Class: †Placodermi
- Order: †Arthrodira
- Suborder: †Brachythoraci
- Infraorder: †Coccosteina; Heintz, 1932

Superfamilies
- See text

= Coccosteina =

Coccosteina Temporal range: Devonian

Extinct order of fishes

Coccosteina is an extinct infraorder of placoderms, armored fish most diverse during the Devonian. However, the term is no longer in use, as modern cladistical methods have produced alternative phylogenetic trees of Brachythoraci with new subdivisions.

== Systematics ==
- Basal genus Maideria
- Basal genus Xiangshuiosteus
- Superfamily Buchanosteoidea
  - Family Buchanosteidae
- Superfamily Gemuendenaspoidea
  - Family Gemuendenaspidae
- Superfamily Homosteoidea
  - Family Homostiidae
- Superfamily Brachydeiroidea
  - Family Brachydeiridae
  - Family Leptosteidae
- Superfamily Coccosteoidea
  - Family Pholidosteidae
  - Family Coccosteidae
  - Family Plourdosteidae
  - Family Torosteidae
  - Family Incisoscutidae
  - Family Camuropiscidae
- Superfamily Dinichthyloidea
  - Family Hadrosteidae
  - Family Dinichthyidae
  - Family Trematosteidae
  - Family Rhachiosteidae
  - Family Titanichthyidae
  - Family Bungartiidae
  - Family Selenosteidae
  - Family Mylostomatidae
