= Termier =

Termier is a surname. Notable people with the surname include:

- Geneviève Termier (1917–2005), French paleontologist and evolutionist
- Henri Termier (1897–1989), French geologist
- Pierre-Marie Termier (1859–1930), French geologist
