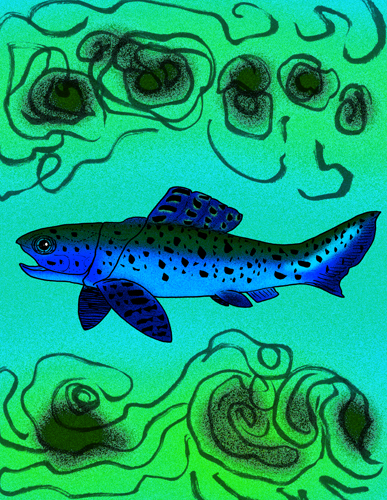
- Restoration of B. grandis

Scientific classification
- Kingdom: Animalia
- Phylum: Chordata
- Class: †Placodermi
- Order: †Arthrodira
- Suborder: †Brachythoraci
- Infraorder: †Coccosteina
- Superfamily: †Brachydeiroidea; Denison, 1978

Type species
- Brachydeirus carinatus Gross, 1932

Families
- Brachydeiridae; Leptosteidae

= Brachydeiroidea =

Brachydeiroidea Temporal range: Middle to Late Frasnian

Extinct superfamily of fishes

Brachydeiroidea is a superfamily of small to moderately large-sized arthrodire placoderms from the Late Devonian of Europe and Eastern North America.

Brachydeiroids have, in cross section, a highly compressed body, a pointed, sometimes highly elongated snout, and tremendous orbits. The plates of the trunk shield are noticeably shortened: in Synauchenia, the trunk shield and head shield are fused together as a single, immovable unit. The superficial anatomy of brachydeiroids is extremely diverse.

== Families ==
=== Brachydeiridae ===
A diverse family of variable forms, restricted to the middle to late Frasnian of Europe.

=== Leptosteidae ===
This family is represented by two species in the genus Leptosteus. Leptosteids differ from brachydeirids by having comparatively smaller orbits and more elongated trunk shields.

== See also ==
- List of placoderms
