= Candeal bread =

Spanish white bread

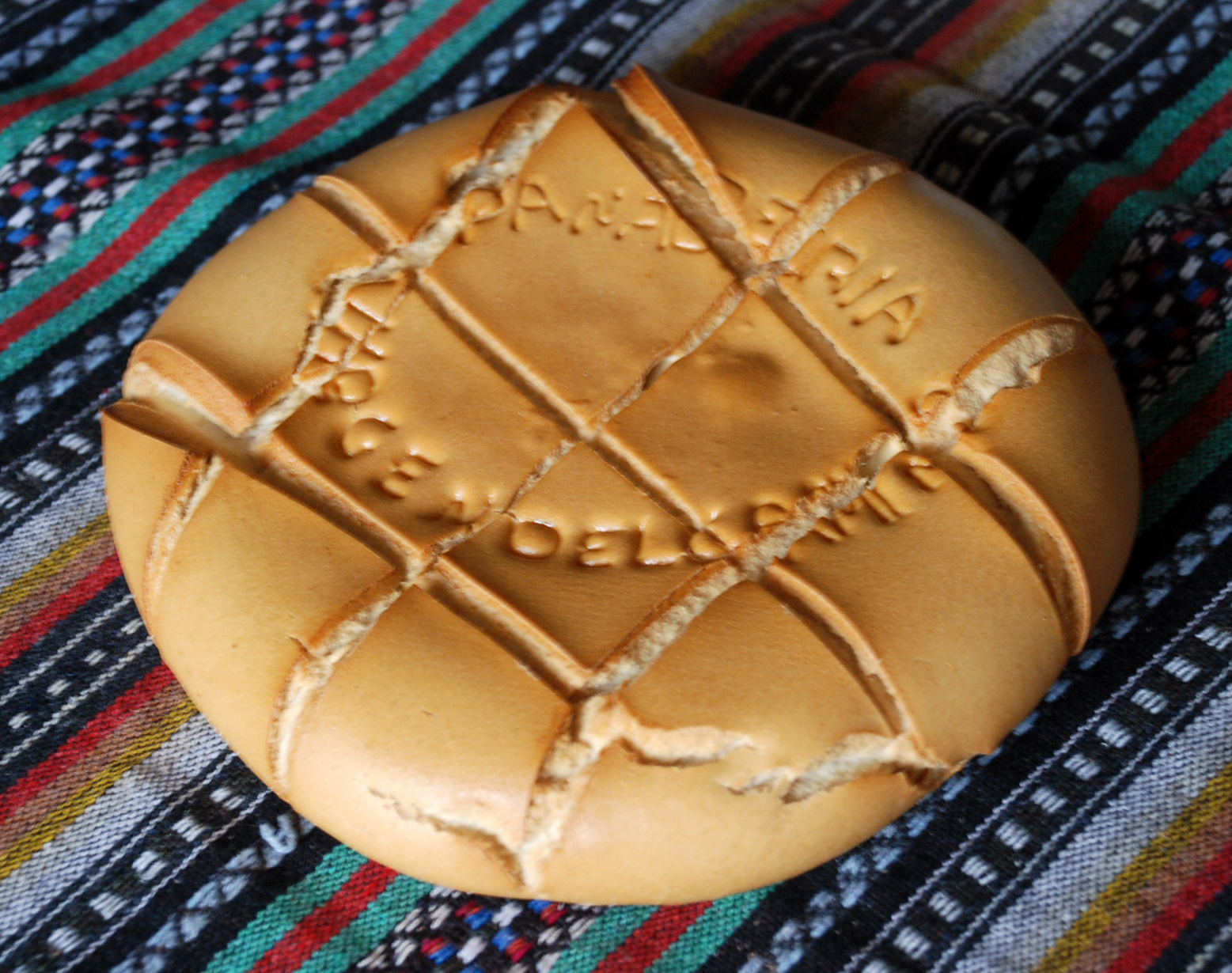
Pan bregao from Castrillo de Villavega (province of Palencia)

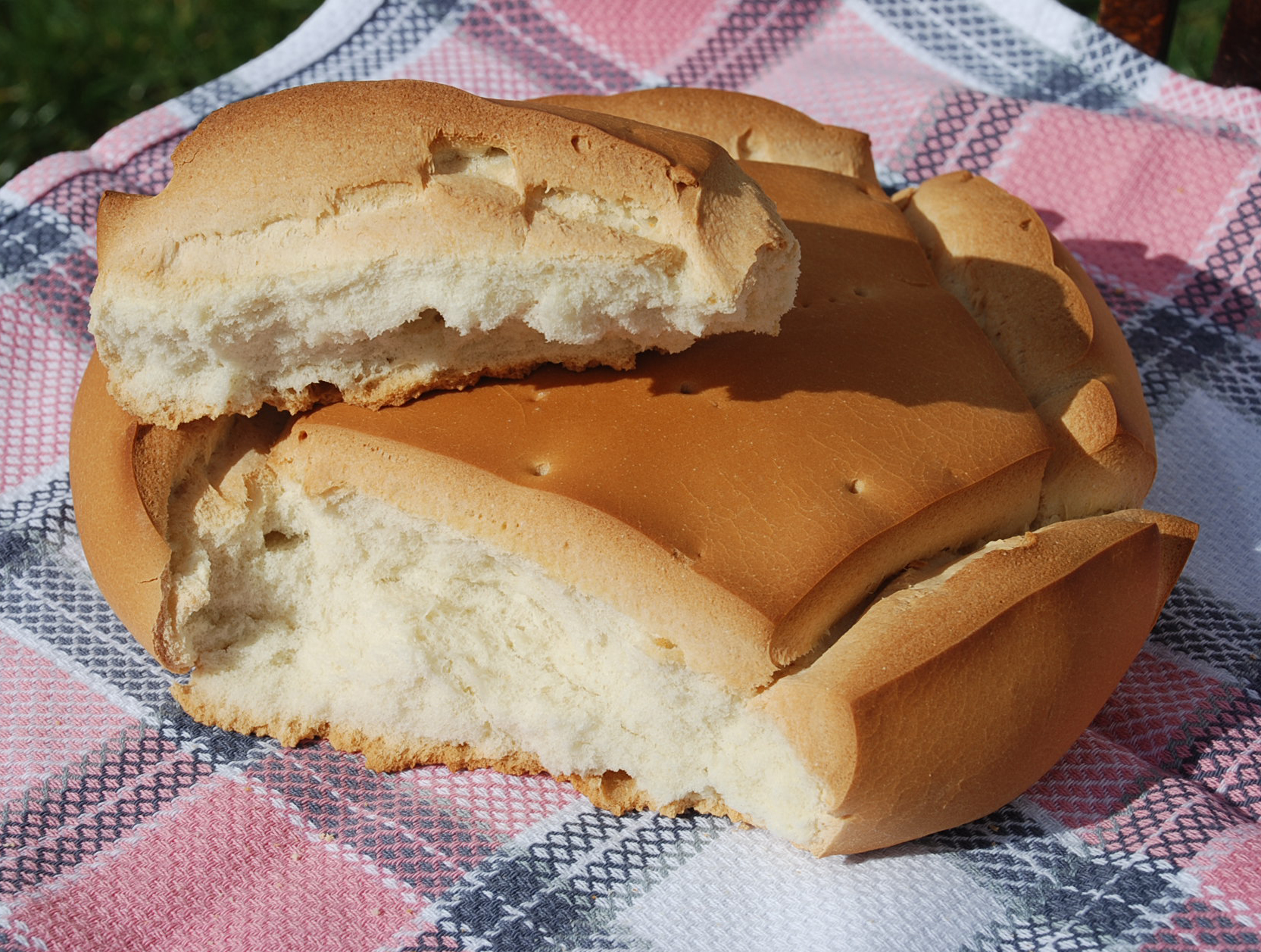
The defining characteristic of candeal bread is its dense, close-textured crumb

Candeal bread (Spanish: pan candeal [kandeˈal]), also known as sobado or bregado, is a type of white bread characterized by low hydration, a dense texture, and long shelf life. Its preparation differs from other breads due to a single fermentation and a process of dough sheeting (refinado), which compacts and hardens the dough. In this sense, it is the opposite of flama breads (pan de flama) or soft dough bread (common breads). Candeal bread has a dense, tight crumb with no pores and a crispy crust with a very smooth, golden surface. It often features scorings (cuts) in geometric patterns. Candeal bread is sold in various shapes, including round loaves, bars, squares, rings, spikes, and braids. Traditionally, it was made with durum wheat flour, which has less strength – gluten – than conventional flour but a higher protein content.

Due to its aroma, flavor, and history, candeal bread is considered an emblem of traditional Spanish bread culture. It originated in what is now the Castile and León region, where variations such as the libreta, hogaza, cuartal, lechuguino, rosca, and fabiola are found. The tradition spread to other parts of the Iberian Peninsula, leading to variations such as the telera from Córdoba, the bollo from Seville, the pan de la Mota and pan de Cruz from La Mancha, the pan sobao from La Rioja and Alava, the cornecho from Galicia, and the bisaltos from Aragón. It is often referred to as the "childhood bread" of many Spaniards. However, its consumption has significantly declined in recent years due to its low profitability and complex preparation.

== Names ==
This type of bread has multiple regional names:

- Pan candeal or pan blanco ('white bread'). Named after the type of flour used, from candeal wheat. The term candeal comes from cande, an archaic word for the white color (from Latin candĭdus, meaning 'bright white, pure white').
- Bregado or sobado bread. These terms refer to the sheeting process the dough undergoes (refinado or la briega), between pre-kneading and subsequent fermentation.
- Pan de miga dura or de miga prieta ('dense-crumb bread'), technical term.
- Pan español, espanhol ('Spanish bread'). This name appears in medieval bread legislation, and it is also recognized in current legislation (Real Decreto 308/2019).
- Other names include pan de Castilla ('Castilian bread', referring to its geographic origin; pan hiñido – from heñir, meaning 'to knead the dough with fists' – in Aliste and the Tierra de Alba (Leonese Region); pan macerado in Zaragoza and other parts of Aragon; or also pa assaonat in the inland areas of the province of Valencia.

== History ==
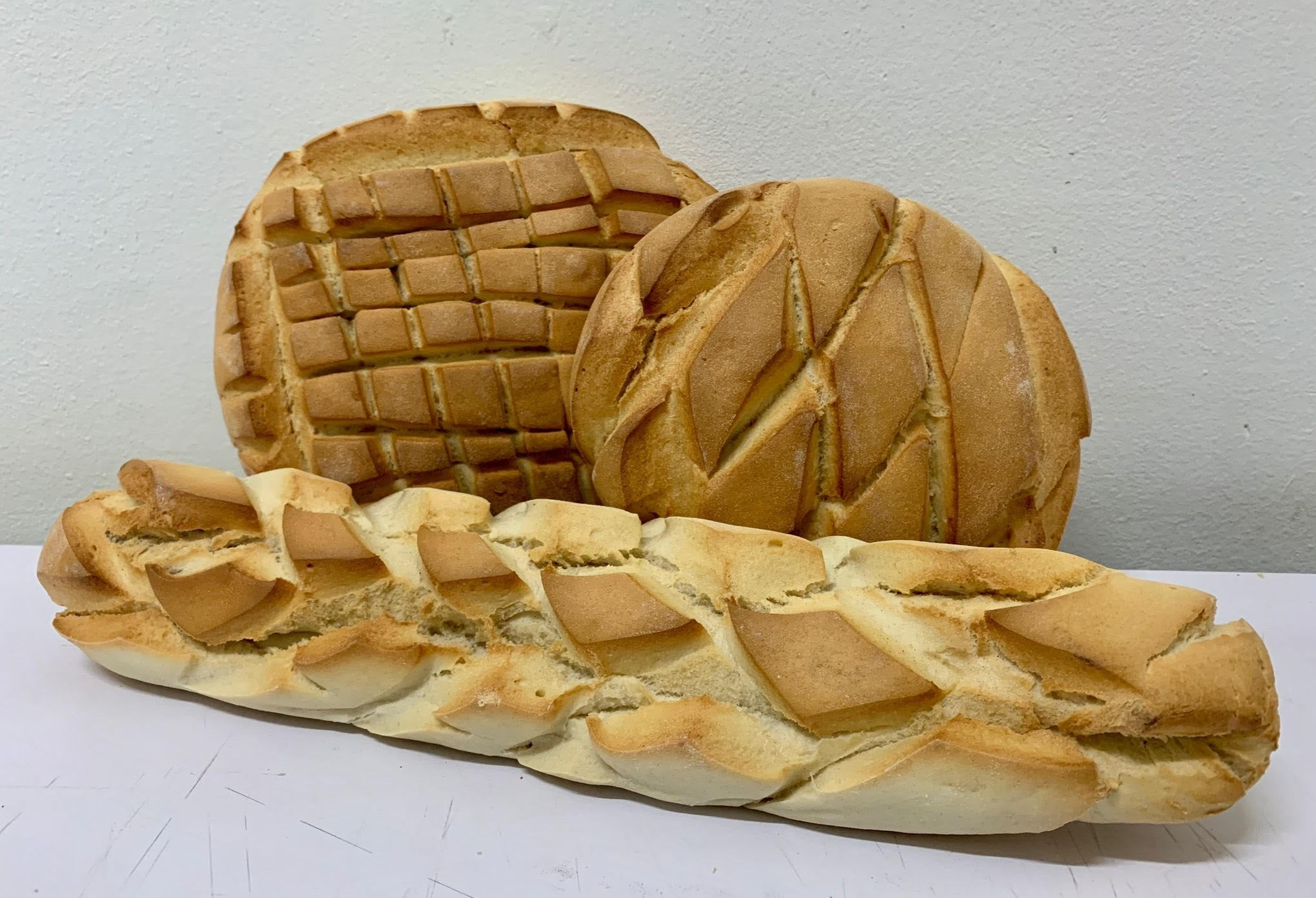
Hiñido breads from Zamora

Candeal bread, also known as "bregado" or "sobado," does not have a detailed written history, but it is linked to regions with good soft wheat and a milling tradition. Its origin is precisely in the Castilian Plateau, where the first records date back to the Middle Ages. From what is now Castilla y León, it was exported to the southern peninsula and to Portugal. Its production also spread to the Canary Islands. During the 16th and 17th centuries, Castilian bread, particularly the bread-making tradition of Valladolid, was highly appreciated and well-known. Candeal wheat was always a product reserved for the upper classes.

Candeal bread did not reach Andalusia until 1563, when the Fúcar family, royal treasurers of Philip II of Spain, paid the Valladolid baker Francisco Mateo to teach Andalusian bakers how to make the bregado bread. The recipe spread quickly, and candeal bread entered its golden age. Numerous writers from the Spanish Golden Age dedicated verses to candeal bread. The bread from Andalusia competed with that from Castile for the title of the most renowned.

Bregado bread was given to soldiers, as it has the exceptional feature of lasting for days, even weeks. In particular, loaves can easily last seven days, making them ideal for fieldwork and herding.

=== Candeal bread in Latin Europe ===
The most traditional candeal bread is found in the north of Portugal, where it is known by various names depending on the region: pão sovado, pão arregueifado, or pão espanhol. In the border areas of Beira Alta, it is called pão roda, while in the Lower Alentejo and Algarve, it is known as pão de calo. It is an ancient Portuguese bread with low hydration and a crumb that is worked thoroughly with a rolling pin. Due to its long shelf life, ship crews used it as a substitute for biscoitos or biscoitos de bordo (hardtacks). A Portuguese type of candeal bread is the regueifa, used in pilgrimages, and there are also other formats such as regueifinha, redondo, bica, or cacete, which is the loaf.

Candeal bread reached Normandy in France through the Kingdom of Navarre during the time of Charles II 'The Bad', who married the French Joan of Valois. This led to the creation of the so-called Norman pain brié (also pain de chapître, or 'chapter bread'), which is very similar to candeal. Spanish tercios brought candeal bread to France, Italy, Flanders, and other parts of Europe. Even in the Maghreb, there is a bread derived from candeal known as pain espagnol. In Italy, candeal bread is known as pane di pasta dura or also as pane gramolato, as it is made using the gramolatrice (gramola). Some pani di pasta dura include coppia ferrarese, barilino, grissia monferrina, and baule mantovano, all of which are northern Italian breads with distinctive twisted shapes. On the island of Sardinia, a candeal bread is coccoi a pitzus, lavishly decorated for weddings and other events. However, the strongest candeal tradition is found in the Hyblaean Mountains of southern Sicily, particularly in the towns of Ragusa and Modica, where these breads are called u pani ri casa and come in various forms: u pistolu, rugnuni, cucchia, etc. Some of these Sicilian breads have a votive function, such as cucciddatu di Carrozza.

Candeal bread can serve decorative or ceremonial functions.

=== Disappearance ===
Once considered by many as "the bread of their childhood," candeal bread has drastically disappeared from Spanish bakeries. This is primarily due to the cost of raw materials, as it requires more flour than water, and specifically candeal-type flour. In January 2021, José Carlos Capel explained in El País, in an article titled "Save the Candeal Bread," that candeal wheat is hardly planted anymore due to its low profitability for farmers.

According to Ibán Yarza, "Candeal bread is a relic sentenced to death (...) it is a treasure that the new generations do not understand, and it is not even valued in certain gastronomic circles."

== Candeal flour ==
Candeal bread was traditionally made with flour from the candeal wheat (Triticum turgidum var. durum L.), which has a high protein content and less gluten than the wheat that is commercially available today, and its flour is less strong than conventional flour. Candeal wheat is considered a high-quality variety that only the upper class could afford. Candeal varieties of common wheat (Triticum aestivum) are also described. If candeal flour is unavailable, a more basic, white, medium-high strength flour suitable for baking can be used.

Due to the properties of candeal flour, it is reserved exclusively for candeal bread. However, candeal wheat is becoming less commonly grown, making it difficult to make the original candeal bread recipe. "At this point, candeal bread shouldn't even be called that. Candeal wheat is barely grown due to the low profitability it provides to farmers; we should call it 'bregado bread'," said Joaquín Marcos, president of the Panaderos de Salamanca association (aespan) and owner of the Pan Arapiles bakery, which was awarded in 2019 as "the bakery with the best candeal bread in Spain." Bartolomé Méndez, miller and owner of the Molino Eco-Coín, says "subsidies were largely to blame for its disappearance. Foreign wheat varieties were prioritized, and local varieties were abandoned."

== Preparation ==
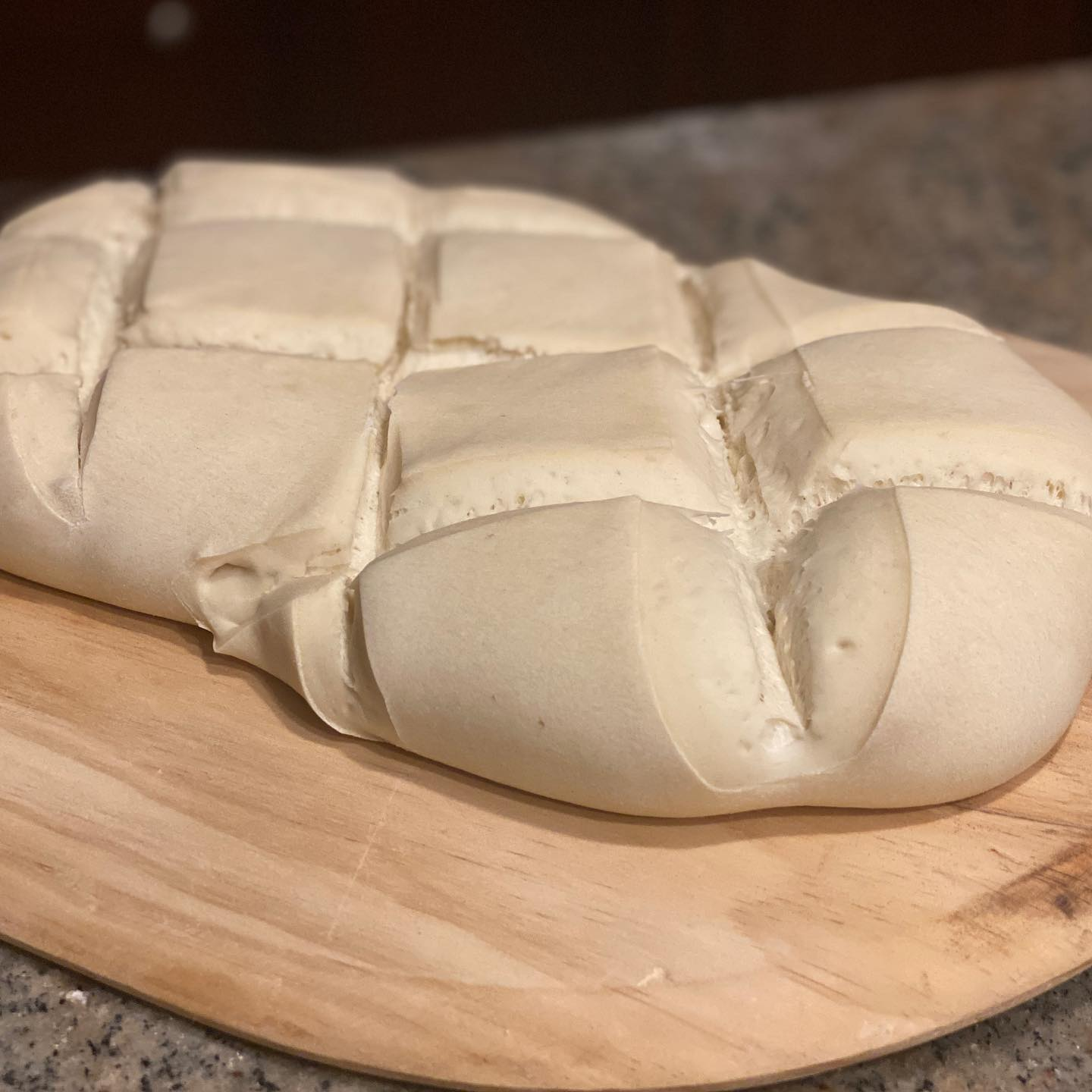
Candeal dough rising.

The preparation is different from that of common bread and does not allow for the complete mechanization of the process, and in fact, its production is mainly artisanal. The preparation is considered difficult for novice bakers.

The flour is mixed with very cold water to form the dough in a 40-45% water-to-flour ratio. For this reason, it is considered a low-hydration bread. A preferment such as biga can be added.

=== Sheeting ===
The main difference of this bread is that it is not kneaded, but rather sheeted. It is also called working or massaging the dough. Sheeting (called refinado in Spanish, ‘refining’) is a technique that consists of stretching and folding the dough several times using a rolling pin or a cylinder machine (breguil). In this way, its components are compressed or pressed as the dough expels the gas particles. The process can be extended for 15–20 minutes, which requires intense physical force. It is known when the dough starts to "make little farts", meaning it expels the gas bubbles. This results in a silky, very smooth, and cohesive dough with a texture similar to clay.

=== Scoring and Shaping ===
Low-hydration breads require deeper cuts to allow better evaporation during baking. It is common to score candeal bread with various patterns, and even give it curious shapes like the coppia, because the hardness of the dough allows great malleability. For this reason, it is also often stamped with stamps or seals. The dough is often pierced several times with a dough pricker or skewer, which helps with baking. This process should be done immediately after refining, before the dough begins to ferment.

Ideas for scoring a candeal loaf.

=== Proofing ===
Unlike other breads, candeal bread is fermented only once, never twice. This prevents the development of air pockets in the crumb; the goal is to achieve a compact crumb. To proof it, the dough is covered and left to ferment for just under an hour, depending on the weight and ambient temperature.

=== Baking ===
It is baked at around 200 °C for 30 to 40 minutes, depending on the bread(s) weight.

== Candeal bread in culture ==
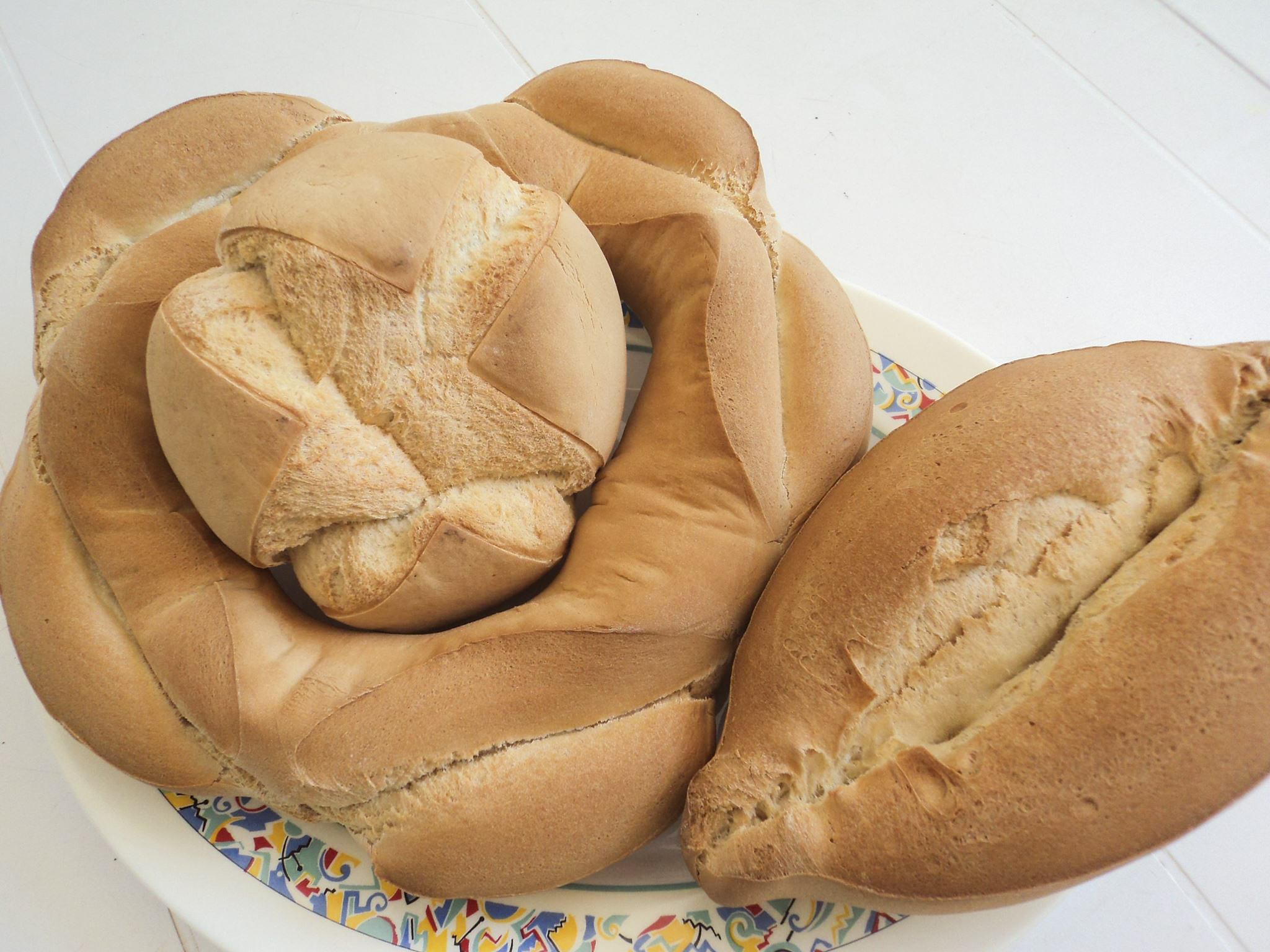
Pan de Cruz from Ciudad Real

The Spanish proverb says:

"Pan de centeno, para su enemigo es bueno;
pan de mijo, no se lo des a tu hijo;
pan de cebada, comida de asno disimulada;
pan de panizo, fue el diablo el que lo hizo;
pan de trigo candeal o tremés, lo hizo Dios y mi pan es"

— collected by Juan Cruz Cruz, in Medieval Dietetics. La Val de Onsera, 1997, pp. 62-63.

In general, records, as well as proverbs, tend to praise the virtues of this bread. For example, a popular saying goes: pan candeal, ¡pan celestial! ("Candeal bread, heavenly bread!") Other sayings are: pan candeal, no hay otro tal ("Candeal bread, there is no other like it"), pan candeal y vino tintillo ponen al hombre gordillo ("Candeal bread and red wine make a man grow fat"), qué bien, qué mal, pan candeal y vino de Madrigal ("How well, how bad, candeal bread and wine from Madrigal").

These types of bread have been documented since the Spanish imperial era. The pan de cruz is mentioned in Chapter VI of the first part of Don Quixote. Additionally, Lope de Vega, Tirso de Molina, and other literary authors of the Spanish Golden Age honored pan candeal in their writings.

Pan de Gandul de mi vida, roscas de Utrera del cielo

— Lope de Vega

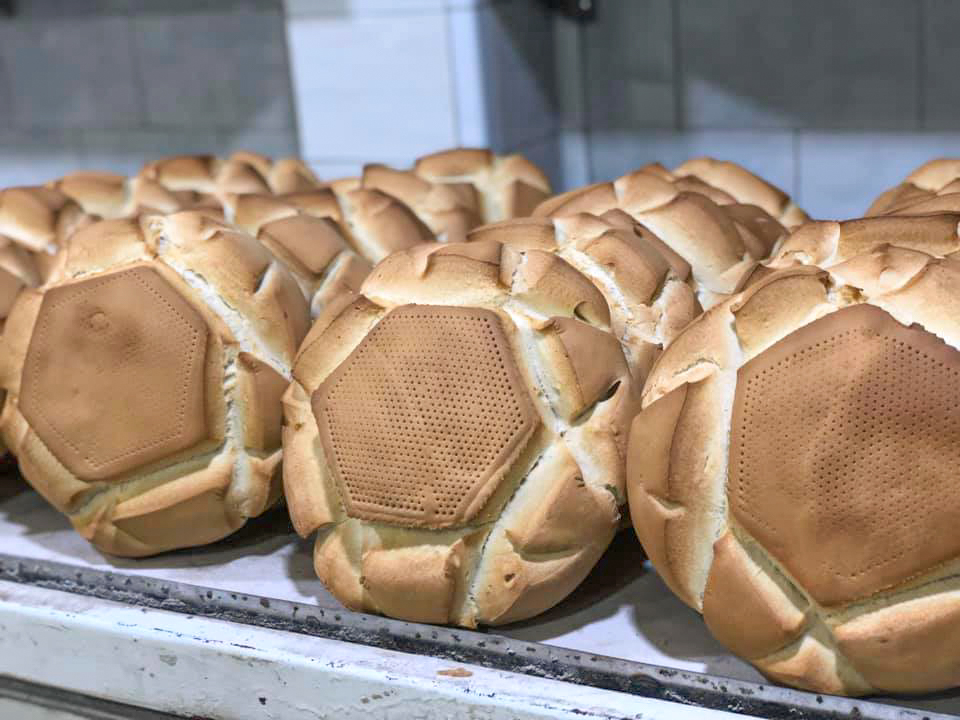
Candeal bread in Cazorla, Andalusia

== Culinary use ==
- It is mainly used to accompany meals and make bocadillos (sandwiches).
- Due to its high absorption crumb, it is ideal for dipping into stews, fried foods, soups, and in the yolk of fried eggs.
- In Andalusia, candeal breads are used to make the typical Andalusian breakfast of bread soaked in olive oil and sugar.
- In Córdoba, telera or other candeal breads that are already staled are used to make salmorejo.
- In Castile, candeal bread accompanies traditional roasted meats from the region, such as lamb and hearty soups.
- Castilian soup, which is a garlic soup, is made with old candeal bread.

== See also ==
- Bread culture in Spain

Other breads in Spain:

- Cañada bread
- Galician bread
- Bread of Alfacar
- Regañao

== Bibliography ==
- Capel, José Carlos (1994). La tradición del pan artesanal en España [The Tradition of Artisan Bread in Spain] (in Spanish) (1st ed.). Àmbit Servicios Editoriales. ISBN 84-87342-23-X. OCLC 32970683.
- Yarza, Ibán (2019). 100 recetas de pan de pueblo: ideas y trucos para hacer en casa panes de toda España [100 Recipes for Village Bread: Ideas and Tips to Make Breads from All Over Spain at Home] (in Spanish) (1st ed.). Editorial Grijalbo. ISBN 978-84-17338-64-0. OCLC 1128195689.
- Gil Hernández, Ángel (2015). Libro blanco del pan [White Book of Bread] (in Spanish). Ed. Médica Panamericana. ISBN 978-84-98355-05-5.
