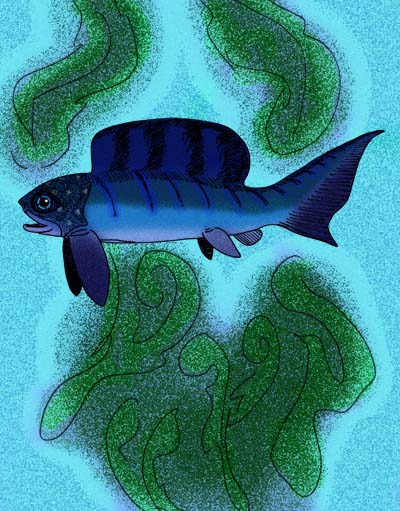
- Synauchenia coalescens

Scientific classification
- Kingdom: Animalia
- Phylum: Chordata
- Class: †Placodermi
- Order: †Arthrodira
- Suborder: †Brachythoraci
- Family: †Brachydeiridae
- Genus: †Synauchenia; Jaekel, 1919
- Species: †S. coalescens

Binomial name
- †Synauchenia coalescens Gross, 1932

Synonyms
- Synosteus Jaekel, 1926

= Synauchenia =

Synauchenia Temporal range: Late Frasnian

Extinct genus of fishes

Synauchenia coalescens is a trout-sized, highly compressed arthrodire placoderm restricted to the Late Frasnian-aged Kellwasserkalk Fauna of Bad Wildungen.

Synauchenia coalescens is unique among arthrodires in that the head shield and the trunk shield are fused or "firmly sutured" together in an immobile, helmet-like unit. The neck gap is absent, and the articulations between the cranium and thorax are lost in the evolution of this peculiar feature. The skull of the holotype is 10 cm long.

Synauchenia coalescens was originally placed in its own family, but, it was later determined to be closely related to Oxyosteus and Brachydeirus, and accordingly placed within Brachydeiridae.

== See also ==
- List of placoderms
