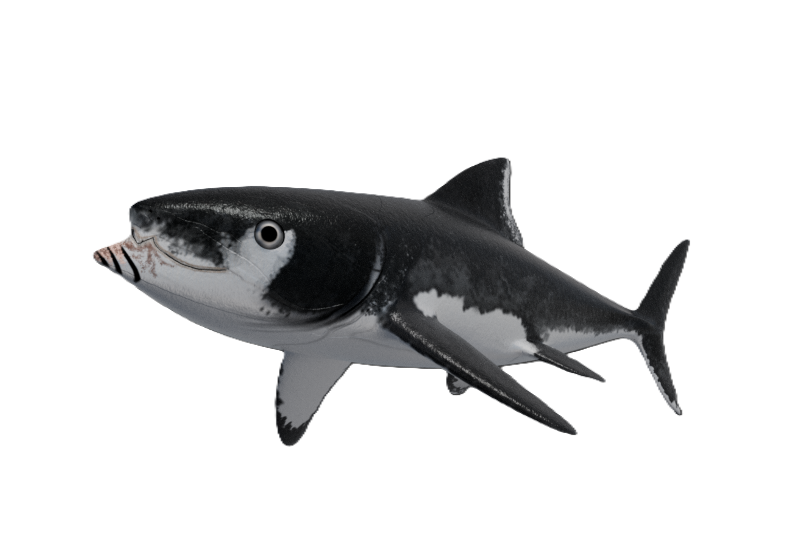
- Life restoration of Bungartius

Scientific classification
- Kingdom: Animalia
- Phylum: Chordata
- Class: †Placodermi
- Order: †Arthrodira
- Suborder: †Brachythoraci
- Infraorder: †Coccosteina
- Superfamily: †Dinichthyloidea
- Family: †Bungartiidae
- Genus: †Bungartius; Dunkle, 1947

Type species
- †Bungartius perissus Dunkle, 1947

= Bungartius =

Bungartius Temporal range: Late Devonian (Famennian), 362.6–360.1 Ma

Extinct genus of placoderm fish

Bungartius is an extinct genus of arthrodire ("joint-necked") fish from the Late Devonian period of Ohio. It is the sole member of the family Bungartiidae, related to the giant Titanichthys. The first specimen of Bungartius was recovered by Peter A. Bungart in Cuyahuga County, Ohio, and came from strata belonging to the Cleveland Shale Member of the Ohio Shale. A second, more complete specimen was discovered in 1943 by David H. Dunkle, who, four years later, named a new genus and species to accommodate them. Bungartius may have been durophagous, meaning that it would have eaten hard-shelled invertebrates.

== Discovery ==
In 1936, Peter Anthony Bungart, a staff member of the Cleveland Museum of Natural History, recovered a concretion containing the dorsal and ventral armour plates of an unknown fish from Cuyahoga County, Ohio, by Peter A. Bungart. The concretion originated from the Cleveland Shale, sometimes considered a stratigraphic unit of the Ohio Shales. The specimen was transported to the museum and catalogued as CMNH 6666. In 1943, palaeontologist David H. Dunkle recovered an almost complete specimen (CMNH 7573), which was around twice as large as that recovered by Bungart. He concluded that it was an arthrodire, a member of an order of extinct fishes which also includes Dunkleosteus, Heterosteus and Titanichthys. In 1947, Dunkle described the two specimens and erected a new taxon, Bungartius perissus.

== Taxonomy ==
In his 1947 paper describing Bungartius, David H. Dunkle expressed his uncertainty at its phylogenetic relationships. He did, however, note similarities between it, titanichthyids (a family that now exclusively includes Titanichthys), and Diplognathus, and suggested that it may have been most closely related to the latter. In 1975, Robert Howland Denison assigned Bungartius to a family of its own, Bungartiidae. He suggested that the family belonged to Pachyosteina, a paraphyletic placoderm clade that represented the "dominant placoderms of the Upper Devonian".

In a 2017 phylogenetic analysis, Bungartius was placed as an intermediate between Tafilalichthys and Titanichthys.

- - Rhachiosteus pterygiatus
  - - Tapinosteus heintzi
    - - Trematosteus fontanellus
      - - - Bruntonichthys multidens
          - Kendrickichthys cavernosus
        - - Bullerichthys fascidens
          - - Dinichthys herzeri
            - - Hadrosteus rapax
              - Aspinothoracida
                - - Gorgonichthys clarki
                  - - Heintzichthys gouldii
                    - Selenosteidae
                - Mylostomatidae?
                  - Tafilalichthys lavocati
                  - - Bungartius perissus
                    - Titanichthyidae
                      - Titanichthys agassizi
                      - Titanichthys cf. clarki

== Description ==
Bungartius was a mid-sized arthrodire, with a total cranial shield length, measured from the rostral tip to the hind margin of the paranuchal bones (analogous to the tabular bones of modern bony fishes), of 40.5 cm (15.9 in). It is preserved approximately as wide as it is long, though was likely fairly long, low, and narrow. The orbits (eye sockets) were oriented laterally (on the side of the skull), at around the middle third of the skull's length. The inferognathal plates, those of the lower jaw, are non-cuspidate (lacking cusps), and were quite large, terminating in a short, downward-inclined extremity. The inferognathal plates' symphyseal regions bore thickened occlusal surfaces that were ideally suited as shearing surfaces, and it has been suggested as a result that Bungartius was durophagous. It is not clear whether Bungartius had a Meckelian groove, though it may have been absent.

=== Postcranial skeleton ===
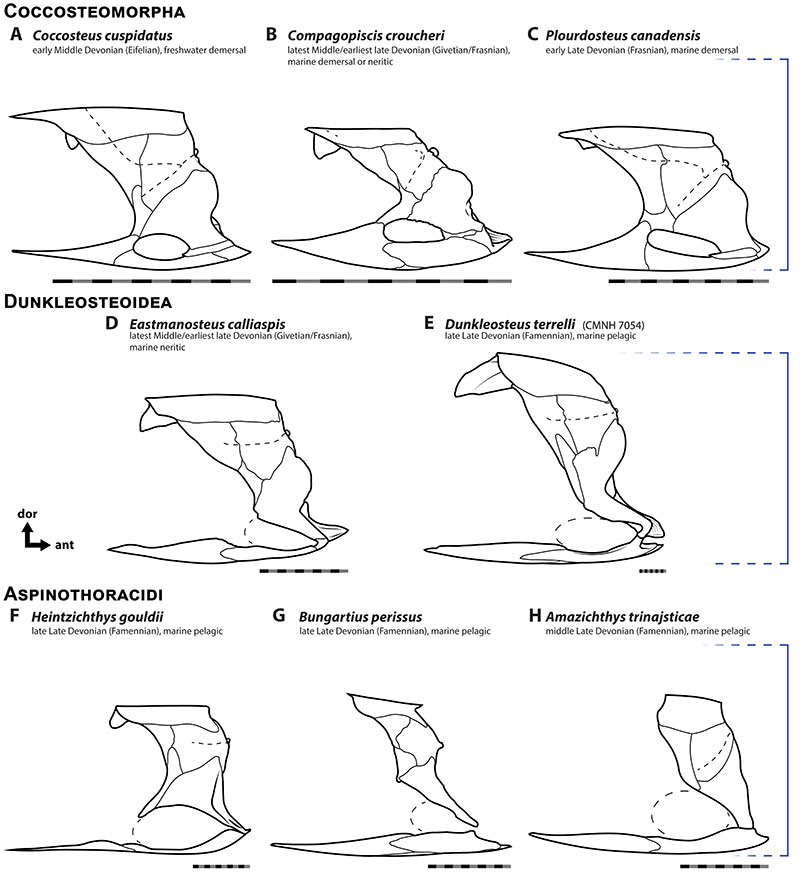
Comparison between the thoracic armour of several arthrodires. G is Bungartius perissus.

The dorsal (upper) body armour is fairly short, though is low and narrow, like the skull. The mediodorsal bone, that comprising the very top portion of the body armour, is wider than it is long. The anterior (front) and posterior (rear) dorsolateral bones are large, about half as high as long, expanding the most longitudinally (length-wise) in the dorsal half. The anterolateral bones are triangular, with brief expansion of the posterodorsal lamina and slight concavity in the anterodorsal border. The spinal plates, which sit in front of the pectoral fenestra (where the pectoral fin attaches) are completely atrophied, and, as of yet, the postero-laterals have not been identified. The interolateral bones (those at the lower anterior portion of the body armour) are long and slender, with ventral thickening. The ventral (lower) body armour is less reduced than the dorsal armour. The neck slit, the region where the cranial shield articulates with the body armour, is sloping, which is the basal condition among antiarchs.

== See also ==
- List of placoderms
