= Spanish bread =

Spanish bread can refer to:

- Bread in Spain
- Candeal bread, a type of bread from Spain also known as Spanish bread in some languages (pain espagnol, pão espanhol, etc.)
- Spanish bread, also known as Señorita bread, a type of elongated bread roll from the Philippines with sweet fillings
