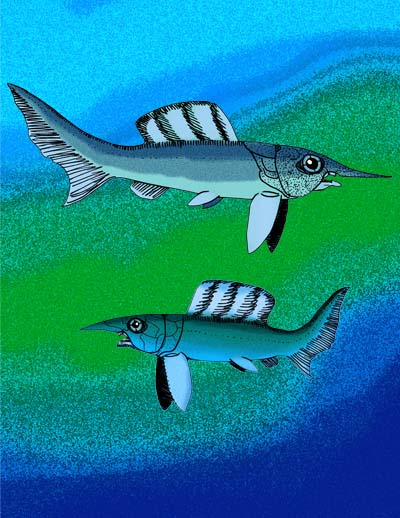
- Artist's reconstructions

Scientific classification
- Kingdom: Animalia
- Phylum: Chordata
- Class: †Placodermi
- Order: †Arthrodira
- Suborder: †Brachythoraci
- Family: †Brachydeiridae
- Genus: †Oxyosteus; Jaekel, 1911

Type species
- Oxyosteus rostratus Gross, 1932

Species
- Oxyosteus rostratus Gross, 1932; Oxyosteus magnus Gross, 1932

Synonyms
- Platyosteus Jaekel, 1919

= Oxyosteus =

Oxyosteus Temporal range: Middle to Late Frasnian

Extinct genus of fishes

Oxyosteus is a genus of trout-sized, highly compressed arthrodire placoderms from the Late Devonian of Europe: The two described species are restricted to the Late Frasnian-aged Kellwasserkalk Fauna of Bad Wildungen, while a median dorsal plate of an unnamed species is known from the Middle Frasnian Holy Cross Mountains of Poland.

Species have, in cross section, an extremely compressed body, a pointed, highly elongated snout, and tremendous orbits. The living animals would have superficially resembled modern-day needlefish or houndfish. As per the family, the trunk shield is short. The genus is distinguished from other members of the family in that the plates are very thin, and the dermal surface is typically covered in small, closely packed tubercles. The genus was originally placed in its own family, but was then later determined to be closely related to Brachydeirus and Synauchenia, and was then merged into the family Brachydeiridae.

== Species ==
=== Oxyosteus rostratus ===
The type species is the smaller of the two described species. It has a stout, triangular shaped rostrum, and very small tubercles. O. rostratus differs from O. magnus in that the former has a short antero-ventral process on its anterior lateral plate, and has a long and narrow anterior ventro-lateral plate. Skull lengths range from 11 to 13 cm.

=== Oxyosteus magnus ===
Oxyosteus magnus is the larger of the two described species from Bad Wildungen; the skull length of the holotype is 18 cm long. In addition to size, O. magnus differs from O. rostratus by having a very thin, needle-like rostrum, an anterior lateral plate with a long antero-ventral process, and a broad and short anterior ventro-lateral plate.

=== Oxyosteus sp. ===
This unnamed species is based on an incomplete median dorsal plate suggestive of Oxyosteus. The plate was found in the Middle Frasnian portion of the Late Devonian strata of the Holy Cross Mountains in Poland.

== See also ==
- List of placoderms
