= Erromenosteus =

Erromenosteus Temporal range: Late Frasnian

Scientific classification
- Missing taxonomy template (fix): Erromenosteus

Type species
- †Erromenosteus lucifer Jaekel, 1919

Species
- E. lucifer Jaekel, 1919; E. brachyrostris (Stensiö, 1963); E. concavus (Gross, 1932); E. diensti (Stensiö, 1959); E. inflatus (Stensiö, 1963); E. koeneni (Stensiö, 1963); E. platycephalus (Gross, 1932)

Synonyms
- Erromenosteidae Obruchev, 1964; Leiosteus Gross, 1932; Paraleiosteus (Stensiö, 1959); Coccosteus inflatus; Brachydeirus inflatus

Extinct genus of fishes

Erromenosteus is a genus of extinct, medium-sized brachythoracid arthrodire placoderm from the Late Frasnian of the Kellwasserkalk facies of Late Devonian Bad Wildungen and Bicken, Germany.

The various species had bullet-shaped heads, and curved, crushing jaws.

== Species list ==
As was mentioned, all known species are from the German Kellwasserkalk facies. Denison (1978) says that the various species need to be revised, as many of the species were originally described as specimens of other species. Obruchev (1932) and Miles (1969) placed Leiosteus (=Erromenosteus) within Pachyosteidae (before Pachyosteidae was merged into Selenosteidae). Now, though, Erromenosteus is considered a basal member of Dinichthyloidea.

=== Erromenosteus ===
- Erromenosteus lucifer, the type species. The holotype is a 12 centimetres (4.7 in) long skull.

=== Leiosteus ===
These species were originally classified within Leiosteus before the genus was synonymized with Erromenosteus.

- Erromenosteus brachyrostris, currently known from a single 6 centimetres (2.4 in) long skull, originally referred to E. inflatus.
- Erromenosteus concavus, known from several specimens, average skull length ranging from 7 centimetres (2.8 in) - 13 centimetres (5.1 in).
- Erromenosteus inflatus, this species was originally referred to as Coccosteus inflatus, then Brachydeirus inflatus, before being placed within Leiosteus. The length of the holotype skull is 8 centimetres (3.1 in)
- Erromenosteus koeneni Apparently a nomen nudum, the holotype skull is 60 millimetres (2.4 in) long.
- Erromenosteus platycephalus Denison (1978) notes that it has never been figured.

=== Paraleiosteus ===
- Erromenosteus diensti: its holotype was originally referred as a specimen of E. concavus (=Leiosteus concavus) by Gross (1932), but Stensiö erected a new genus, "Paraleiosteus," for the specimen on account of differences seen in its scapulo-coracoid bone. The holotype's skull is 12 centimetres (4.7 in) long.
