= Aragonese cuisine =

Culinary traditions of Aragón, Spain

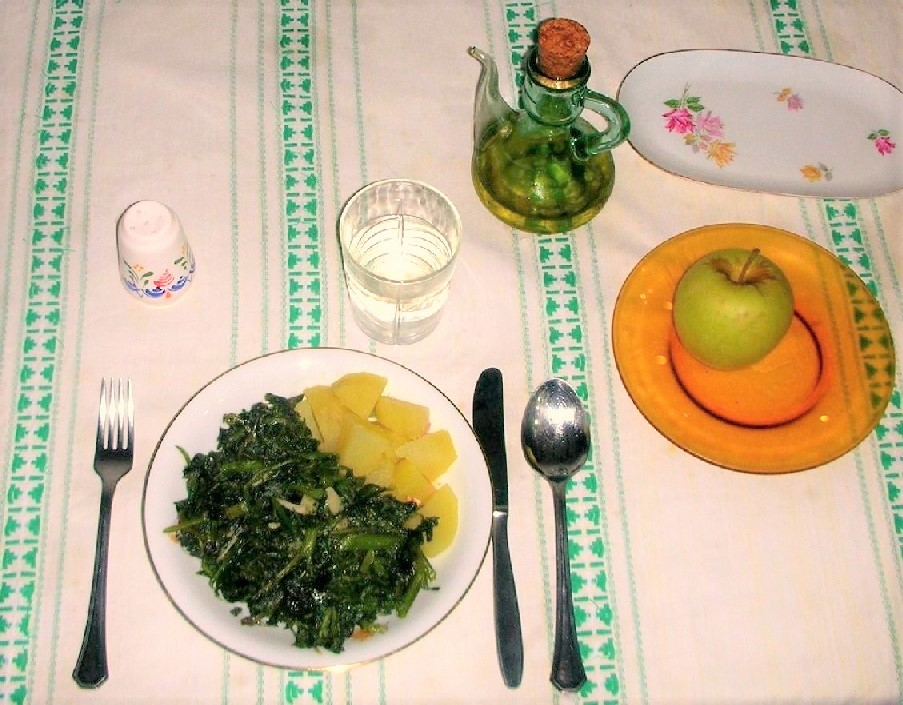
Borage leaves boiled and sautéed with garlic, served with potatoes in the style of Huesca Province.

The Aragonese cuisine includes several typical dishes and ingredients of the local cuisine of Aragon, a community in Spain.

== Dishes and ingredients ==
One of the most characteristic dishes of the traditional gastronomy of Aragon is roast lamb (prepared especially with ewes), known as ternasco. Salted cod imported from other parts of Spain was also traditionally used in some dishes such as albóndigas de bacalao.

Some of the most well-known main ingredients include ham (jamón) from Teruel, olive oil from Empeltre and Arbequina olives, sweet varieties of onion, and unusual vegetables such as local varieties of chard, borage and cardoon.

Sweet Aragonese specialities are the trenza de Almudevar, the tortas de alma, guirlache (a type of nougat), adoquines, frutas de Aragón (a confit of fruit covered in chocolate) and Españoletas (a kind of local cookie).

== Breads ==
- Pan de cinta
- Pan de pintera, pintadera or estrella
- Pan de cañada (bread with olive oil)
- Pan de San Jorge (Saint George bread)
- Regañao (pizza-like bread)
- Trenza (braided sweetbread)
- Culeca
- Torta de cañamones
- Chusco
- Pan dormido

== Wines ==
The best-known wines of Aragon are those from Cariñena, Somontano (Huesca), Calatayud and Campo de Borja.
