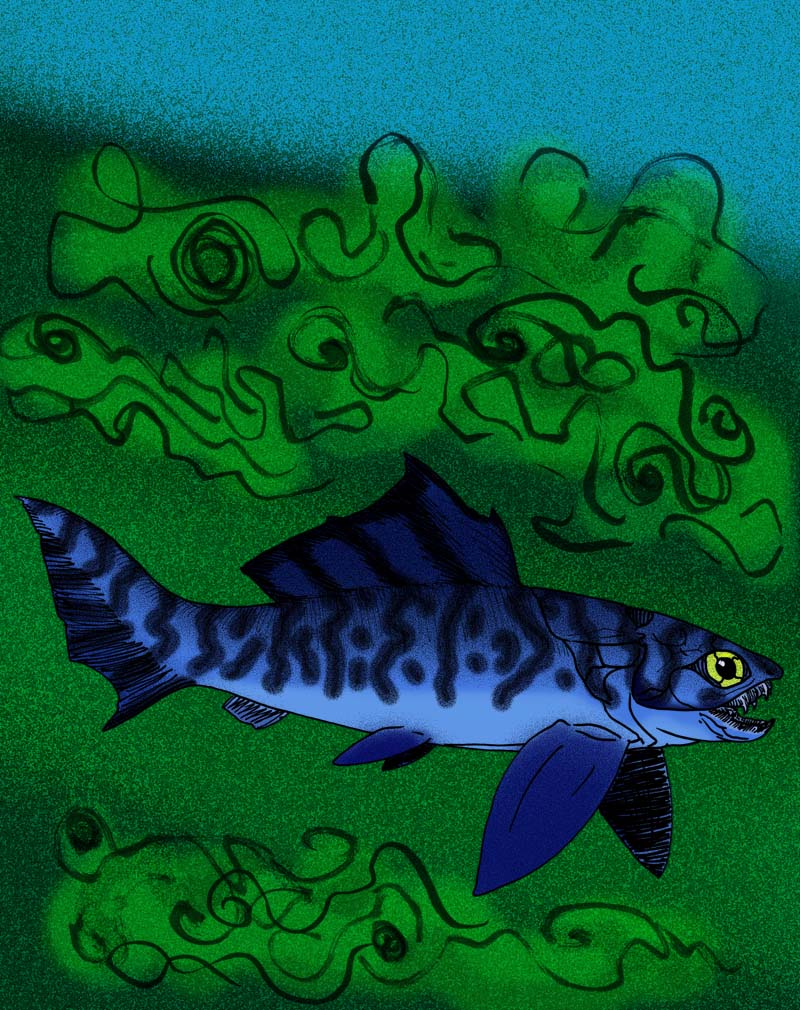
- Reconstruction of Hadrosteus

Scientific classification
- Kingdom: Animalia
- Phylum: Chordata
- Class: †Placodermi
- Order: †Arthrodira
- Suborder: †Brachythoraci
- Superfamily: †Dinichthyloidea
- Family: †Hadrosteidae; Gross, 1932

Type species
- Hadrosteus rapax Gross, 1932

Genera
- Hadrosteus; ?Diplognathus

= Hadrosteidae =

Hadrosteidae Temporal range: Late Devonian

Extinct family of fishes

Hadrosteidae is a family of arthrodire placoderms from the Late Devonian. It was originally erected for the late Frasnian Hadrosteus, from the Kellwasserkalk facies. Later, the family was subjectively subsumed into Dinichthyidae due to Hadrosteus' anatomical similarities with Dunkleosteus and Dinichthys. In 1967, Obruchev placed the enigmatic arthrodire incertae sedis Diplognathus, from the Eastern American Famennian, within Hadrosteidae, on the basis of how the two genera have similar denticle ("teeth") patterns of the inferognathals, though, Denison (1978) contests this placement. With the redefining of Dinichthyidae as a monotypic family for Dinichthys, and only a few other genera placed within Dunkleosteidae, Hadrosteidae is now seen as a valid family again.
