= Cañada bread =

Spanish bread

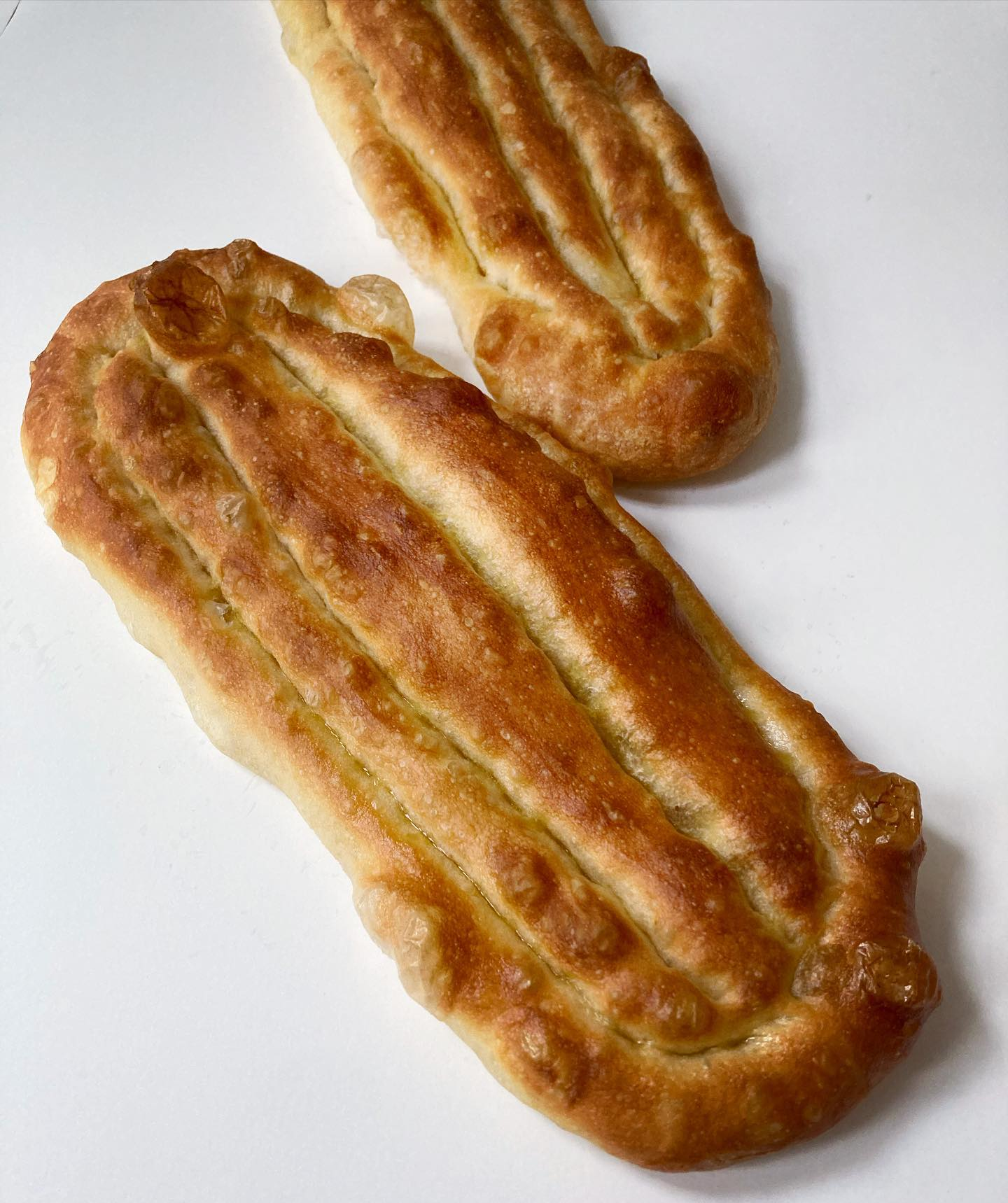
Cañada breads

Pan de cañada ("drovers' road bread" in Spanish), or simply cañada, is a variety of torta (flatbread) typical from the center and south of Aragon, in north Spain. It has an elongated and rounded shape, very variable in size, with characteristic grooves in the form of acanaladuras ('channels') or hoyuelos ('dimples') on its surface to cover it with extra virgin olive oil. Its crumb is very moist and spongy, with abundant irregular poring. Its crust is golden, shiny, thin and slightly crunchy. Cañadas can be sweet or savory. Depending on the town, or even the baker, this flatbread can have a rectangular, elliptical or oval shape, with greater or lesser size.

Cañada bread and other tortas fulfill the function of entering the oven first, since they lower its temperature and increase the humidity level, preparing it for the following batches of bread. Where the cañada has the most tradition is in Lower Aragón, although it has spread widely throughout the three Aragonese provinces thanks to the transhumant shepherds who used to consume it during their long journeys through drovers' road or cañadas in Spanish, hence its name. The olive oil acts as a natural preservative, so that the bread could remain tender for the several weeks that the trip lasted. Despite being a simple oiled dough flatbread, in each town in Aragon, the recipe can be noticeably different.

Since 2008, the cañada bread has been covered by the C'Alial brand, a quality guarantee seal from the Government of Aragon, along with the chusco, the pintadera bread from Teruel, and the pan de cinta from Zaragoza.

== Common names ==
It is called raspao in Híjar, guitar in Cariñena, bollo in Calamocha, torta floja in Biel, and sequillo in other towns.

== See also ==
- Spanish bread culture
- Cuisine of Aragon
- Regañao
