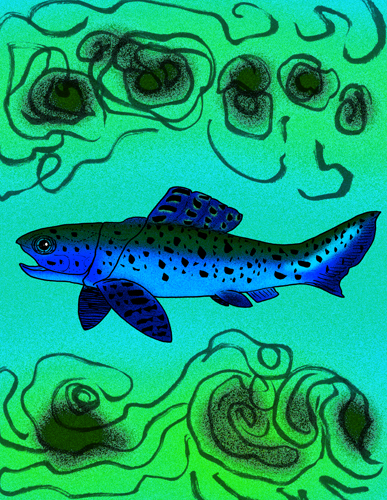
- Restoration of B. grandis

Scientific classification
- Kingdom: Animalia
- Phylum: Chordata
- Class: †Placodermi
- Order: †Arthrodira
- Suborder: †Brachythoraci
- Superfamily: †Brachydeiroidea
- Family: †Brachydeiridae; Gross, 1932

Type species
- Brachydeirus carinatus Gross, 1932

Genera
- Brachydeirus; Oxyosteus; Synauchenia

Synonyms
- Brachydiridae Gross, 1932; Synaucheniidae Gross, 1932; Auchenosteidae Jaekel, 1911; Oxyosteidae Gross, 1932

= Brachydeiridae =

Brachydeiridae Temporal range: Middle to Late Frasnian

Extinct family of fishes

Brachydeiridae is a family of small to moderately large-sized arthrodire placoderms from the Late Devonian of Europe, restricted primarily to the Kellwasserkalk Fauna of Bad Wildungen and Adorf.

Brachydeirids have, in cross section, a highly compressed body, a pointed, sometimes highly elongated snout, and tremendous orbits. The plates of the trunk shield are noticeably shortened: in Synauchenia, the trunk shield and head shield are fused together as a single, immovable unit. The superficial anatomy of brachydeirids is extremely diverse, and each genus has been previously placed in their own monogeneric families.

The brachydeirids, together with Leptosteus, make up the superfamily Brachydeiroidea.

== Genera ==
=== Brachydeirus ===
The half a dozen species of Brachydeirus are comparable (on a superficial level) in form and size to trout or small mackerels. The biting surfaces of the infragnathals are smooth and thick, suggesting an adaptation for crushing. Species of Brachydeirus are all restricted to the Kellwasserkalk Fauna of Bad Wildungen and Adorf.

=== Oxyosteus ===
Oxyosteus is easily distinguished by a high, extremely compressed body and a long, thin rostrum. Two named species are known from the Bad Wildungen Kellwasserkalk Fauna, while a dorsal plate of an as of yet unnamed species is known from the middle Frasnian-aged portion of the Holy Cross Mountains of Poland.

=== Synauchenia ===
As mentioned earlier, Synauchenia is unique in the entire order for having the trunk and head shields fused together into an immovable unit. It is restricted to the Bad Wildungen Kellwasserkalk Fauna.

== See also ==
- List of placoderms
