= Regañao =

Turolense topped flatbread

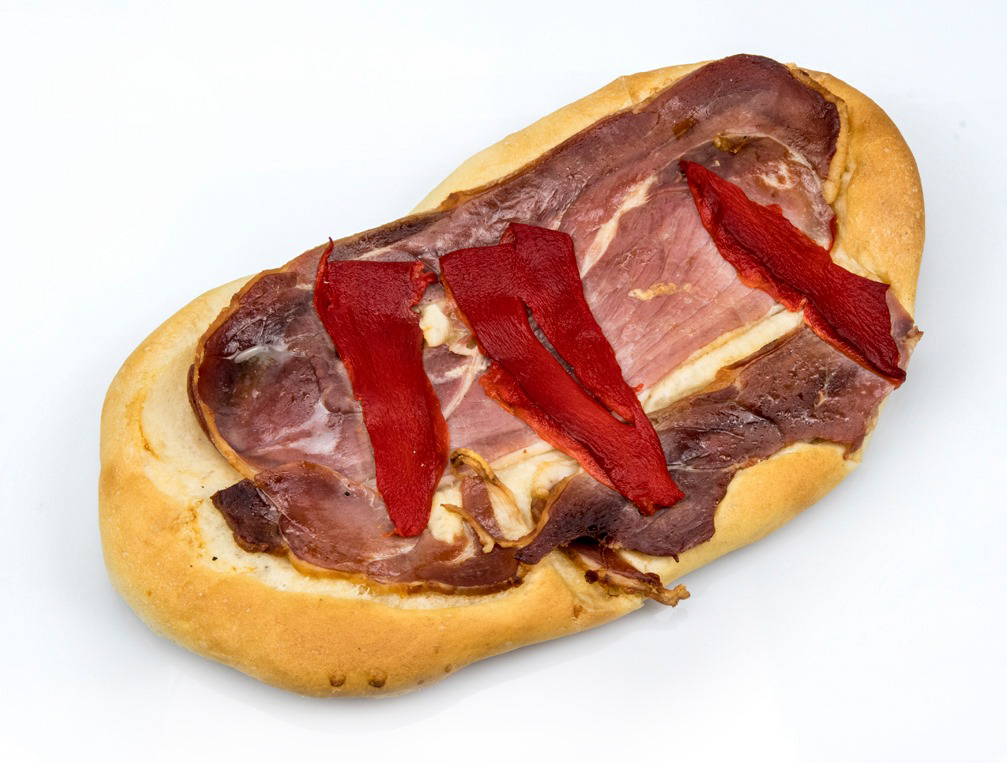
- Ham and pepper regañao
- Type: flatbread
- Place of origin: Teruel, Spain
- Associated cuisine: Aragonese cuisine
- Main ingredients: flour; water; yeast; olive oil; piquillo pepper; Teruel ham or sardines
- Similar dishes: bollo de Requena

Regañao (Spanish pronunciation: [reɡaˈɲao]) is a topped flatbread –similar to a pizza– typical of the Teruel area, in Spain. It has an elongated and rounded shape, and it is covered with salted sardines (sometimes herring) or slices of Teruel ham, all accompanied by strips of red bell pepper that are usually embed in the dough. Regañaos are typical of the Aragonese cuisine, and are often accompanied with wine.

== Origin ==
Similar breads are prepared in other areas of the Celtiberian Mountain Range, such as the bollo of Requena, province of Valencia, or the ham and bacon tortas from Almodóvar del Pinar, province of Cuenca. It should not be confused with the Andalusian regañá, a very thin and crisp bread. A bakery in Teruel assures that the regañao arose in its oven at the beginning of the 20th century, when the neighbors asked the baker to make this flatbread for them so insistently, that he thought he was being scolded (regaña'o in Spanish means 'scolded').

== Culture ==
In the city of Teruel, regañaos is common in the so-called fiestas vaquilleras ('heifer festivals'). One of the most popular is the Fiestas del Ángel de Teruel, held during the first fortnight of July. They can be topped with ham or sardines. Regañaos are a popular food of the peñas, being habitual in snacks accompanied with wine from the area. In the popular festivals of Spain, the peñas are informal associations of friends, who meet before the fiesta mayor to eat, drink, talk and dance. In the Plaza del Torico, Teruel, a giant regañao is made, and then distributed among the attendees.

== See also ==
- Bread culture in Spain
- Pan de cañada
