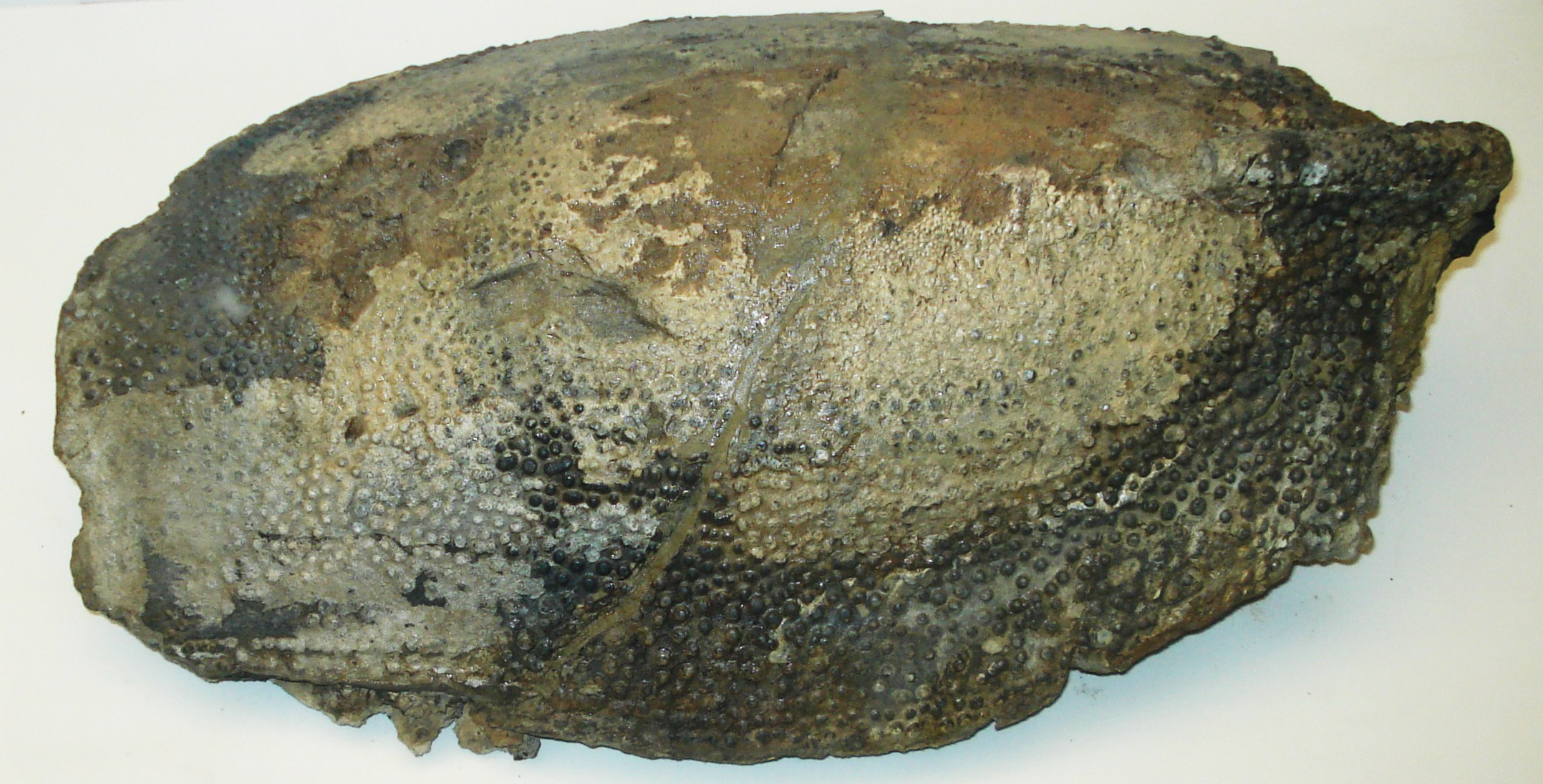
- Dorsal shield

Scientific classification
- Kingdom: Animalia
- Phylum: Chordata
- Class: †Placodermi
- Order: †Arthrodira
- Genus: †Aspidichthys; Newberry, 1873

Type species
- Aspidichthys clavatus Newberry, 1873

Species
- A. clavatus Newberry, 1873; A. ingens Koenen, 1883

Synonyms
- Anomalichthys scaber Koenen, 1883

= Aspidichthys =

Aspidichthys Temporal range: Frasnian

Extinct genus of fishes

Aspidichthys ("shield fish") is a genus of large, distinctively tuberculated arthrodire placoderm of uncertain affinities from Upper Devonian marine strata in the Eastern United States and Europe.

== Anatomy ==
The dermal surfaces of the thick bones are decorated with an irregular arrangement of large, rounded tubercles. Some specimens may display patterns of "imperfectly concentric rows." The long median dorsal plate is subrectangular in shape, and is gently bent along the midline, which tends to have a corresponding low ridge, and a posteriorly placed carinal process on the dorsal surface. In 1938, Schmidt made a restoration of A. ingens as a large-bodied, small-headed arthrodire with tremendous orbits after the now-lost holotype of that species.

== Taxonomy ==
The taxonomic relationships of the genus remain uncertain. Miles, 1973, suggested the genus was related to the Euleptaspidae, though, this is disproved through noting the drastically different proportions of the nuchal and median dorsal plates. Schmidt's restoration of the animal as having a large body and a small head has led some paleontologists to suspect a relationship with the holonematids. However, this relationship is also doubtful, as the holonematids' median dorsal plates differ from those of Aspidichthys by the former being more narrower, having a low keel, and having no carinal process.

== Species ==
A. clavatus is the type species, and is known from distinctive fragments found in the Frasnian-aged Huron and Olentangy Shales of Ohio. It has a "gently folded" median dorsal plate, and has a low crest placed on the posterior end of the median dorsal's midline. The length of the median dorsal ranges from 39 to 44 centimeters.

Aspidichthys ingens is a second, tremendously large species, known from Frasnian-aged strata of Rheinland, Germany, the Holy Cross Mountains of Poland, Moroccan strata, and possibly from Iran. The 80 centimeter-long nuchal plate is much more steeply-folded than that of A. clavatus. According to Dennison 1978, the huge size of the nuchal plate makes A. ingens "the largest arthrodire in Europe."
