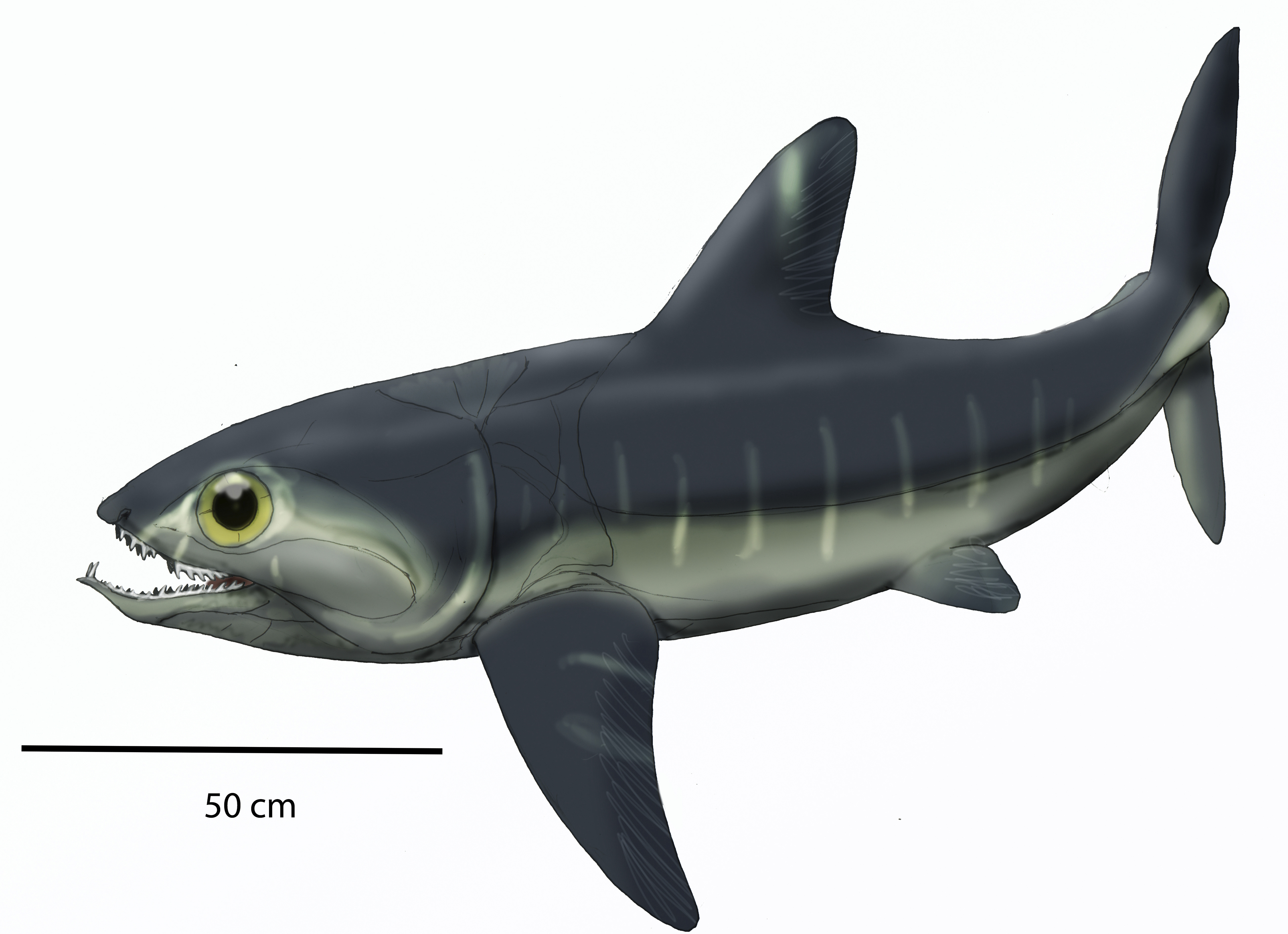
- Life restoration of D. mirabilis

Scientific classification
- Kingdom: Animalia
- Phylum: Chordata
- Class: †Placodermi
- Order: †Arthrodira
- Suborder: †Brachythoraci
- Family: †Hadrosteidae
- Genus: †Diplognathus; Newberry, 1878

Type species
- Diplognathus mirabilis Newberry, 1878

Species
- D. mirabilis Newberry, 1878; D. larfargei Carr, 2005

= Diplognathus =

Diplognathus Temporal range: Late Famennian

Extinct genus of fishes

Diplognathus is a genus of arthrodire placoderm from the Late Famennian Cleveland Shale of Late Devonian Ohio, known only from incomplete fragments of jaws and skulls. What fragments are known suggest that the living animals were large-eyed piscivores with weak, but widely gaping jaws. D. mirabilis is thought to be fairly large, with infragnathals up to 45 centimeters in length. The second species, D. larfargei, was much smaller, with inferognathals averaging about 4 centimeters in length.

In 1967, Obruchev placed this genus within Hadrosteidae, on the basis of how the two genera have similar denticle ("teeth") patterns of the inferognathals, though Denison (1978) contested this placement, preferring to leave the taxon as Arthrodira incertae sedis.
