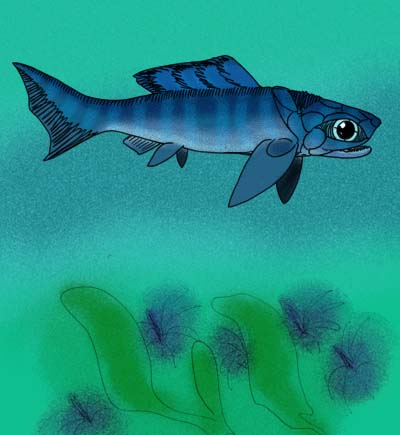
- reconstruction of Selenosteus

Scientific classification
- Kingdom: Animalia
- Phylum: Chordata
- Class: †Placodermi
- Order: †Arthrodira
- Suborder: †Brachythoraci
- Infraorder: †Coccosteina
- Superfamily: †Dinichthyloidea; Newberry, 1885

Families
- See text

= Dinichthyloidea =

Dinichthyloidea Temporal range: Late Silurian? to Late Devonian

Extinct superfamily of fishes

The Dinichthyloidea is an extinct superfamily of placoderms, armored fish most diverse during the Devonian. However, the term is no longer in use, as modern cladistical methods have produced alternative phylogenetic trees of Brachythoraci with new subdivisions.

== Systematics ==
- Basal genus Erromenosteus
- Family Dinichthyidae
- Family Trematosteidae
- Family Rhachiosteidae
- Family Pachyosteidae
- Family Titanichthyidae
- Family Bungartiidae
- Family Selenosteidae
- Family Mylostomatidae
