= Trenza =

Spanish pastry

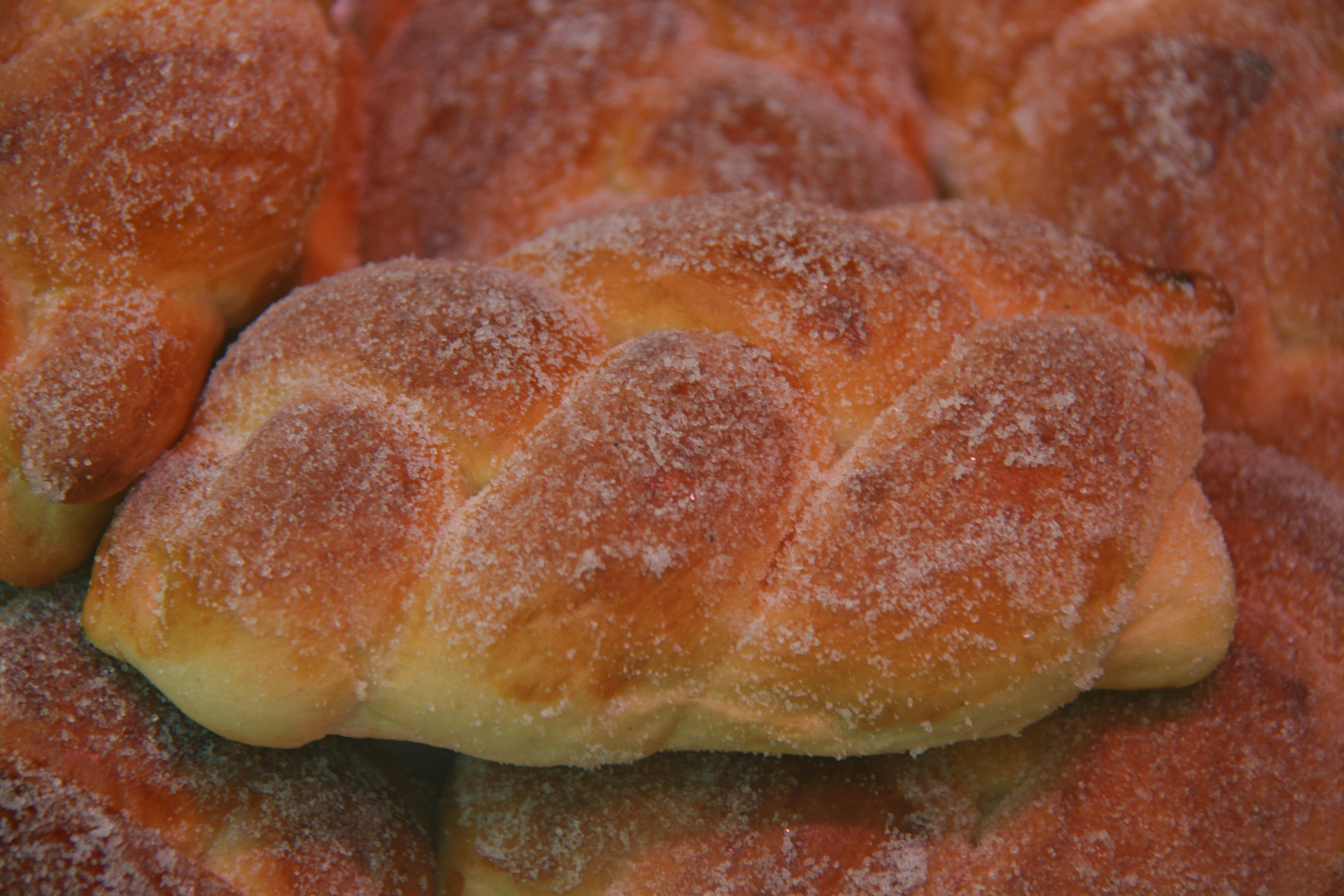
- Trenza from Madrid, Spain
- Type: Bread or pastry

Trenza, meaning braid in Spanish, is a braided pastry (pan trenza) or bread (trenza de brioche) that can contain fruit or other fillings. In Colombian cuisine, a trenza of cheese and guava is traditional. In Spain's Aragon community, the traditional style is trenza de Almudevar, with nuts, raisins, walnuts and almonds, and is a signature product of the Tolosana bakeries. In Spain, trenzas glaseadas (glazed trenzas) are also served.

== See also ==
- List of pastries
