= Henri Termier =

French geologist (1897–1989)

Professor Henri-François-Émile Termier (13 December 1897 – 12 August 1989) was a French geologist.

Born in Lyon into a scholarly family, he served in the First World War as an artillery officer during which he earned the Croix de Guerre. After working as an assistant at the university in Montpellier (1923 - 1925), he became a geologist working for the Service géologique du Maroc (Morocco Mine Service), where he worked until 1940. He became well known for his studies of stratigraphy and fossil fauna, including the discovery of the first specimens of Titanichthys agassizi. Later, he taught at the university of Algeria (1945), and ten years later, he became a chairman at the Sorbonne. He was married to professor Geneviève Termier, another prominent French paleontologist.

== Selected bibliography ==
- Paleontologie marocaine, 5 volumes, with Geneviève Termier
- Etudes geologiques sur le Maroc central et le Moyen Atlas septentrional
- Traite de geologie
- Traite de stratigraphie
- Biologie des premiers fossiles
- Les Animaux prehistoriques
- Histoire de la Terre
