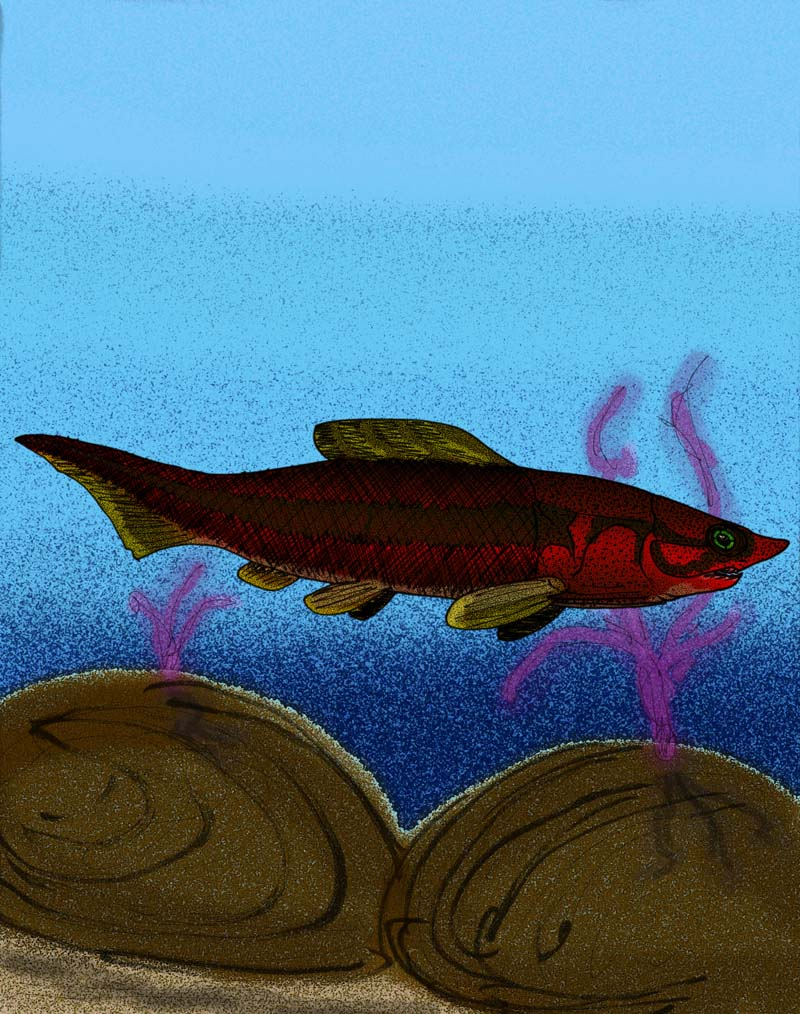
- Artist's reconstruction

Scientific classification
- Kingdom: Animalia
- Phylum: Chordata
- Class: †Placodermi
- Order: †Arthrodira
- Suborder: †Brachythoraci
- Genus: †Maideria
- Species: †M. falipoui

Binomial name
- †Maideria falipoui Lelièvre 1995

= Maideria =

Maideria Temporal range: Givetian

Extinct genus of fishes

Maideria falipoui is a long-snouted brachythoracid arthrodire placoderm from the Lower Middle Givetian epoch of Middle Devonian South Morocco, in what is now the Anti-Atlas Mountains. Although M. falipoui superficially resembles Buchanosteus, albeit with an elongated snout or rostrum, M. falipoui is considered to be a basal member of the group Coccosteina, thus, it has not yet been given any familial ranking.
