= Geneviève Termier =

French paleontologist (1917–2005)

Geneviève Termier (2 April 1917 – 27 May 2005) was a French paleontologist and evolutionary biologist. She was a research director at the French National Centre for Scientific Research. In 1942 she went to Morocco where she met her husband Henri. Their son Michel was born three years later. She specialized in the study of gastropods. She also studied the South-East Asian Permian brachiopods. Together with her husband Henri Termier, she is considered one of the greatest French paleontologist of the 20th century. Geneviève Termier suffered from a long and painful illness, and on 27 May 2005 in Saint-Rémy-lès-Chevreuse near Paris, she died at 88 years of age.

== Selected bibliography ==
- Paléontologie marocaine - 5 volumes
- Histoire géologique de la biosphère
- Formation des continents et progression de la vie
- L'évolution de la lithosphère
- Quelques faits paléogéographiques et paléoécologiques relatifs à la limite de l'antécambrien et du cambrien
- Bryozoaires du paléozoïque supérieur de l'afghanistan
- Réflexions sur la sédimentation marine dans ses rapports avec l'érosion continentale
- Generalites sur les invertebres fossiles
- La trame géologique de l'histoire humaine
- Initiation à la paléontologie
- Sur la partie inférieure du flysch crétacé du djurjura - all with Henri Termier
