= Celtiberian Range =

Area of Spain

Celtiberian Range (in Spanish language: Serranía Celtibérica), also called South Lapland or Spanish Lapland (Laponia del Sur or Laponia Española), is the geographical term given to a small part of Spain due to its lower population and lack of infrastructure.

Its nomenclature comes from the Celtiberians, a pre-Roman tribe who lived in this area long ago.

== Geography ==
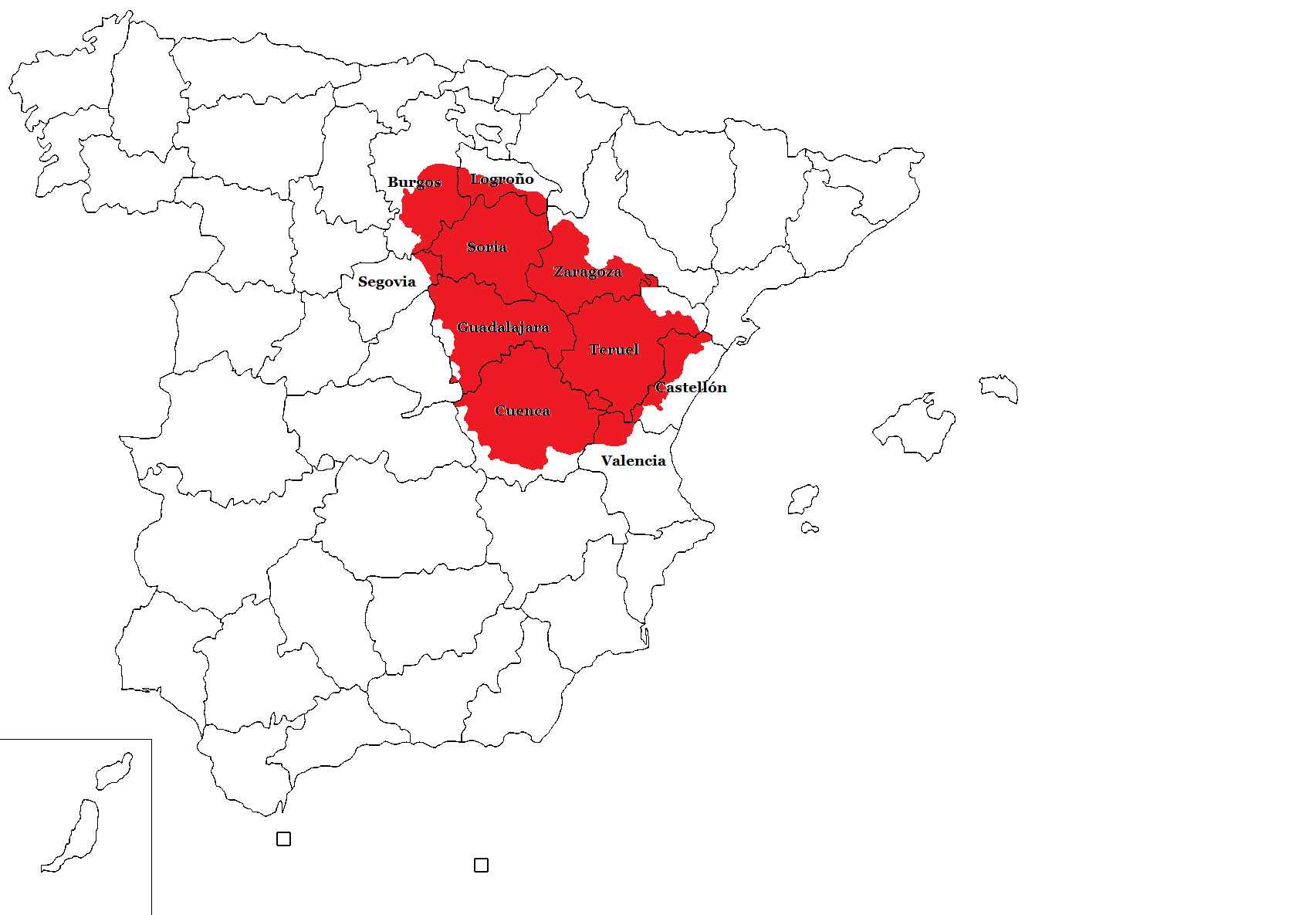
Coloured in red, Spanish Lapland area

It comprises an area of 63,098 km². Through the range are 1,632 municipalities among several provinces. All but the Valencian Community are landlocked.

It has a population of 503,566 inhabitants.

Autonomous Community	Province(s)
Aragón	Teruel Zaragoza
Castile-La Mancha	Cuenca Guadalajara
Castile and León	Burgos Segovia Soria
La Rioja	Logroño
Valencian Community	Castellón Valencia
