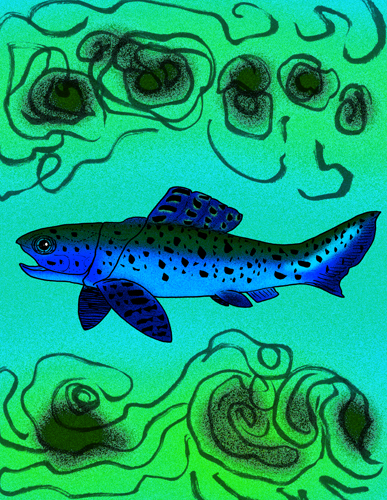
- Restoration of B. grandis

Scientific classification
- Kingdom: Animalia
- Phylum: Chordata
- Class: †Placodermi
- Order: †Arthrodira
- Suborder: †Brachythoraci
- Family: †Brachydeiridae
- Genus: †Brachydeirus; Koenen, 1880

Type species
- Brachydeirus carinatus Gross, 1932

Species
- B. bicarinatus Stensio, 1963; B. carinatus Gross, 1932; B. gracilis Gross, 1932; B. grandis Gross, 1932; B. magnus Gross, 1933; B. minor Gross, 1932

Synonyms
- Brachydirus Gross, 1932; Anomalichthys (in part) Koenen, 1883; Auchenosteus Jaekel, 1911

= Brachydeirus =

Brachydeirus Temporal range: Late Frasnian

Extinct genus of fishes

Brachydeirus is a genus of small to moderately large-sized arthrodire placoderms from the Late Devonian of Europe, restricted to the Kellwasserkalk Fauna of Bad Wildungen and Adorf.

Species have, in cross section, a highly compressed body, a pointed, sometimes highly elongated snout, and tremendous orbits. The living animals would have superficially resembled modern-day trout or small mackerels. As per the family, the trunk shield is short. The genus is distinguished from other members of the family in that the median dorsal plate of the trunk shield is often keeled, with the keel often very high and prominent.

== Species ==
=== Brachydeirus carinatus ===
The type species. The length of the skull of the holotype is 11.7 cm. Has a broad nuchal plate that is convex posteriorly. The dermal bones are decorated with large, concentrically arranged tubercles.

=== Brachydeirus bicarinatus ===
There is a postero-median process on the nuchal plate, and a pre-pineal fenestra in this species. The skull of the holotype is 8.5 cm long.

=== Brachydeirus gracilis ===
The smallest species in this genus: the skull length of the holotype is 6 cm. Differs from B. minor by having a more steeply arched back, smaller facial plates and a lack of a postpineal fenestra.

=== Brachydeirus grandis ===
One of the largest species in this genus: the skull length of the holotype is around 20 cm. Has a postpineal fenestra, an unusually long (for the genus/family) lateral trunk shield, and comparatively small orbits. The dermal bones are decorated with a pattern of small, evenly spaced tubercles.

=== Brachydeirus magnus ===
A very large species originally described as a specimen of Anomalichthys. Differs from B. grandis by having a very high, prominent thick keel on the posterior region of the median dorsal plate, and the dermal surface is covered in very large tubercles.

=== Brachydeirus minor ===
Another small species: the skull length of the holotype is 7.4 cm long. It differs from B. gracilis by having a posterio-median notch on the nuchal plate, the presence of a postpineal fenestra, and larger facial plates.

== See also ==
- List of placoderms
