= Pore (bread) =

Air pocket in bread

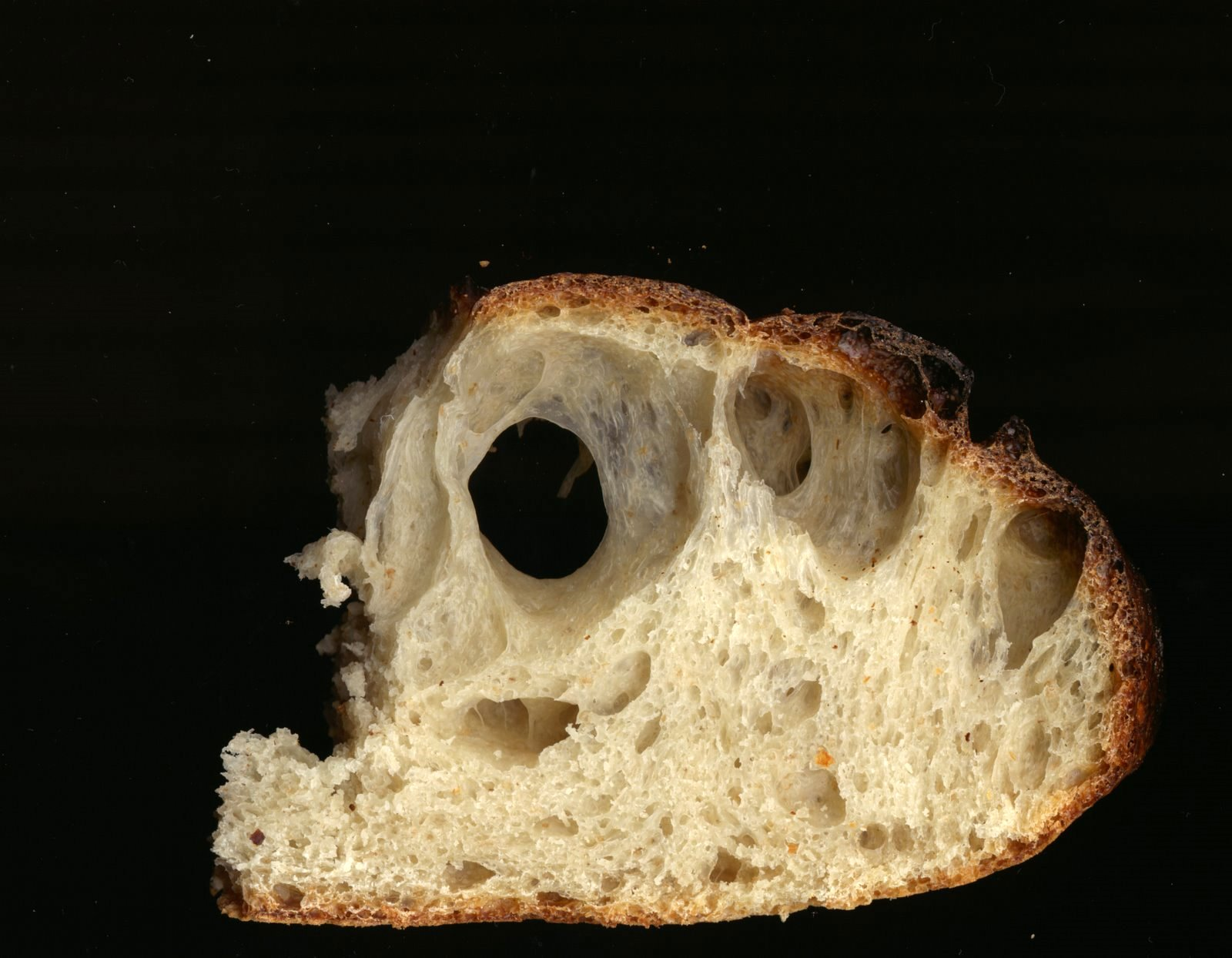
Sourdough bread pores

Pores are the air pockets found in leavened bread, where carbon dioxide from the fermentation process creates a network of primarily interconnected void structures. The degree to which pores form are a major determiner in the texture ("crumb") of the bread. Pore size varies between varieties of bread. Sourdough bread is a variety with larger pores. Rye bread has smaller pores and a denser crumb.

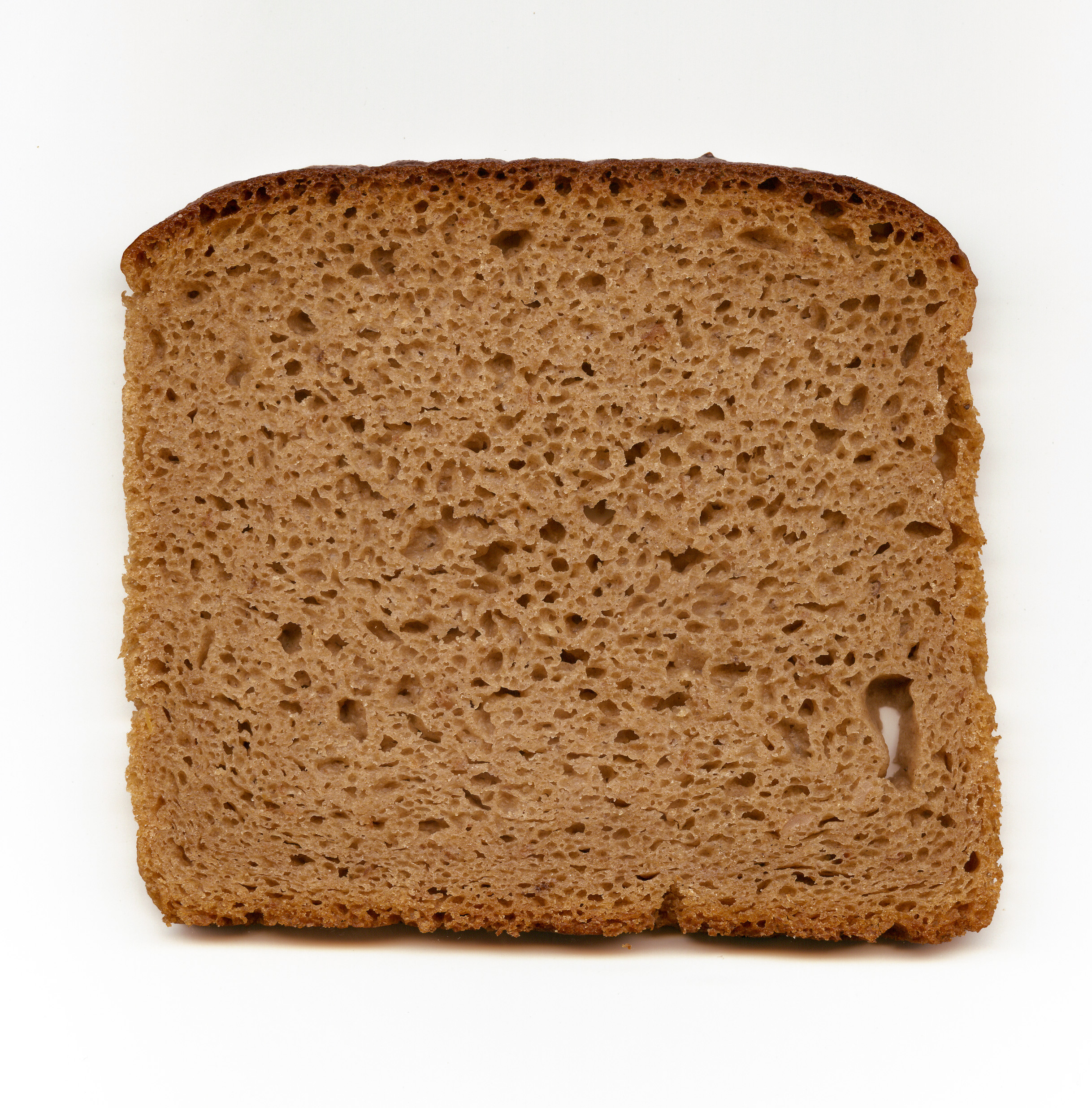
Rye bread pores
