= Walter R. Gross =

German paleontologist (1903–1974)

Walter Robert Gross (20 August 1903 – 9 June 1974) was a German palaeontologist. During his career, Gross made important studies on prehistoric fishes. He was the graduate mentor to paleontologists Hans-Peter Schultze and Klaus Fahlbusch. The genus Grossopterus was named in Gross' honor by fellow paleontologist Leif Størmer.
