= Jugal bone =

Skull bone found in most vertebrates

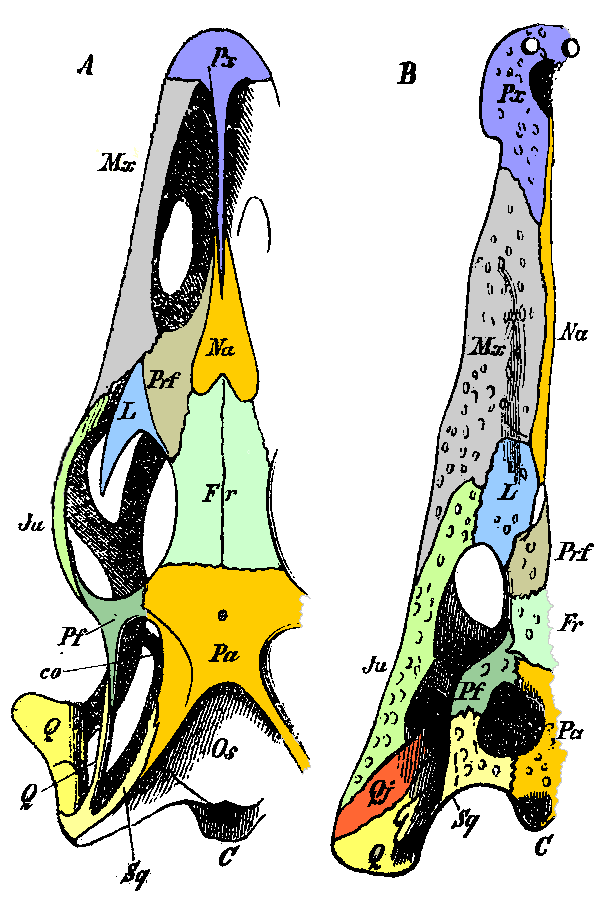
Diagram showing homologous bones of the skulls of a monitor lizard and a crocodile. Jugal bone labelled Ju, in pale green, at centre left.

The jugal is a skull bone found in most jawed vertebrates. In mammals, the jugal is often called the malar or zygomatic. It is connected to the quadratojugal and maxilla, as well as other bones, which may vary by species.

== Taxonomic distribution ==
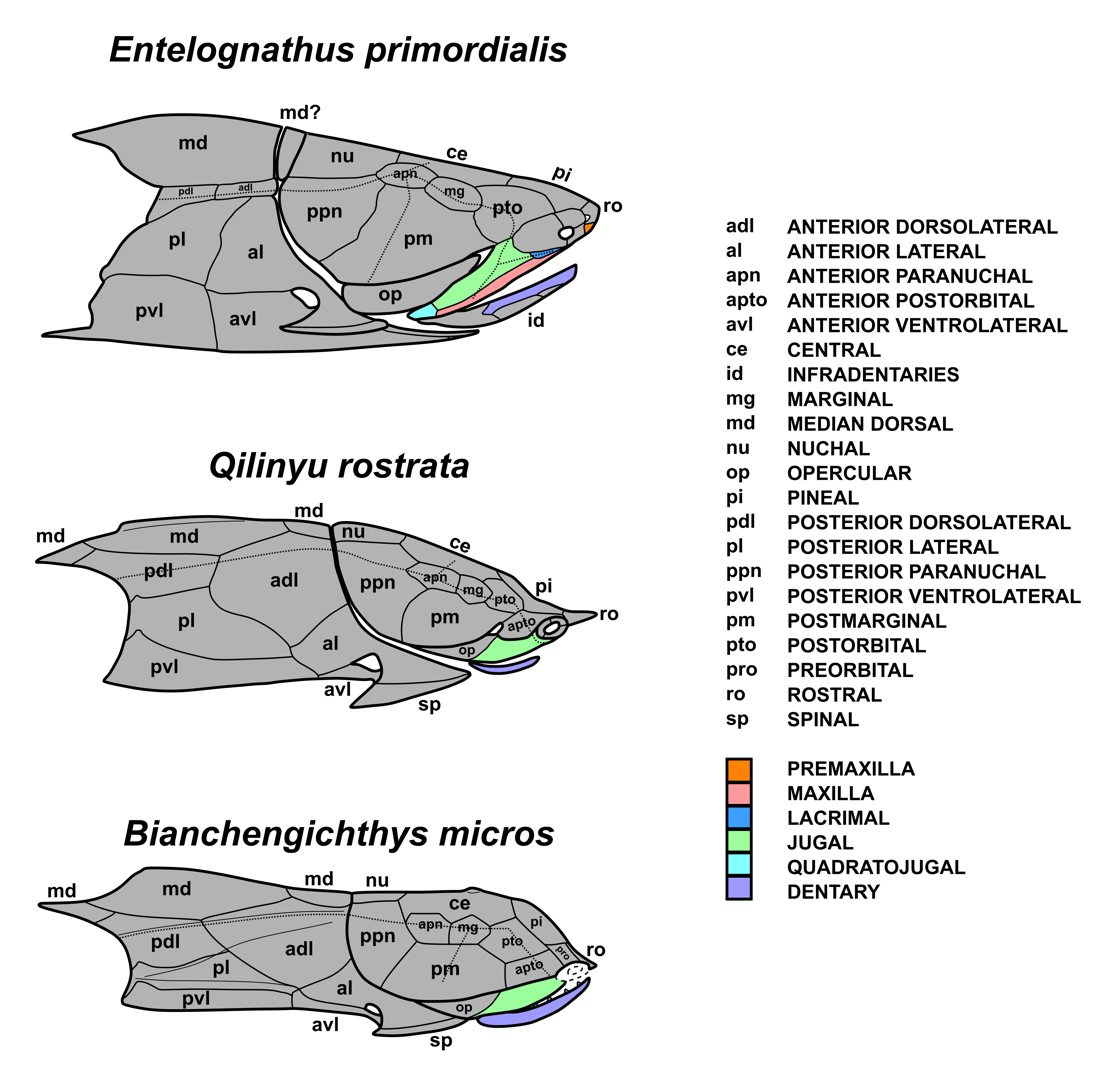
Skulls of the early jawed vertebrates Entelognathus, Qilinyu, and Bianchengichthys, with the jugal highlighted in green

The jugal is present in placoderms as the suborbital plate. Chondrichthyans have lost all dermal bone, including the jugal. In actinopterygians, there is a series of infraorbital bones below the eye, of which the third infraorbital may be the jugal. In mammals, the jugal is often called the zygomatic.

== Anatomy ==
The jugal bone is located on either side of the skull in the circumorbital region. It is the origin of several masticatory muscles in the skull. The jugal and lacrimal bones are the only two remaining from the ancestral circumorbital series: the prefrontal, postfrontal, postorbital, jugal, and lacrimal bones.

=== In dinosaurs ===
This bone is considered key in the determination of general traits in cases in which the entire skull has not been found intact (for instance, as with dinosaurs in paleontology). In some dinosaur genera the jugal also forms part of the lower margin of either the antorbital fenestra or the infratemporal fenestra, or both. Most commonly, this bone articulates with the quadratojugal, the postorbital, the lacrimal, and the maxilla. In horned dinosaurs, like Pentaceratops, the jugal bone is thick and comes to a point, which has led paleontologists to refer to it as the "jugal horn".

== Development ==
During development, the jugal bone originates from dermal bone. In at least some mammals, it forms from two ossification centers, which sometimes can remain separate into adulthood.

== Function ==
In many amniotes, the jugal borders the lower temporal fenestra. The evolution of temporal fenestrae is debated; it was traditionally thought that there were separate origins of the lower temporal fenestra in diapsids and synapsids, but the lower temporal fenestra may be a shared characteristic across amniotes.

=== In reptiles ===
The earliest reptiles primitively had a lower temporal bar (also referred to as a temporal arcade) where the posterior of the jugal bone contacts the quadratojugal. This structure has been repeatedly lost and regained in various groups.

=== In birds ===
While the jugal bone is thick and straplike in most other reptiles, the jugal bone is thin and strutlike in birds. This is thought to reduce the weight of the skull and facilitate cranial kinesis.

=== In mammals ===
Skull of stem-mammal Morganucodon, with jugal labelled

In mammals, including humans, the jugal bone is more commonly referred to as the zygoma. It assists in constructing the facial contour, protecting the eye from damage, and providing attachment sites for facial muscles. The zygoma provides important functions as the origin of the masseter muscle and as a point of resistance for masticatory forces. Preliminary studies also indicate that variation in zygomatic structure may be useful in determining ancestral origins of modern human populations.
