= Minjinia =

Minjinia Temporal range: Pragian

Scientific classification
- Domain: Eukaryota
- Kingdom: Animalia
- Phylum: Chordata
- Class: †Placodermi
- Order: †incertae sedis
- Genus: †Minjinia; Brazeau et al., 2020
- Species: †M. turgenensis

Binomial name
- †Minjinia turgenensis Brazeau et al., 2020

Extinct species of fish

Minjinia turgenensis is a species of placoderm from the Devonian of Mongolia. It is known from a single specimen preserving part of the skull, including remains of endochondral bone, which indicates that a mineralised endoskeleton evolved before the split between bony and cartilaginous fish, and that it was lost in the latter group.

Minjinia, an ancient armored fish from the Devonian period, helps scientists understand how the shoulder bones of vertebrates first developed. Researchers found evidence that its skull was connected to the shoulder in a way that suggests the shoulder bones may have evolved from parts of the gill skeleton, supporting one of the main ideas about how fish fins and shoulders first appeared.

== Classification ==
In the phylogenetic analysis ran by Brazeau et al., M. turgenensis was found as the sister taxon of a clade formed by Entelognathus, Ramirosuarezia, Janusiscus and the crown gnathostomes. A cladogram simplified from their analysis is shown below:

- - Galeaspida
  - Osteostraci
  - Gnathostomata
    - Antiarchi
    - Rhenanida
    - - Petalichthyida
      - - Ptyctodontida
        - - Arthrodira
          - - Minjinia
            - - Entelognathus
              - - Ramirosuarezia
                - - Janusiscus
                  - - Eugnathostomata
                      - Chondrichthyes
                      - Osteichthyes
