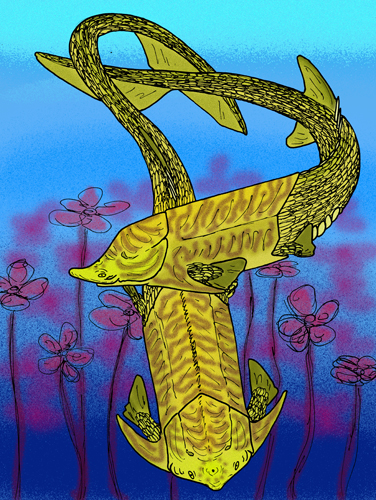
- Artist's restoration

Scientific classification
- Kingdom: Animalia
- Phylum: Chordata
- Class: †Placodermi
- Order: †incertae sedis
- Genus: †Qilinyu; Zhu et al., 2016
- Species: †Q. rostrata

Binomial name
- †Qilinyu rostrata Zhu et al., 2016

= Qilinyu =

Qilinyu Temporal range: Late Ludfordian, 423 Ma

Extinct genus of fishes

Qilinyu is a genus of early placoderm from the late Silurian (late Ludfordian stage, ~423 Ma) of China. It contains a single species, Qilinyu rostrata, from the Xiaoxiang fauna of the Kuanti Formation. Along with its contemporary Entelognathus, Qilinyu is an unusual placoderm showing some traits more similar to bony fish, such as dermal jaw bones and lobe-like fins. It can be characterized by adaptations for a benthic lifestyle, with the mouth and nostrils on the underside of the head, similar to the unrelated antiarch placoderms. The shape of the skull has been described as "dolphin-like", with a domed cranium and a short projecting rostrum.

== Discovery ==
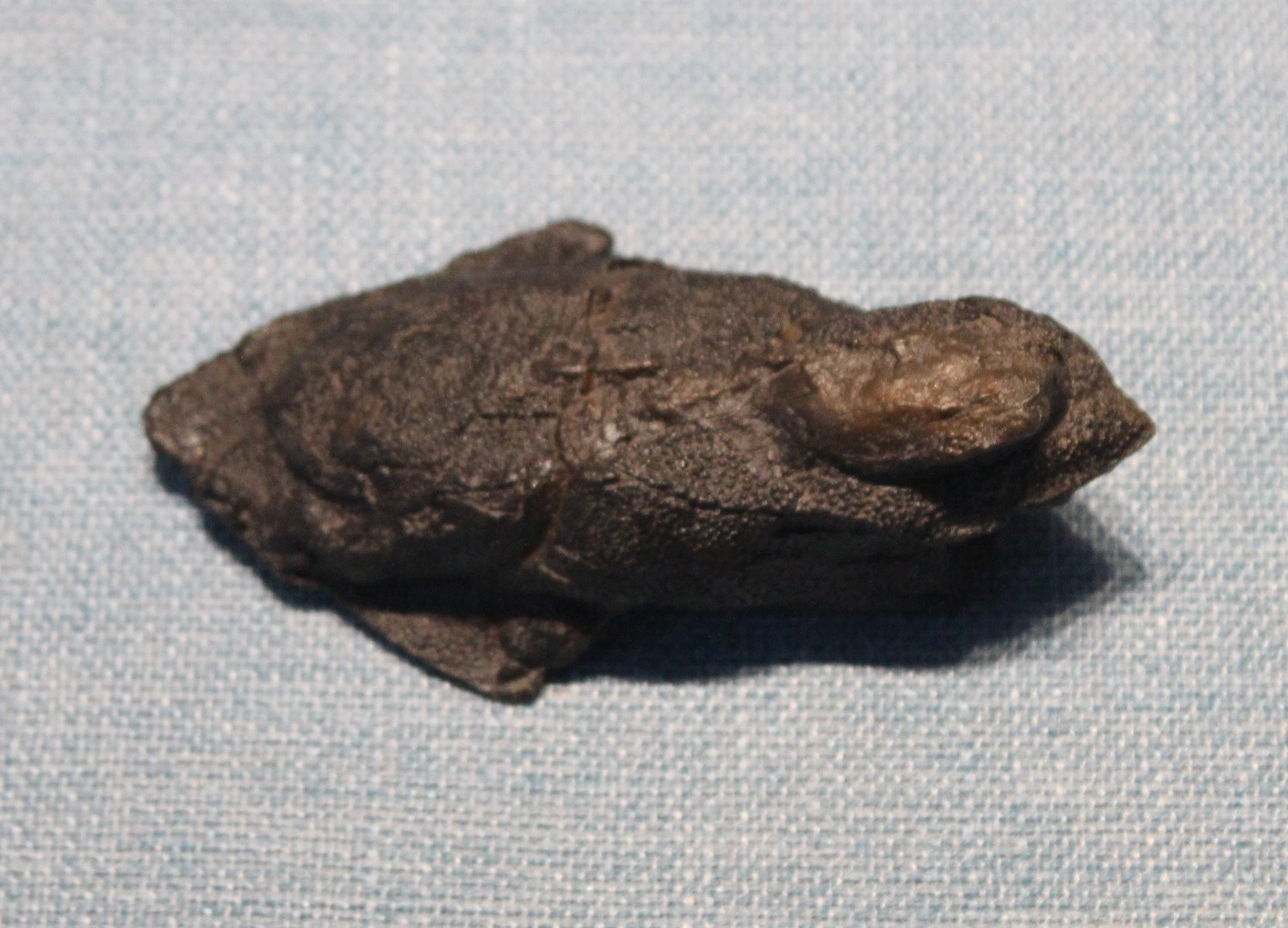
Fossil specimen, Baoding Natural History Museum

Qilinyu rostrata is based on several well-preserved specimens found in the Qilin district of Yunnan, China. The holotype specimen is the most complete, representing a set of fully articulated head and trunk armor missing only the dentaries (lower jaws). All specimens were collected from the Xiaoxiang fauna, a lagerstätte in the Kuanti Formation. Fossils of the Xiaxiang fauna were excavated over several trips from 1999 to 2016, and are now stored at the Institute of Vertebrate Paleontology and Paleoanthropology (IVPP). They include a number of ancient fish, including Entelognathus, a relative of Qilinyu described in 2013.

Conodont biostratigraphy has indicated that the fauna was deposited in the later part of the Silurian, specifically the late Ludfordian stage near the end of the Ludlow Epoch. In numerical terms, Qilinyu rostrata is about 423 million years old.

Qilinyu is named after the Qilin district, which in turn is named after the Qilin, a legendary beast in Chinese mythology. The chimeric nature of the mythological Qilin is referenced by the combination of placoderm-like and osteichthyan-like traits apparent in Qilinyu. The species name rostrata refers to the distinctive rostrum.

== Description ==
The preserved armored head and trunk region of Qilinyu measures 12.6 cm (5.0 inches) in length. Like other placoderms, the armor is separated into head armor (i.e., the bony component of the skull) and trunk armor (a complete ring of plates behind the skull). The armor is ornamented with oval-shaped tubercles.

The skull has a dolphin-like profile, with a domed forehead tapering to a short triangular rostrum (snout). The rostrum projects forwards while the jaws and nostrils are completely recessed under the head, akin to a skate or sturgeon. The orbits (eye sockets) are small, widely spaced, and shifted forwards to the base of the rostrum. A scleral ring of three bones surrounds each orbit.

=== Jaws ===
Like Entelognathus, Qilinyu can be described as a "maxillate placoderm". This means that it has three slender bones on either side of the jaw: the premaxilla at the front of the upper jaw, the maxilla at the side, and the dentary along the rim of the lower jaw. This contrasts with most other placoderms, which have gnathal plates (internal blade-like bones attaching to jaw cartilages) rather than external jaw bones. As a result, Entelognathus and Qilinyu more closely resemble osteichthyans (bony fish and tetrapods) in the structure of their jaw. There is no evidence for additional internal jaw bones such as coronoids or dermopalatines, which supplement the marginal jaw bones of bony fish.

Another difference from bony fish is that the three external jaw bones of Qilinyu are completely toothless and have an L-shaped cross-section. They have both a narrow vertical surface (facial lamina) visible externally, and a broader horizontal surface (palatal lamina) which is bent inwards at the rim of the mouth. All three bones have this condition in Qilinyu. Conversely, the dentary of Entelognathus is blade-like, and only the premaxilla and maxilla have a palatal lamina. Qilinyu also lacks infradentaries (bones at the lower edge of the jaw) or gular plates (throat armor), in contrast to Entelognathus and bony fish. This means that the dentary is the only component of the lower jaw in Qilinyu, apart from a small cartilaginous gap at the chin.

=== Head armor ===
Head and trunk armor of Qilinyu with other maxillate placoderms

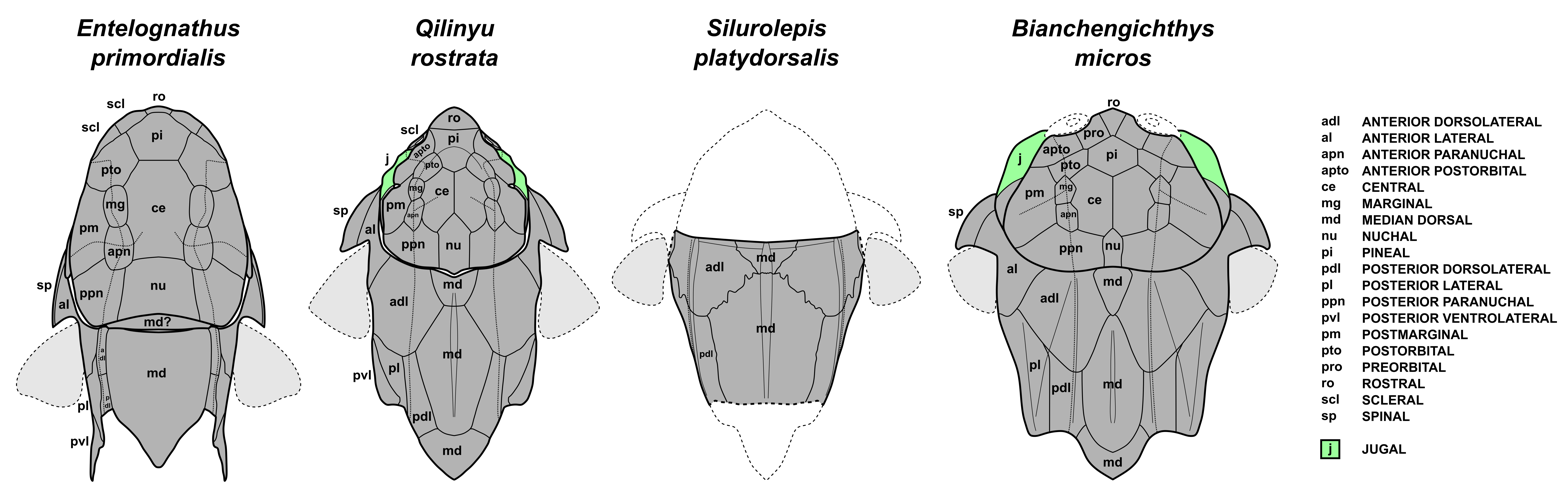
Dorsal view

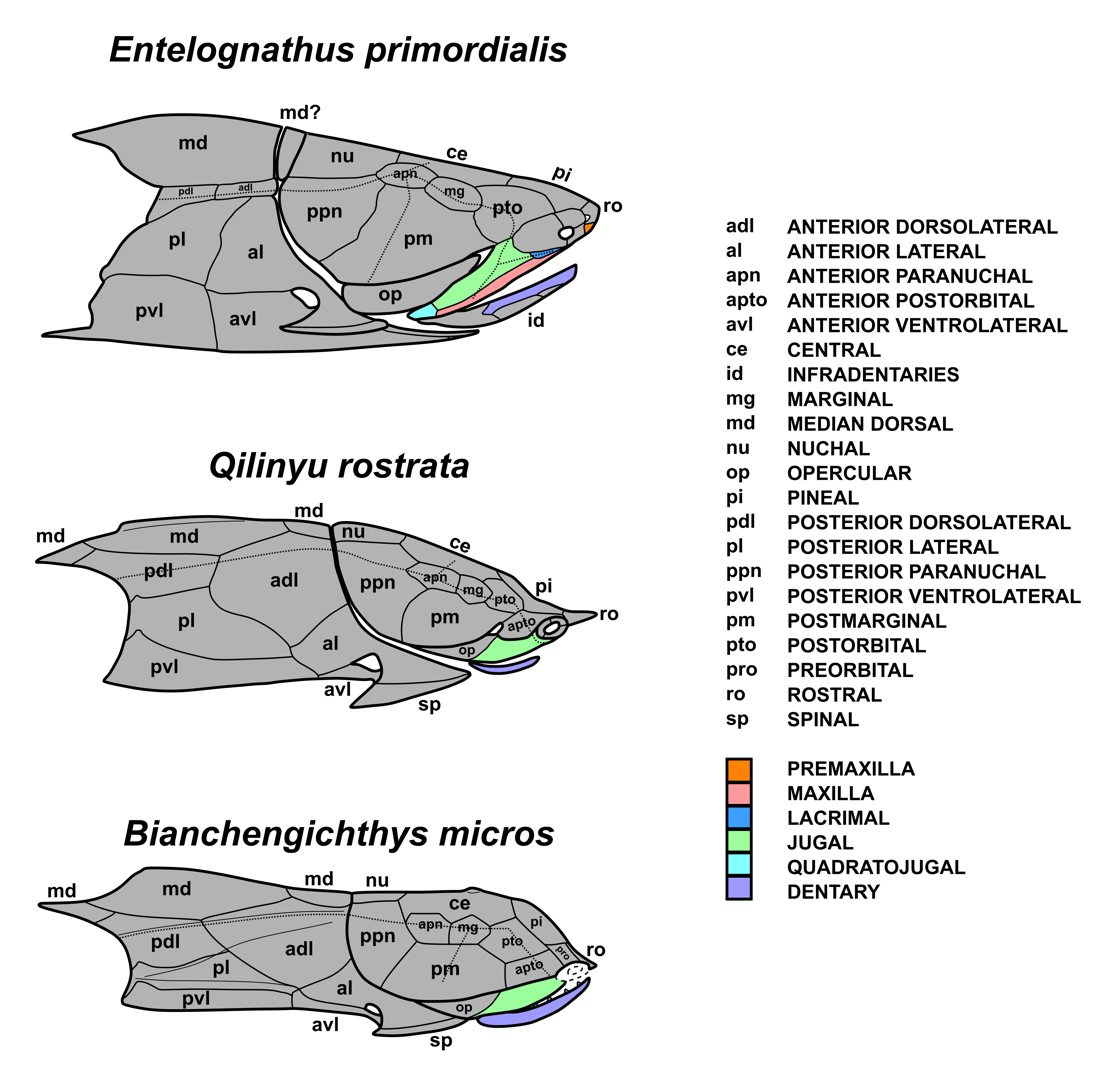
Lateral view

The upper side of the rostrum is shielded by a rostral plate, succeeded along the midline of the skull by a broadly sloping pineal plate (between the eyes), then paired central plates, and finally a narrow nuchal plate with a pointed rear tip. The underside of the rostrum is encased by the premedian plate (a large, flat, diamond-shaped bone) and small postnasal plates at the side of the nostrils. A broad groove extends from each nostril to the tip of the rostrum.

Behind the eye, the lateral surface of the skull is dominated by two bones: the anterior postorbital plate (at the front) and the postmarginal plate (at the back). The anterior postorbital plate is smaller and sends forward a slender strip of bone at the upper rim of the orbit, while the much larger postmarginal plate makes up most of the cheek region. These two plates are divided by a deep notch which presumably hosted a spiracle. The largest bones in the skulls are the posterior paranuchal plates, each of which forms the rear edge of the head armor, between the nuchal and postmarginal plates. Three fairly small elliptical bones (the postorbital, marginal, and anterior paranuchal plates) extend back in a row above the postmarginal plate. Apart from the general shape of the head, Qilinyu's head armor differs from Entelognathus in the presence of paired central plates (rather than singular), two postorbital plates on each side of the skull (rather than one), and scleral rings unfused to the skull (rather than fused). Qilinyu differs from Bianchengichthys in possessing a longer rostrum while lacking dentary denticles, a lateral line branch on the postmarginal, and a preorbital plate on either side of the rostral.

Qilinyu, Entelognathus, and bony fish all have three distinctive non-jaw bones flanking the upper jaw: the lacrimal, jugal, and opercular. In Qilinyu, the lacrimals are hidden under the rostrum and link between the equally hidden nostrils and upper jaw bones. The jugal is visible on the side of the skull, directly above the maxilla and behind the eyes. The opercular is a slender gill cover which directly attaches to the back of the jugal rather than a cartilaginous intermediary. It also has a deflected internal lamina akin to the jaw bones. In both respects, the opercular most closely resembles that of yunnanolepidid antiarchs.

The main lateral line groove extends from the postorbital straight back across the marginal and paranuchals. At its front terminus it sharply bends down as the infraorbital line groove, which passes behind the eye along the anterior postorbital and jugal. An additional lateral line groove (the posterior pitline) branches inwards from the anterior paranuchal to the central plate.

=== Trunk armor and fins ===
Like other placoderms, Qilinyu has extensive trunk armor narrowly separated from the skull. The front edge of the trunk armor closely traces the rear edge of the skull along a series of grooves and ridges, with no major gap. There are three median dorsal plates in a row along the top surface of the trunk. The second plate is hexagonal and particularly elongated, and is most likely homologous to the main median dorsal plate of other advanced placoderms. It is smoothly convex, but otherwise the trunk armor lacks sharp ridges or crests. The third plate is an enigmatic feature which may have originally been an enlarged body scale, as seen in Sigaspis. The first plate is also unusual; few other placoderms have a first median dorsal plate smaller than the second. The first plate is tentatively considered homologous to the (large) first median dorsal plate of antiarchs, as well as an unattached neck plate in Entelognathus (where it is known as a postnuchal), Sigaspsis, and Eurycaraspis (where it is known as an extrascapular). Silurolepis and Bianchengichthys are the only other placoderms with median dorsal plate proportions similar to Qilinyu.

Four plates are primarily exposed on either side of the trunk: the anterior dorsolateral (upper front), anterior lateral (lower front), posterior dorsolateral (upper rear), and posterior lateral (lower rear). Of these four, the anterior dorsolateral plate occupies the greatest area, in contrast to Silurolepis. The anterior lateral plate is irregularly shaped and expands forward. It acts as the base for a prominent blade-like spinal plate which projects outwards from the side of the body. The lateral line continues from the skull onto the dorsolateral plates. The lower surface of the trunk has two small pentagonal midline bones (the anterior and posterior median ventral plates) surrounded by two pairs of large rectangular bones (the anterior and posterior ventrolateral plates). Both ventrolateral plates form a small contribution to the side of the trunk along a bent edge, and the posterior ventrolateral plates are much larger than their anterior counterparts.

Qilinyu has a unique form of interlocking neck joint which has not been previously reported in placoderms. The front edge of each anterior dorsolateral plate hosts a U-shaped groove (the obstantic groove) edged by a pair of sharp ridges. The rear edge of the skull's posterior paranuchal plate fits into this groove, a form of articulation similar to that of antiarchs, where it is called a 'reverse ginglymoid' joint. Unlike antiarchs, the underside of the posterior paranuchal plate also has a shallow depression defined by a shelf-like ridge. This allows the lower ridge of the trunk armor to slot into the skull, similar to the 'ginglymoid' neck joint of certain arthrodires. The 'dual articulation' of Qilinyu may also be present in Silurolepis (based on its trunk armor anatomy) and Bianchengichthys (based on the external appearance of its head and trunk armor).

Qilinyu was the first maxillate placoderm to be discovered with preserved pectoral and pelvic fins. The pectoral fins fit into a broad gap excavated between the anterior lateral and anterior ventrolateral plates. The pelvic fins attach to a small isolated plate behind the trunk armor. The base of each fin is a fleshy lobe covered with small scales, though the trailing edge of the fin was presumably broad and naked.

== Classification ==
Qilinyu rostrata, together with Entelognathus, demonstrates additional evidence that modern gnathostomes evolved from placoderms.

Maximum parsimony and Bayesian phylogenetic analyses in the original description by Zhu et al. (2016) placed Q. rostrata as the sister taxon to a clade containing Entelognathus, Janusiscus, and crown-group gnathostomes (i.e., bony and cartilaginous fishes and their descendants). A redescription of Silurolepis by Zhu et al. (2019) found that Qilinyu and Silurolepis were sister taxa, though otherwise the results were the same as the earlier paper. Bianchengichthys, a maxillate placoderm described by Li et al. (2021), is also similar to Qilinyu. It occupies a polytomy with Qilinyu, Silurolepis, and crownward taxa.

Below is a cladogram showing the results of Zhu et al. (2016):

- - Galeaspida
  - Osteostraci
  - Gnathostomata
    - Antiarchi
    - Brindabellaspis
    - Romundina
    - - Jagorina
      - Gemuendina
    - - Petalichthyida
      - - - Arthrodira
          - Ptyctodontida
        - - Qilinyu
          - - Entelognathus
            - - Janusiscus
              - - - Chondrichthyes
                  - Osteichthyes

== See also ==
- Entelognathus
- Bianchengichthys
- Silurolepis
