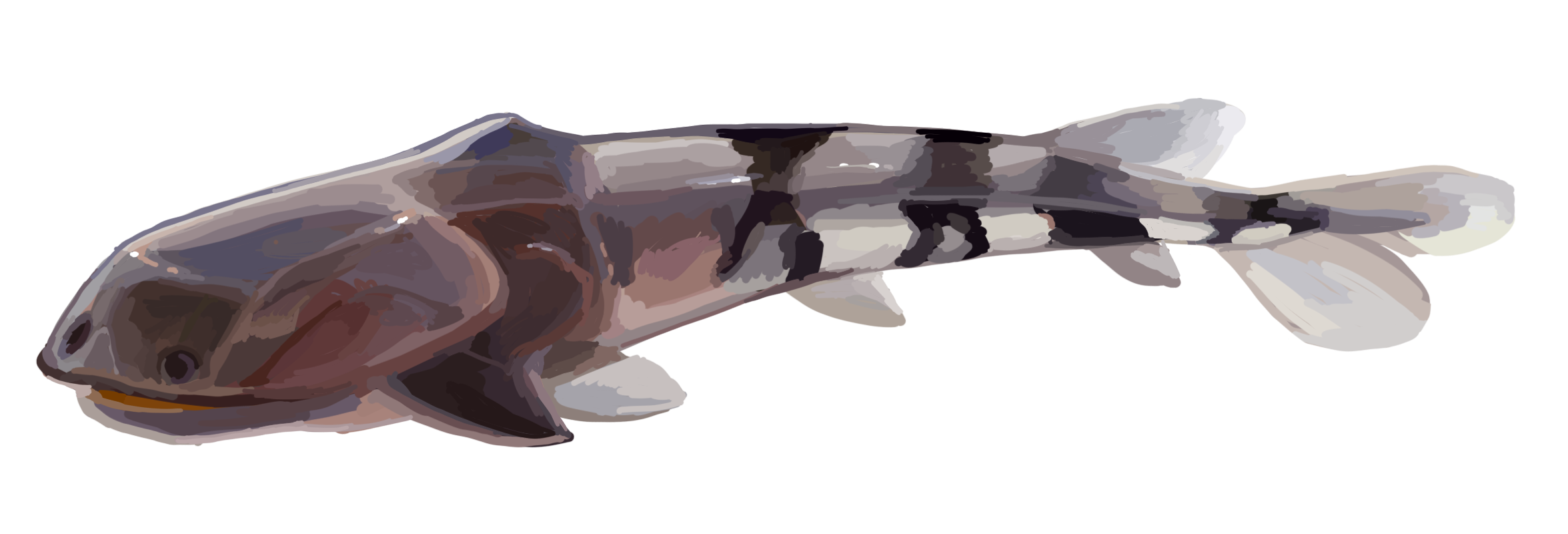
- Artist's reconstruction of B. micros

Scientific classification
- Kingdom: Animalia
- Phylum: Chordata
- Class: †Placodermi
- Genus: †Bianchengichthys
- Species: †B. micros

Binomial name
- †Bianchengichthys micros Li et al., 2021

= Bianchengichthys =

Bianchengichthys Temporal range: Ludfordian

Extinct genus of maxillate placoderm fish

Bianchengichthys is a genus of maxillate placoderm fish from the late Silurian Period. Its fossils have been recovered from Yunnan Province, China, and it is represented by only one species: Bianchengichthys micros.

== Description ==
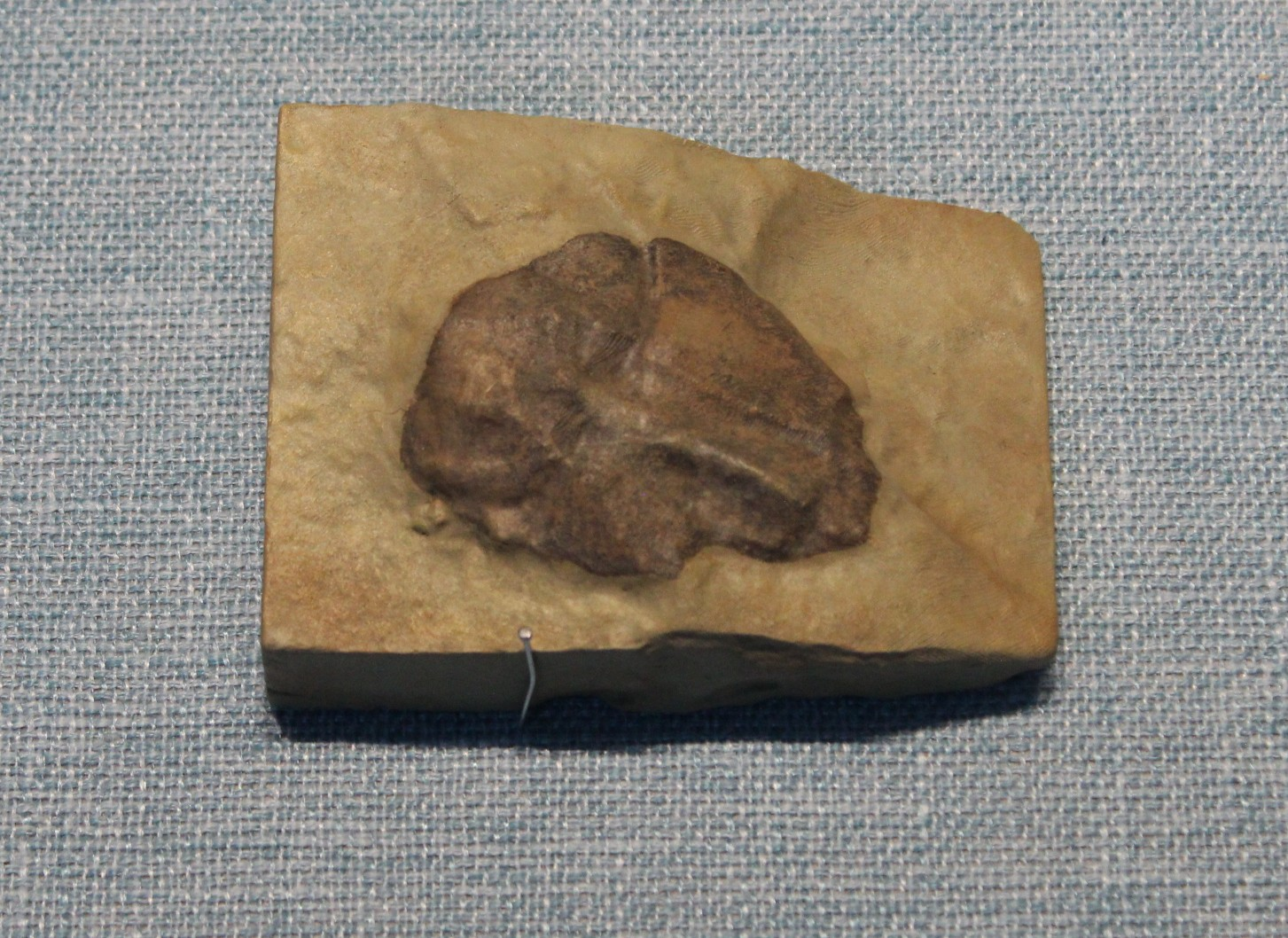
Fossil specimen, Baoding Natural History Museum

Bianchengichthys is a small, somewhat dorsoventrally compressed placoderm fish. The mandible (made from dermal bone) of this genus differs from Entelognathus and Qilinyu—two other maxillate placoderms from late Silurian China−in that the oral lamina is broad and carries a row of tooth-like denticles, though the marginal flange is toothless. The pectoral fin, preceded by two small spines on its thoracic shield, is lobate in shape and situated along by a 'fringe' of scales similar to those of Lepidotrichia in bony fishes. Similarly to other maxillate placoderms, its eyes are anteriorly orientated and very close to its mouth.

== Evolutionary significance ==
Bianchengichthys' mandible bears physical resemblance to both its relatives Qilinyu and Entelognathus as well as arthrodire placoderms. It is likely that Bianchengichthys is closely related to the common ancestor between cartilaginous fishes and bony fishes, and represents a transitionary form between placoderms and extant jawed vertebrates. The evolutionary relationships of Bianchengichthys to other placoderms is thought to shed light on the early evolution of all jawed vertebrates—for instance, its potential arthrodire affinity may suggest that eugnathostomes are an extremely derived lineage of arthrodire placoderms.

== Distribution and habitat ==
Bianchengichthys has only been reported from the Xiaoxi Formation, which is from the Ludlow Epoch (427-423 million years ago). The Xiaoxi Formation primarily consists of sandstones, siltstones and mudstones, and ichnofossil assemblages from the vicinity of Guizhou suggest that it was deposited in a shallow, subtidal, marine setting. The presence of Cruziana in the Xiaoxi suggests that Bianchengichthys may have lived alongside burrowing organisms such as trilobites. Another set of fish fossils belonging to the nomen dubium "Wangolepis" have been recovered from this layer. "Wangolepis" material has also been recovered from the Kuanti Formation, also of China's Yunnan Province.

== Gallery ==
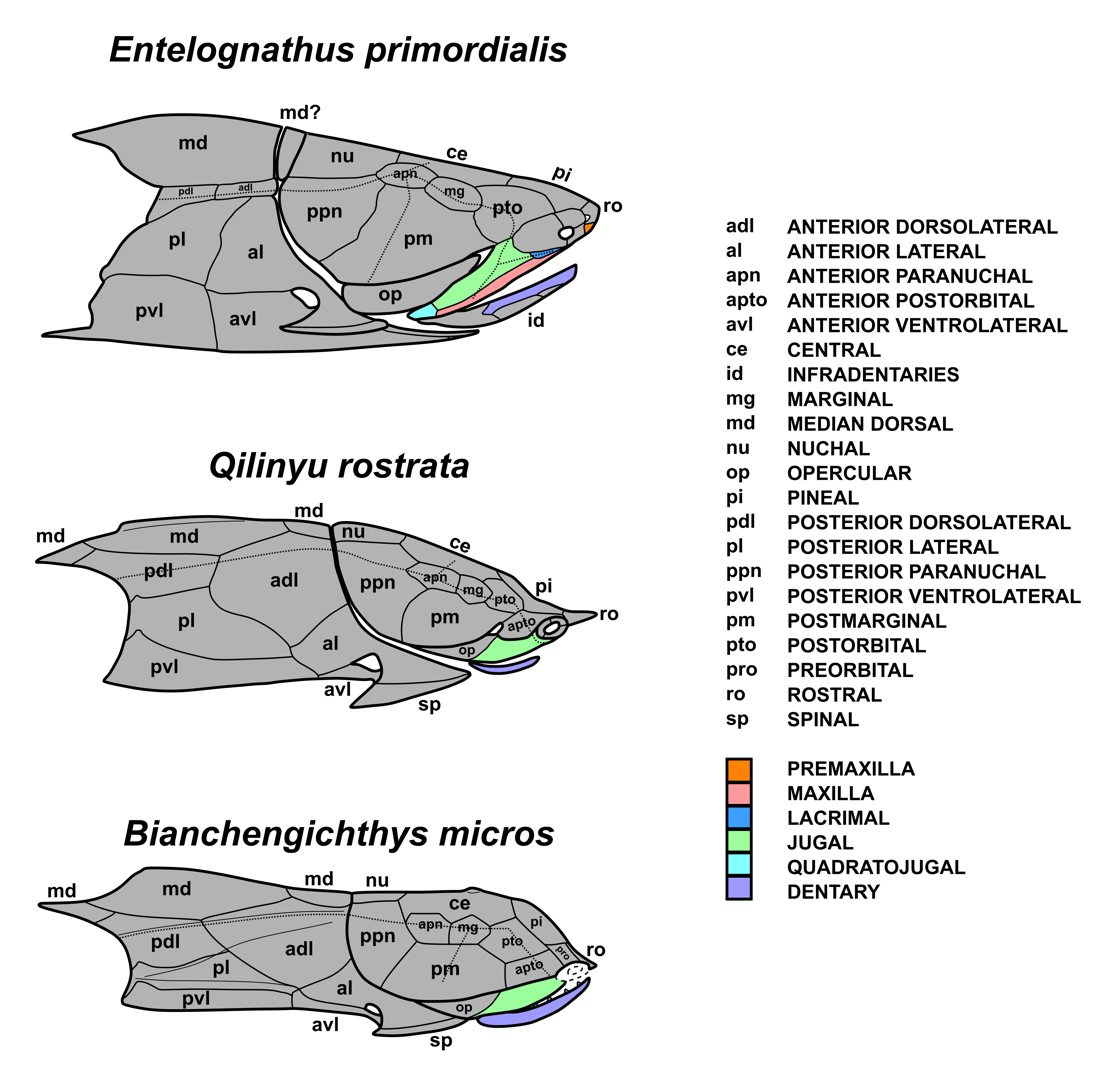
Diagram with other maxillate placoderms in lateral view

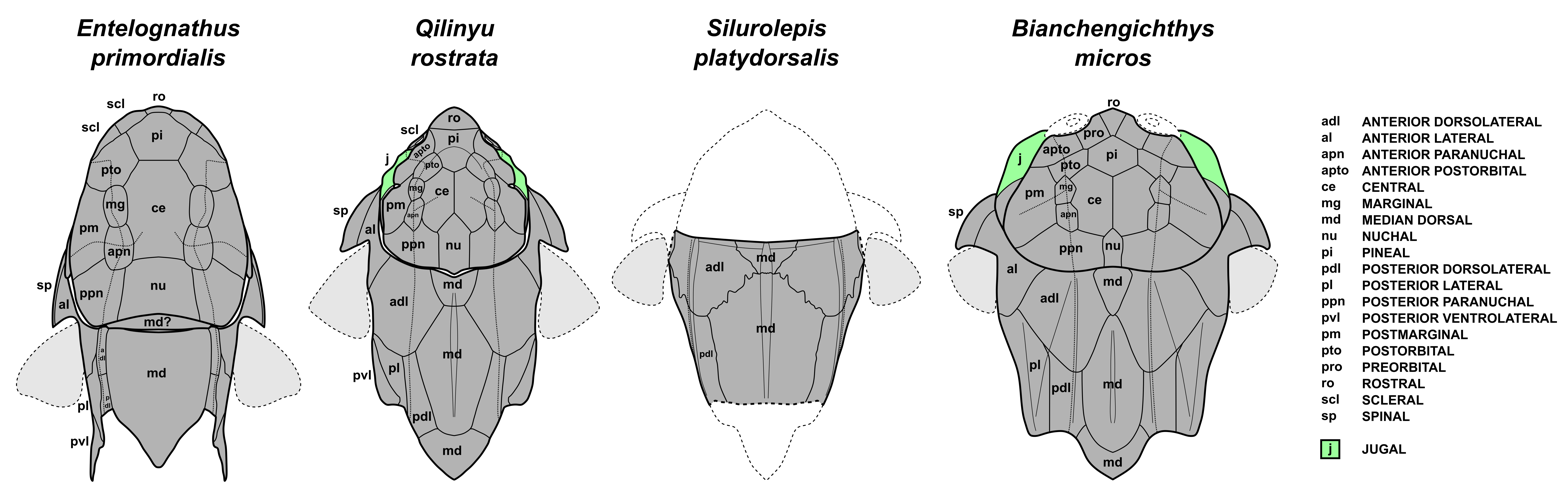
Diagram with other maxillate placoderms in dorsal view

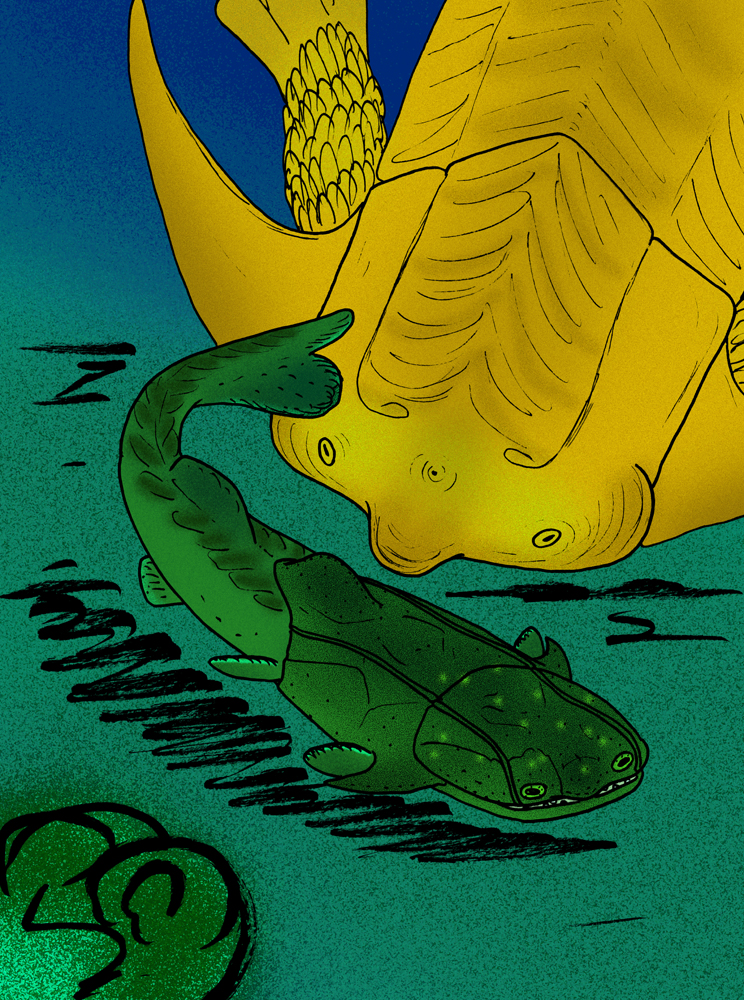
Bianchengichthys (foreground) with Qilinyu (background)

== See also ==
- Entelognathus
- Qilinyu
- Silurolepis
