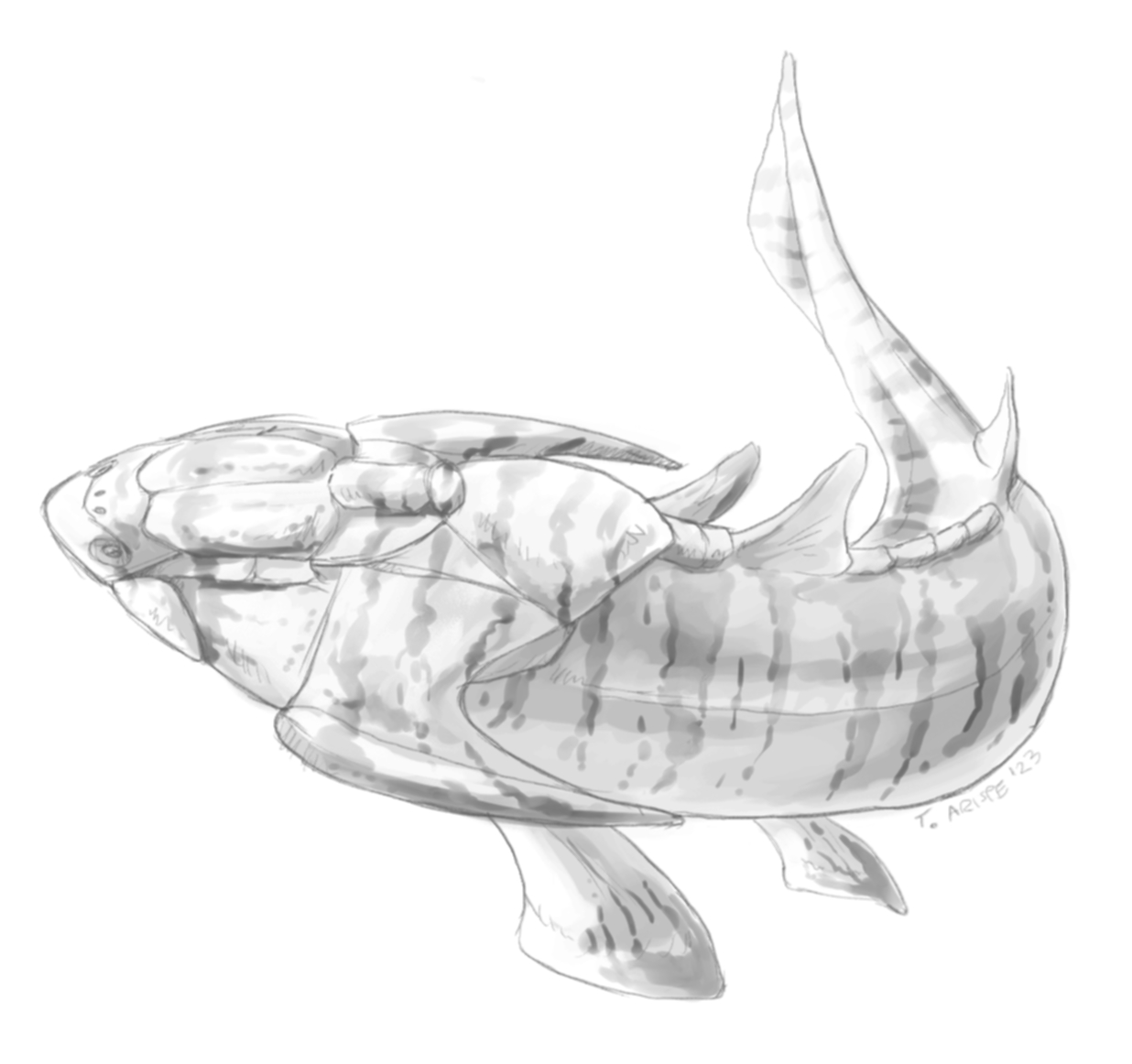
- Reconstruction of Xiushanosteus mirabilis

Scientific classification
- Kingdom: Animalia
- Phylum: Chordata
- Class: †Placodermi
- Order: †incertae sedis
- Genus: †Xiushanosteus; Zhu et al, 2022
- Species: †X. mirabilis

Binomial name
- †Xiushanosteus mirabilis Zhu et al, 2022

= Xiushanosteus =

Xiushanosteus Temporal range: Telychian

Extinct genus of placoderm

Xiushanosteus is a genus of placoderm from the Huixingshao Formation of China. It contains one species, Xiushanosteus mirabilis. It is one of the earliest known jawed vertebrates, at roughly 435 million years old. Xiushanosteus is known from around 20 specimens, most of which are complete.

== Description ==
Xiushanosteus is roughly 3 cm (1.2 in) long. Its body is dorsoventrally compressed with small, diamond-shaped scales covering it. Along its midline are scales or scutes with a linear ornament, alongside two dorsal fins of similar size, both bearing spines. The caudal fin is epicercal with a round ventral lobe. The head has long, posterolaterally directed head spines, alongside its dermoskeleton having an unusual structure with features from numerous placoderm clades.

=== Dermoskeleton ===
The margins of the skull roof are similar to acanthothoracids, however the plate pattern is closer to actinolepidoids with only one pair of postorbital and paranuchal plates. The skull roof's lateral lines are gently curving like those of "maxillate placoderms" and acanthothoracids. The nuchal plate (at the top and back of the head) does not separate the two central plates unlike in most other placoderms. The head shield resembles placoderms such as Lunaspis and Romundina closest in general shape. The trunk has two median dorsal plates and a row of scutes, with the first of the former tightly fitting into the nuchal plate therefore reducing head mobility. A trait of Xiushanosteus which no other placoderm shares is the fact that its occipital dermal plates are separated from the otic plates by a fissure, and connected to the relatively immobile trunk. This loose connection within the skull likely compensated for the low mobility between the trunk and skull.

== Etymology ==
Xiushanosteus derives from Xiushan County where the fossils were found, alongside osteus "bone", a common suffix for placoderm names. The species name mirabilis translates to "miracle" due to how unexpected the find was.
