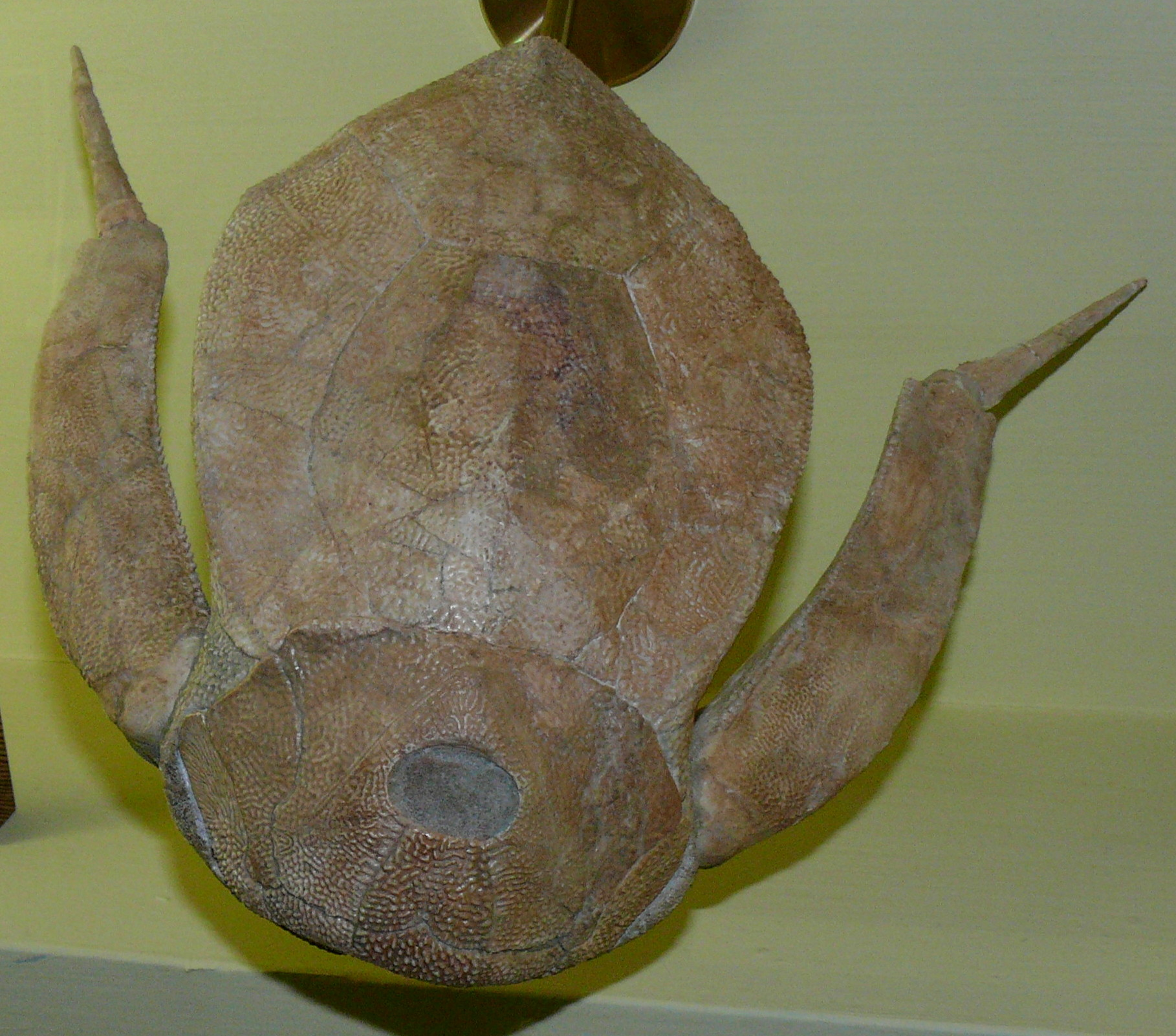
- Fossil of Bothriolepis panderi, an antiarch placoderm showing its caliper-like pectoral fins
- Life restoration of Coccosteus, an arthrodire placoderm

Scientific classification
- Kingdom: Animalia
- Phylum: Chordata
- Subphylum: Vertebrata
- Infraphylum: Gnathostomata
- Class: †Placodermi; McCoy, 1848

Groups included
- †Antiarchi; †Arthrodira (includes Phyllolepida); †Petalichthyida; †Ptyctodontida; †Rhenanida; "†Acanthothoraci"; "Maxillate placoderms"; †Qilinyu; †Entelognathus; †Silurolepis; †Bianchengichthys; †Minjinia; ?Eugnathostomata; †Xiushanosteus; †Brindabellaspis; ?†Pseudopetalichthyida; ?†Stensioella

Cladistically included but traditionally excluded taxa
- Eugnathostomata

Synonyms
- Placodermata

= Placoderm =

Placoderms Temporal range: 439–358.9 Ma Late Llandovery – Late Devonian (Note: If paraphyletic in relation to the rest of Gnathostomata, then modern jawed vertebrates represent extant forms.)

Extinct paraphyletic class of fishes

Placoderms (from Ancient Greek πλάξ [plax, plakos] 'plate' and δέρμα [derma] 'skin') are vertebrate animals of the class Placodermi, an extinct group of prehistoric fish known from Paleozoic fossils during the Silurian and the Devonian periods. While their endoskeletons are mainly cartilaginous, their head and thorax were covered by articulated armoured plates (hence the name), and the rest of the body was scaled or naked depending on the species.

Placoderms were among the first jawed fish (their jaws likely evolved from the first pair of gill arches), as well as the first vertebrates to have true teeth. They were also the first fish clade to develop pelvic fins, the second set of paired fins and the homologous precursor to hindlimbs in tetrapods. 380-million-year-old fossils of three other genera, Incisoscutum, Materpiscis and Austroptyctodus, represent the oldest known examples of live birth.

Placoderms are thought to be paraphyletic, consisting of several distinct outgroups or sister taxa to all living jawed vertebrates, which originated among their ranks. In contrast, one 2016 analysis concluded that Placodermi is likely monophyletic.

The first identifiable placoderms appear in the fossil record during the late Llandovery epoch of the early Silurian. They eventually outcompeted the previously dominant marine arthropods (e.g. eurypterids) and cephalopod molluscs (e.g. orthocones), producing some of the first and most infamous vertebrate apex predators such as Eastmanosteus, Dinichthys and the massive Dunkleosteus. Various groups of placoderms were diverse and abundant during the Devonian, but all placoderms became extinct at the end-Devonian Hangenberg event 358.9 million years ago, leaving the niches open for the osteichthyan and chondrichthyan survivors who subsequently radiated during the Carboniferous.

== Characteristics ==
Many placoderms, particularly the Rhenanida, Petalichthyida, Phyllolepida, and Antiarchi, were bottom-dwellers. In particular, the antiarchs, with their highly modified, jointed bony pectoral fins, were highly successful inhabitants of Middle-Late Devonian freshwater and shallow marine habitats, with the Middle to Late Devonian genus, Bothriolepis, known from over 100 valid species. The vast majority of placoderms were predators, many of which lived at or near the substrate. Many, primarily the arthrodires, were active, nektonic predators that dwelled in the middle to upper portions of the water column. A study of the arthrodire Compagopiscis published in 2012 concluded that placoderms (at least this particular genus) likely possessed true teeth contrary to some early studies. The teeth had well defined pulp cavities and were made of both bone and dentine. However, the tooth and jaw development were not as closely integrated as in modern gnathostomes. These teeth were likely homologous to the teeth of other gnathostomes.

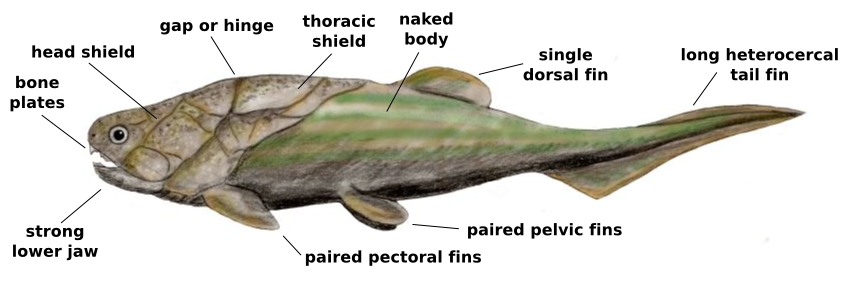
External anatomy of the placoderm Coccosteus decipiens

One of the largest known arthrodires, Dunkleosteus terrelli, was 3.5–4.1 metres (11–13 ft) long, and is presumed to have had a large distribution, as its remains have been found in Europe, North America and possibly Morocco. Some paleontologists regard it as the world's first vertebrate "superpredator", preying upon other predators. Other, smaller arthrodires, such as Fallacosteus and Rolfosteus, both of the Gogo Formation of Western Australia, had streamlined, bullet-shaped head armor, and Amazichthys, with morphology like that of other fast-swimming pelagic organisms, strongly supporting the idea that many, if not most, arthrodires were active swimmers, rather than passive ambush-hunters whose armor practically anchored them to the sea floor. Some placoderms were herbivorous, such as the Middle to Late Devonian arthrodire Holonema, and some were planktivores, such as the gigantic arthrodire Titanichthys, various members of Homostiidae, and Heterosteus.

Extraordinary evidence of internal fertilization in a placoderm was afforded by the discovery in the Gogo Formation, near Fitzroy Crossing, Kimberley, Western Australia, of a small female placoderm, about 25 cm (10 in) in length, which died in the process of giving birth to a 6 cm (2 1/2 in) offspring and was fossilized with the umbilical cord intact. The fossil, named Materpiscis attenboroughi (after scientist David Attenborough), had eggs which were fertilized internally, the mother providing nourishment to the embryo and giving birth to live young. With this discovery, the placoderm became the oldest vertebrate known to have given birth to live young ("viviparous"), pushing the date of first viviparity back some 200 million years earlier than had been previously known. Specimens of the arthrodire Incisoscutum ritchei, also from the Gogo Formation, have been found with embryos inside them indicating this group also had live bearing ability. The males reproduced by inserting a long clasper into the female. Elongated basipterygia are also found on the phyllolepid placoderms, such as Austrophyllolepis and Cowralepis, both from the Middle Devonian of Australia, suggesting that the basipterygia were used in copulation.

The placoderm claspers are not homologous with the claspers in cartilaginous fishes. The similarities between the structures has been revealed to be an example of convergent evolution. While the claspers in cartilaginous fishes are specialized parts of their paired pelvic fins that have been modified for copulation due to changes in the hox genes hoxd13, the origin of the mating organs in placoderms most likely relied on different sets of hox genes and were structures that developed further down the body as an extra and independent pair of appendages, but which during development turned into body parts used for reproduction only. Because they were not attached to the pelvic fins, as are the claspers in fish like sharks, they were much more flexible and could probably be rotated forward.

A study on Kolymaspis showcases that the vertebrate shoulder girdle evolved from gill arches.

== History of study ==
The earliest studies of placoderms were published by Louis Agassiz, in his five volumes on fossil fishes, 1833–1843. In those days, placoderms were thought to be shelled jawless fish akin to ostracoderms. Some naturalists even suggested that they were shelled invertebrates or even turtle-like vertebrates.

In the late 1920s, Dr. Erik Stensiö, at the Swedish Museum of Natural History in Stockholm, established the details of placoderm anatomy and identified them as true jawed fishes related to sharks. He took fossil specimens with well-preserved skulls and ground them away, one tenth of a millimeter at a time. After each layer had been removed, he made an imprint of the next surface in wax. Once the specimens had been completely ground away (and so destroyed), he made enlarged, three-dimensional models of the skulls to examine the anatomical details more thoroughly. Many other placoderm specialists thought that Stensiö was trying to shoehorn placoderms into a relationship with sharks; however, as more fossils were found, placoderms were accepted as a sister group of chondrichthyans.

Much later, the exquisitely preserved placoderm fossils from Gogo reef changed the picture again. They showed that placoderms shared anatomical features not only with chondrichthyans but with other gnathostome groups as well. For example, Gogo placoderms show separate bones for the nasal capsules as in gnathostomes; in both sharks and bony fish those bones are incorporated into the braincase.

Placoderms also share certain anatomical features only with the jawless osteostracans; because of this, the theory that placoderms are the sister group of chondrichthyans has been replaced by the theory that placoderms are a group of basal gnathostomes.

== Evolution and extinction ==
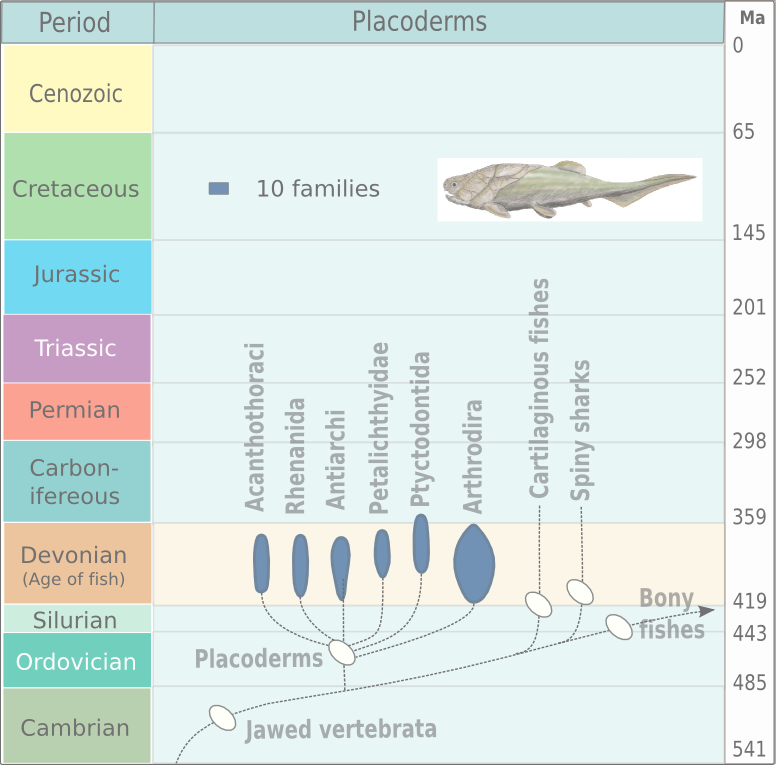
Evolution and extinction of placoderms. The diagram is based on Michael Benton, 2005.

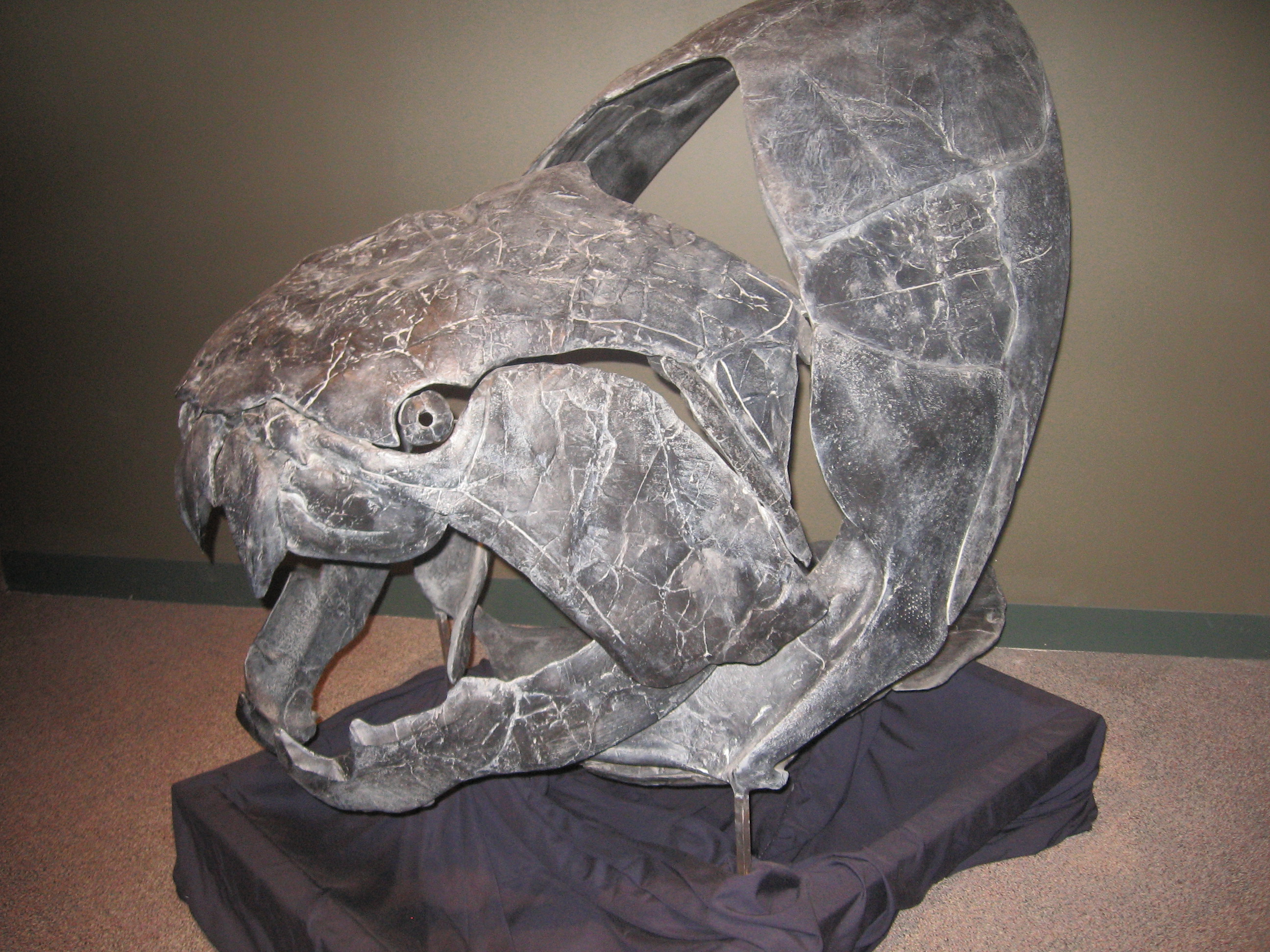
Dunkleosteus, among the first of the vertebrate apex predators, was a giant armoured placoderm predator.

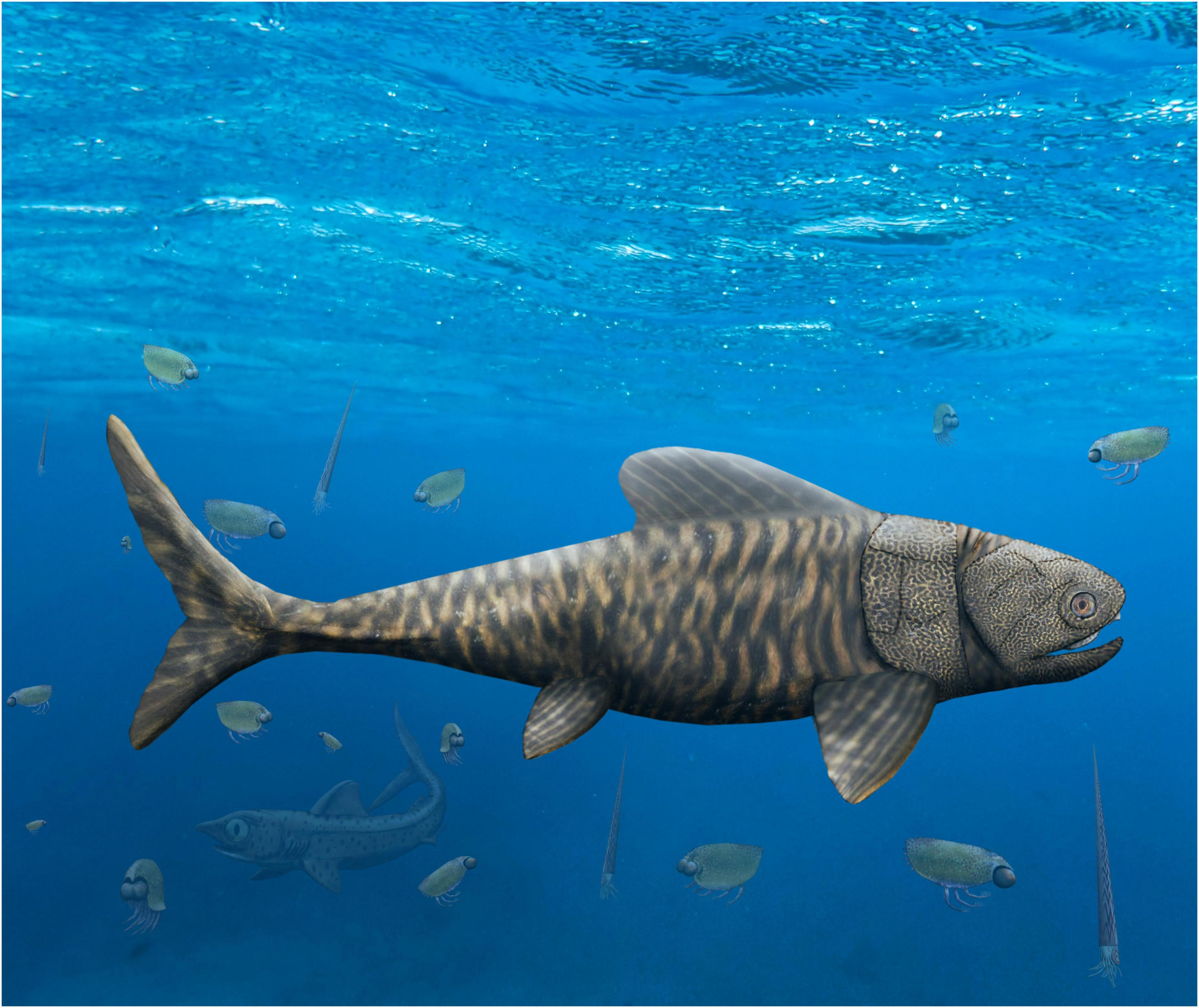
Amazichthys, a pelagic arthrodire from the Middle Famennian of the Late Devonian.

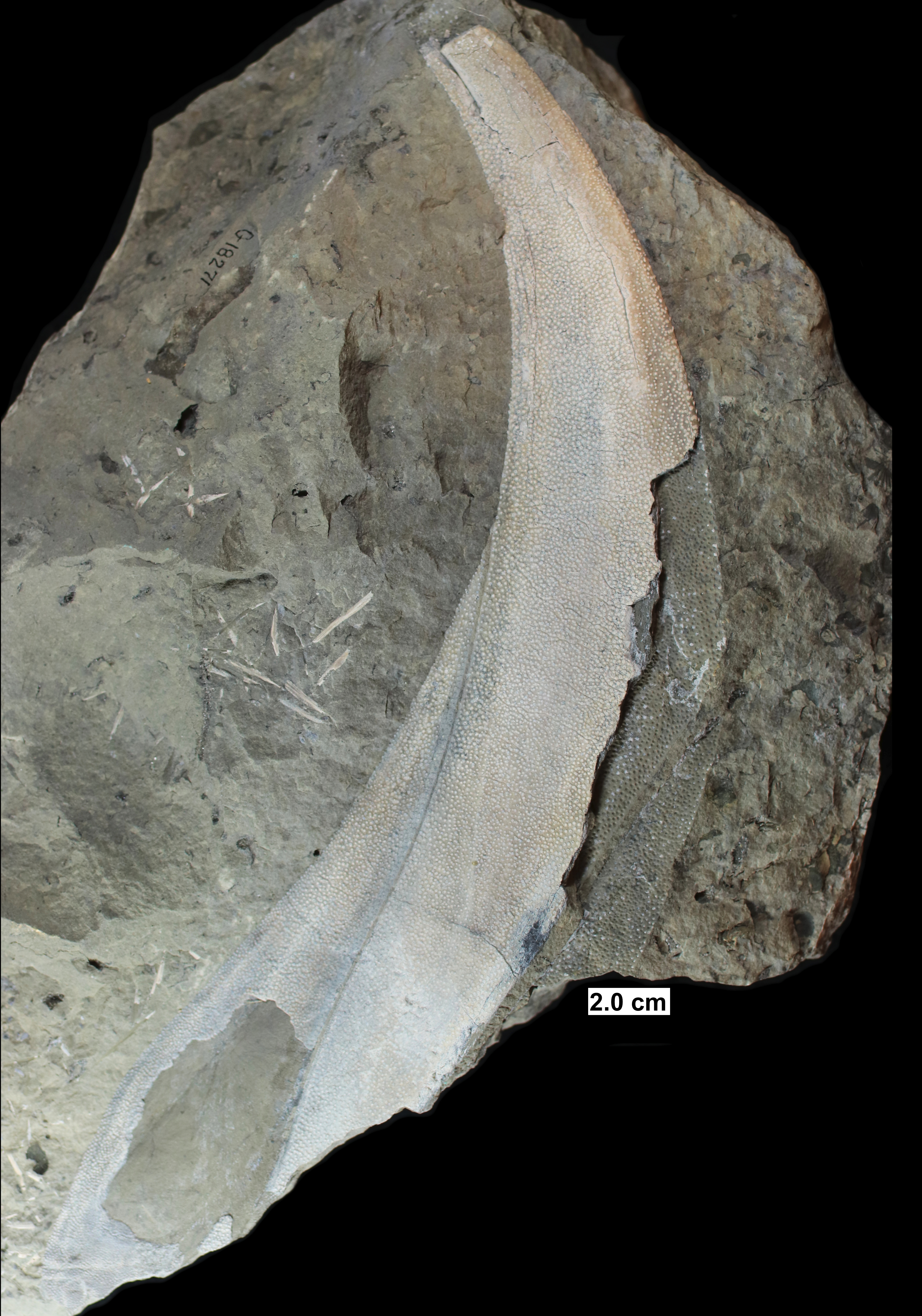
Fin spine of Eczematolepis, from the Middle Devonian of Wisconsin.

It was thought for a time that placoderms became extinct due to competition from the first bony fish and early sharks, given a combination of the supposed inherent superiority of bony fish and the presumed sluggishness of placoderms. With more accurate summaries of prehistoric organisms, it is now thought that they systematically died out as marine and freshwater ecologies suffered from the environmental catastrophes of the Late Devonian and end-Devonian extinctions.

=== Fossil record ===
The earliest identifiable placoderm fossils are of Chinese origin and date to the early Silurian. At that time, they were already differentiated into antiarchs and arthrodires, as well as other, more primitive, groups. Earlier fossils of basal placoderms have not yet been discovered.

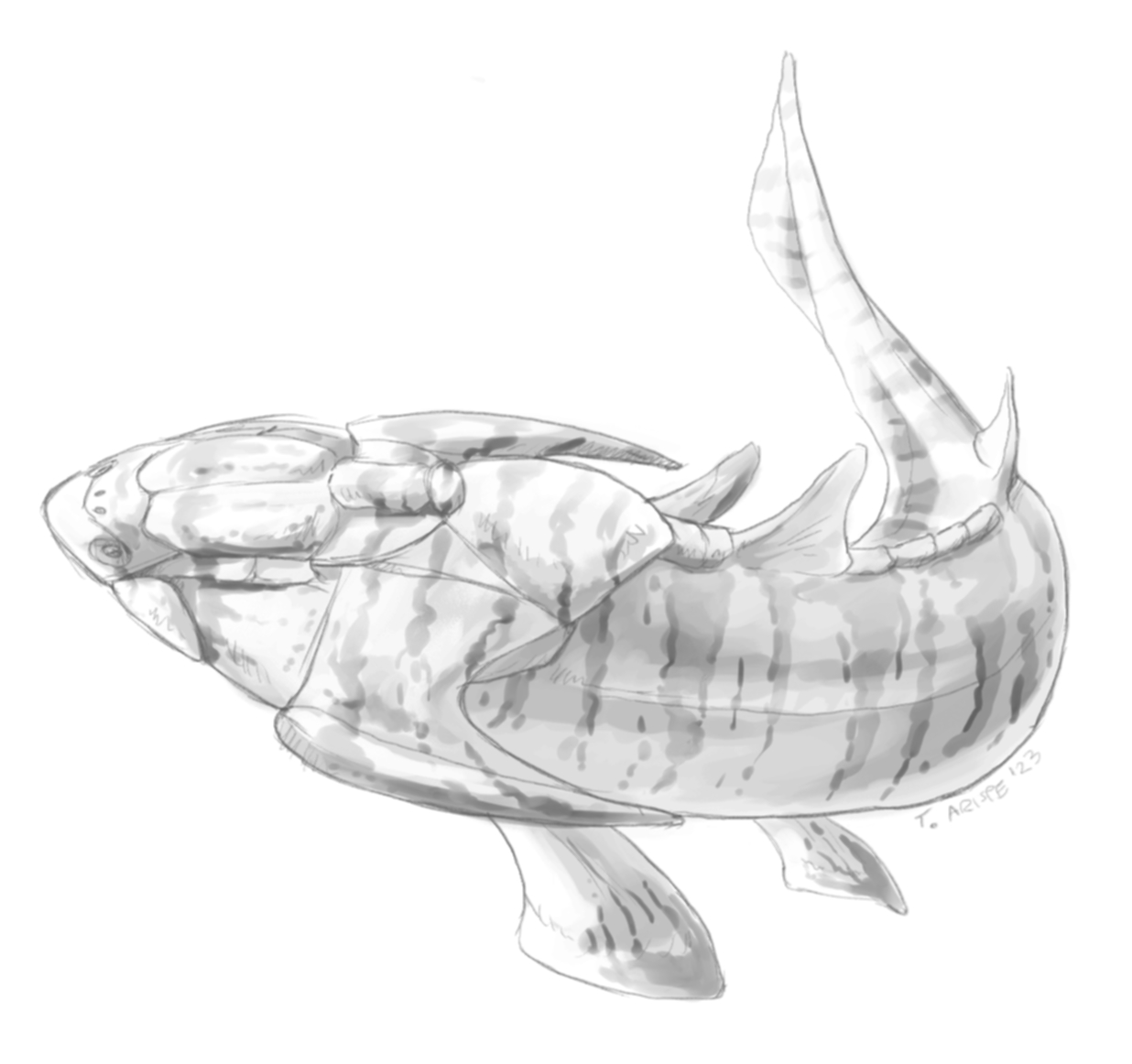
Xiushanosteus is one of the oldest known placoderms, living in what is now China during the Telychian stage of the Early Silurian.

The Silurian fossil record of the placoderms is both literally and figuratively fragmented. Until the discovery of Silurolepis (and then, the discoveries of Entelognathus and Qilinyu), Silurian-aged placoderm specimens consisted of fragments. Some of them have been tentatively identified as antiarch or arthrodire due to histological similarities; and many of them have not yet been formally described or even named. The most commonly cited example of a Silurian placoderm, Wangolepis of Silurian China and possibly Vietnam, is known only from a few fragments that currently defy attempts to place them in any of the recognized placoderm orders. So far, only three officially described Silurian placoderms are known from more than scraps:

- the basal antiarch Silurolepis, from the Ludlow epoch of Yunnan, China, known from an almost complete thoracic armor
- Entelognathus, a placoderm incertae sedis that combines features of primitive arthrodires with jaw anatomy otherwise only seen in bony fish and tetrapods.
- Qilinyu, a close relative of Entelognathus that further links Entelognathus as a transitional form between placoderms and other stem-gnathostomes and crown-group gnathostomes.

The first officially described Silurian placoderm is an antiarch, Shimenolepis, which is known from distinctively ornamented plates from Hunan, China. It was originally considered to be from the late Llandovery, although later study reconsidered its age at Ludfordian. Shimenolepis plates are very similar to the early Devonian yunnanolepid Zhanjilepis, also known from distinctively ornamented plates. In 2022, Xiushanosteus is described from complete fossils from Telychian, late Llandovery of Chongqing, China.

Paleontologists and placoderm specialists suspect that the scarcity of placoderms in the Silurian fossil record is due to placoderms' living in environments unconducive to fossil preservation, rather than a genuine scarcity. This hypothesis helps to explain the placoderms' seemingly instantaneous appearance and diversity at the very beginning of the Devonian.

During the Devonian, placoderms went on to inhabit and dominate almost all known aquatic ecosystems, both freshwater and saltwater. But this diversity ultimately suffered many casualties during the extinction event at the Frasnian–Famennian boundary, the Late Devonian extinctions. The remaining species then died out during the end-Devonian extinction; not a single placoderm species has been confirmed to have survived into the Carboniferous.

== Taxonomy and phylogeny ==
Currently, Placodermi are divided into eight recognized orders. There are two further controversial orders: One is the monotypic Stensioellida, containing the enigmatic Stensioella; the other is the equally enigmatic Pseudopetalichthyida. These orders are considered to be basal or primitive groups within Placodermi, though their precise placement within the class remains unsure. Fossils of both are currently known only from the Hunsruck lagerstatten.

=== Placoderm orders ===
==== Arthrodira ====
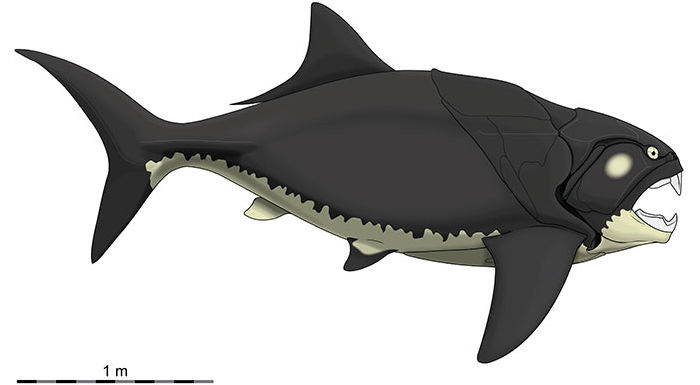
Dunkleosteus

Arthrodira ("jointed neck") were the most diverse and numerically successful of the placoderm orders, occupying roles from giant apex predators to detritus-nibbling bottom dwellers. They had a movable joint between armour surrounding the head and body. As the lower jaw moved down, the head shield moved, allowing for a larger opening. All arthrodires, save for Compagopiscis, lacked teeth, and used instead the sharpened edges of a bony plate, termed a "tooth plate", as a biting surface (Compagopiscis had true teeth in addition to tooth plates). The eye sockets are protected by a bony ring, a feature shared by birds and some ichthyosaurs. Early arthrodires, such as the genus Arctolepis, were well-armoured fishes with flattened bodies. The largest member of this group, Dunkleosteus, was a true "superpredator" of the latest Devonian period, reaching 3 to as much as 8 metres in length. In contrast, the long-nosed Rolfosteus measured just 15 cm. Fossils of Incisoscutum have been found containing unborn fetuses, indicating that arthrodires gave birth to live young.

==== Antiarchi ====
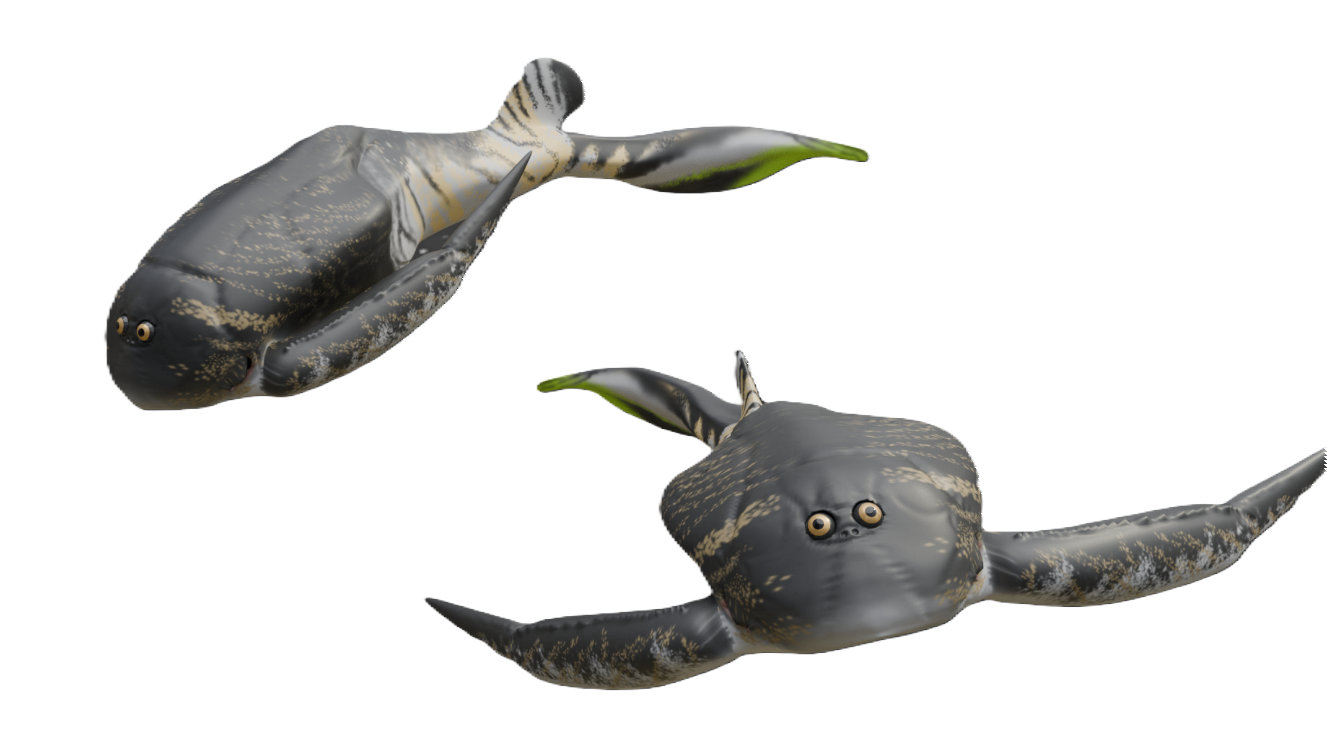
Bothriolepis canadensis

Antiarchi ("opposite anus") were the second most successful order of placoderms known, after the Arthrodira. The order's name was coined by Edward Drinker Cope, who, after incorrectly identifying the first fossils as being those of an armored tunicate, mistakenly thought the eye-hole was the mouth, and the opening for the anal siphon was on the other side of the body, as opposed to having both oral and anal siphons together at one end. The front portions of their bodies were heavily armoured, to the point of literally resembling a box with eyes, with the sometimes scaled, sometimes naked rear portions often becoming sinuous, particularly with later forms. The pair of pectoral fins were modified into a pair of caliper-like, or arthropod-like limbs. In primitive forms, such as Yunnanolepis, the limbs were thick and short, while in advanced forms, such as Bothriolepis, the limbs were long and had elbow-like joints. The function of the limbs is still not perfectly understood, but most hypothesize that they helped their owners pull themselves across the substrate, as well as allowing their owners to bury themselves into the substrate.

==== Brindabellaspida ====
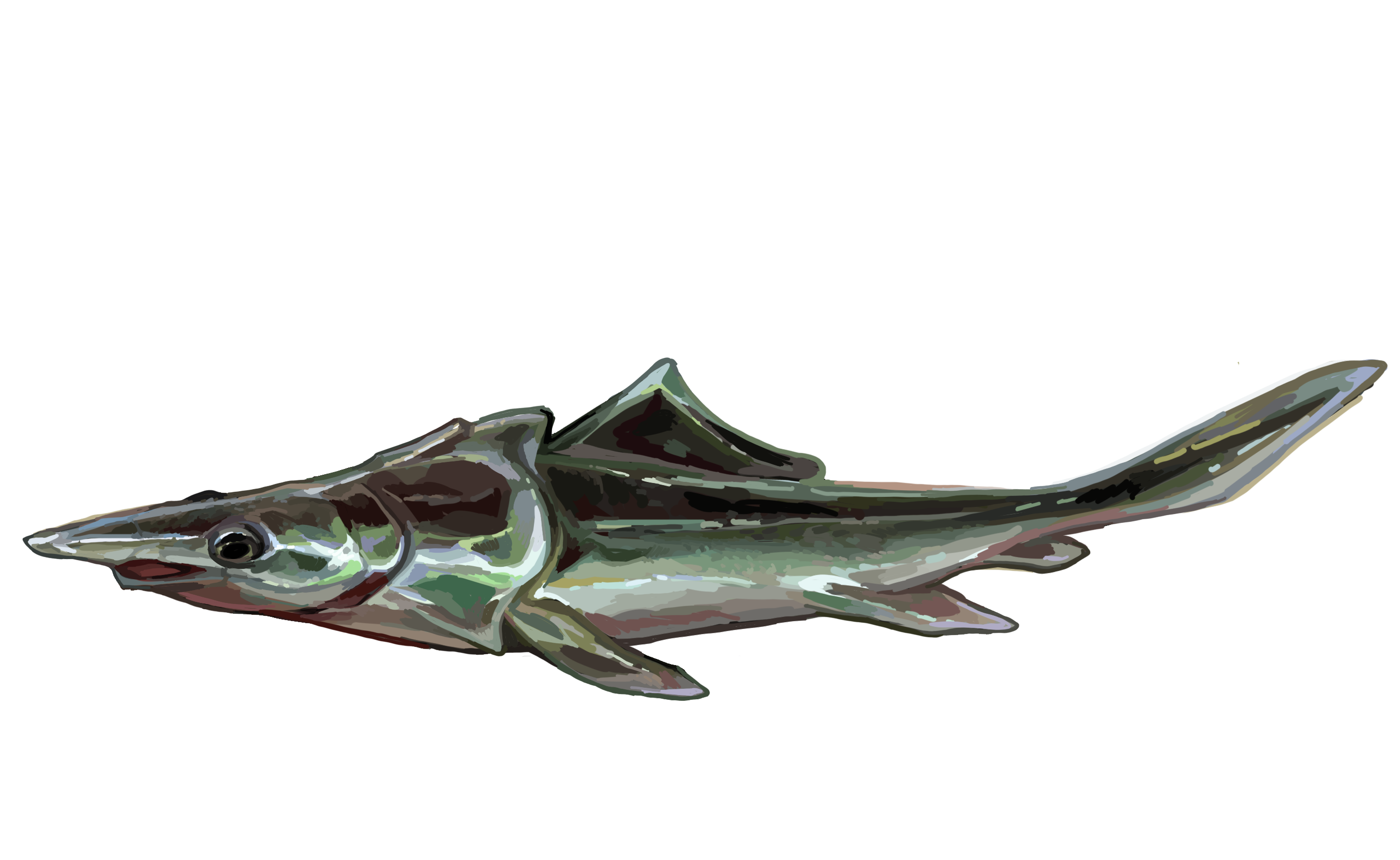
Brindabellaspis stensioi

Brindabellaspis ("Brindabella's shield") was a long-snouted placoderm from the Early Devonian. When it was first discovered in 1980, it was originally regarded as a weejasperaspid acanthothoracid due to anatomical similarities with the other species found at the same locality. According to Philippe Janvier, anatomical similarities in the brain of Brindabellaspis stensioi and the brain of a jawless fish suggest it is a basal placoderm closest to the ancestral placoderm. Various Early to Middle Devonian placoderm incertae sedis have also been inserted in the order.

==== Phyllolepida ====
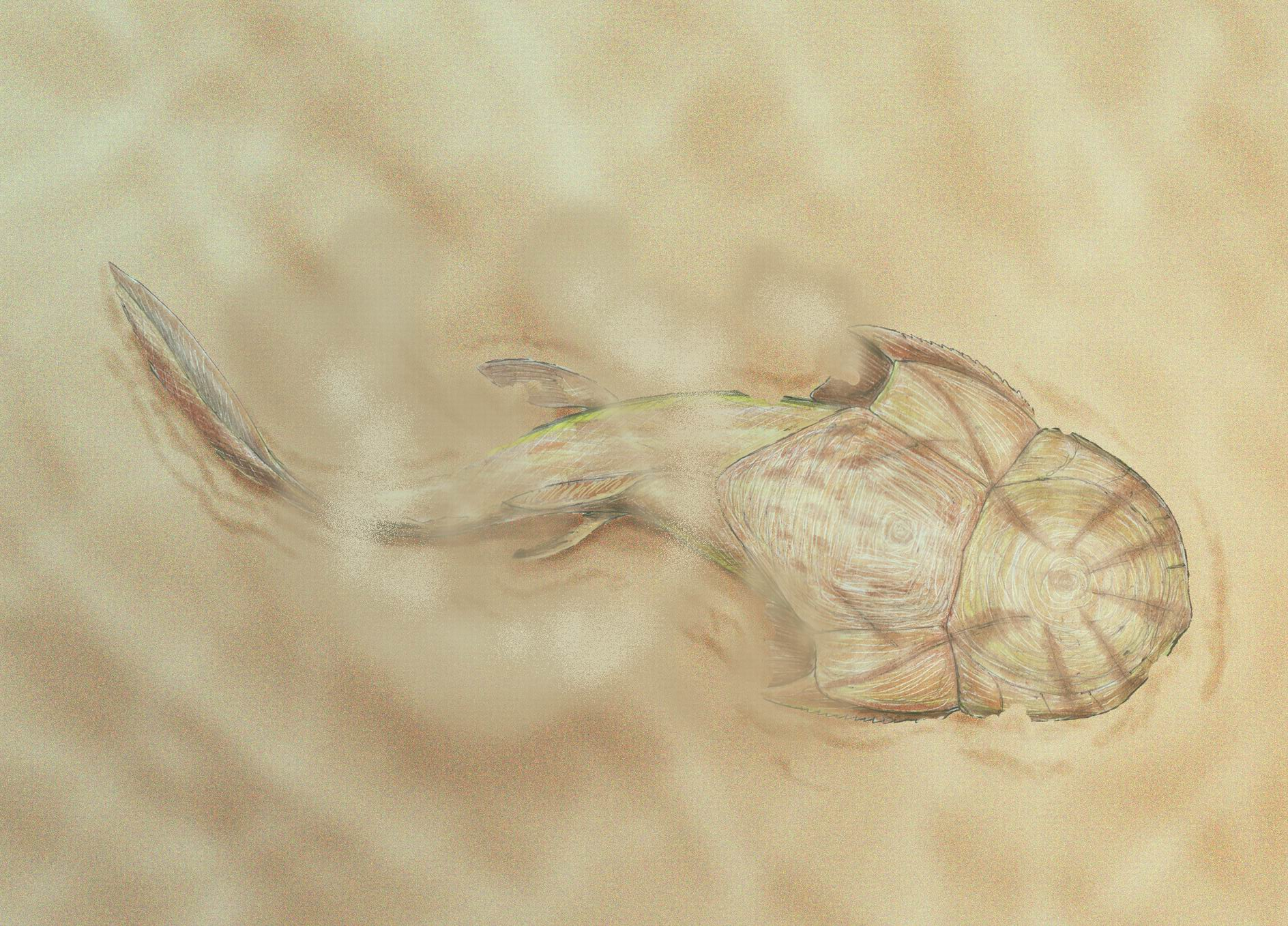
Phyllolepis orvini

Phyllolepida ("leaf scales") were flattened placoderms found throughout the world. Like other flattened placoderms they were bottom-dwelling predators that ambushed prey. Unlike other flattened placoderms, they were freshwater fish. Their armour was made of whole plates, rather than the numerous tubercles and scales of Petalichthyida. The eyes were on the sides of the head, unlike visual bottom-dwelling predators, such as stargazers or flatfish, which have eyes on the top of their head. The orbits for the eyes were extremely small, suggesting the eyes were vestigial and that the phyllolepids may have been blind.

==== Ptyctodontida ====
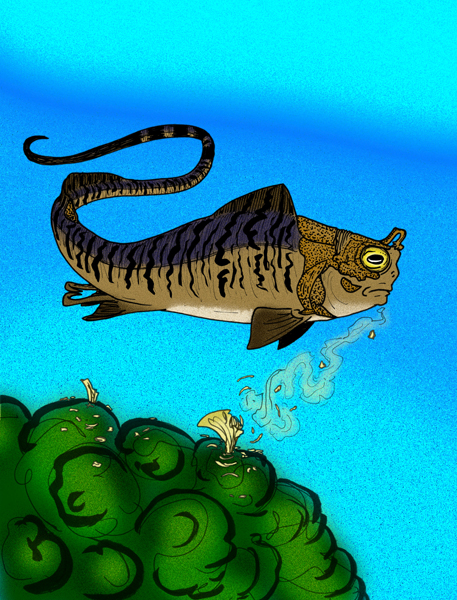
Kimbryanodus williamburyensis

Ptyctodontida ("folded teeth") were lightly armoured placoderms with big heads, big eyes and long bodies. They have a strong but superficial resemblance to modern day chimaeras. Their armour was reduced to a pattern of small plates around the head and neck. Like the extinct and related acanthothoracids, and the living and unrelated holocephalians, most of the ptyctodontids are thought to have lived near the sea bottom and preyed on shellfish. On account of their lack of armour, some paleontologists have suggested that the Ptyctodontida were not placoderms, but holocephalians or the ancestors of holocephalians. Anatomical examinations of whole fossil specimens have shown that the similarities between these two groups are superficial. The major differences were that holocephalians have shagreen on their skin, while ptyctodontids do not; the armoured plates and scales of holocephalians are made of dentine, while those of ptyctodontids are made of bone; the craniums of holocephalians are similar to sharks, while those of ptyctodontids are similar to those of other placoderms; and, most importantly, that holocephalians have true teeth, while ptyctodonts have beak-like tooth plates. Ptyctodontids were sexually dimorphic, with the males having pelvic claspers and possibly claspers on the head as well.

==== Rhenanida ====
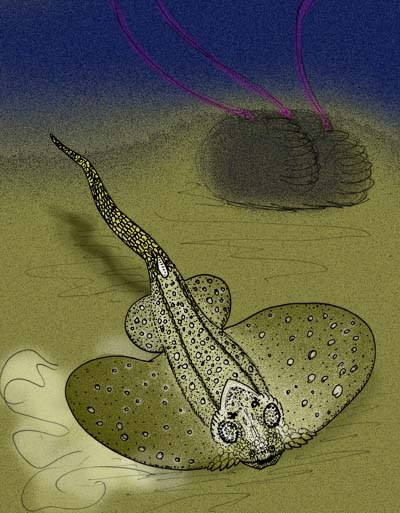
Asterosteus

Rhenanida ("Rhine fish") were flattened, ray-like, bottom-dwelling predators with large, upturned mouths that lived in marine environments. The rhenanids were once presumed to be the most primitive, or at least the closest to the ancestral placoderm, as their armour was made of unfused components—a mosaic of tubercles—as opposed to the solidified plates of "advanced" placoderms, such as antiarchs and arthrodires. However, through comparisons of skull anatomies, rhenanids are now considered to be the sister group of the antiarchs. When rhenanids die, their "mosaics" come apart, and it has been suggested that the rarity of rhenanids in the fossil record reflects postmortem disassociation, and is not an actual rarity of the species.

==== Acanthothoraci ====
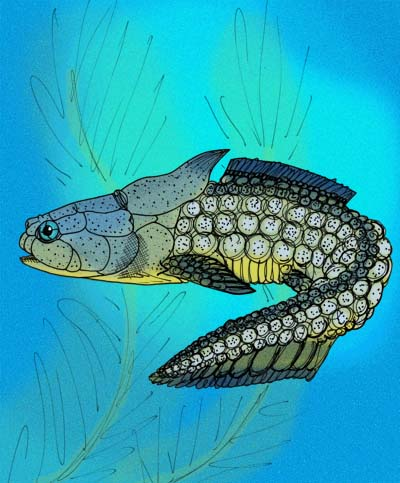
Palaeacanthaspis

Acanthothoraci ("spine chests") were a group of chimaera-like placoderms closely related to the rhenanid placoderms. Superficially, acanthoracids resembled scaly chimaeras or small, scaly arthrodires with blunt rostrums. They were distinguished from chimaeras by a pair of large spines that emanate from their chests, the presence of large scales and plates, tooth-like beak plates, and the typical bone-enhanced placoderm eyeball. They were distinguished from other placoderms due to differences in the anatomy of their skulls, and due to patterns on the skull plates and thoracic plates that are unique to this order. From what can be inferred from the mouthplates of fossil specimens, acanthothoracids were shellfish hunters ecologically similar to modern-day chimaeras. Competition with their relatives, the ptyctodont placoderms, may have been one of the main reasons for the acanthothoracids' extinction prior to the mid-Devonian extinction event.

==== Petalichthyida ====
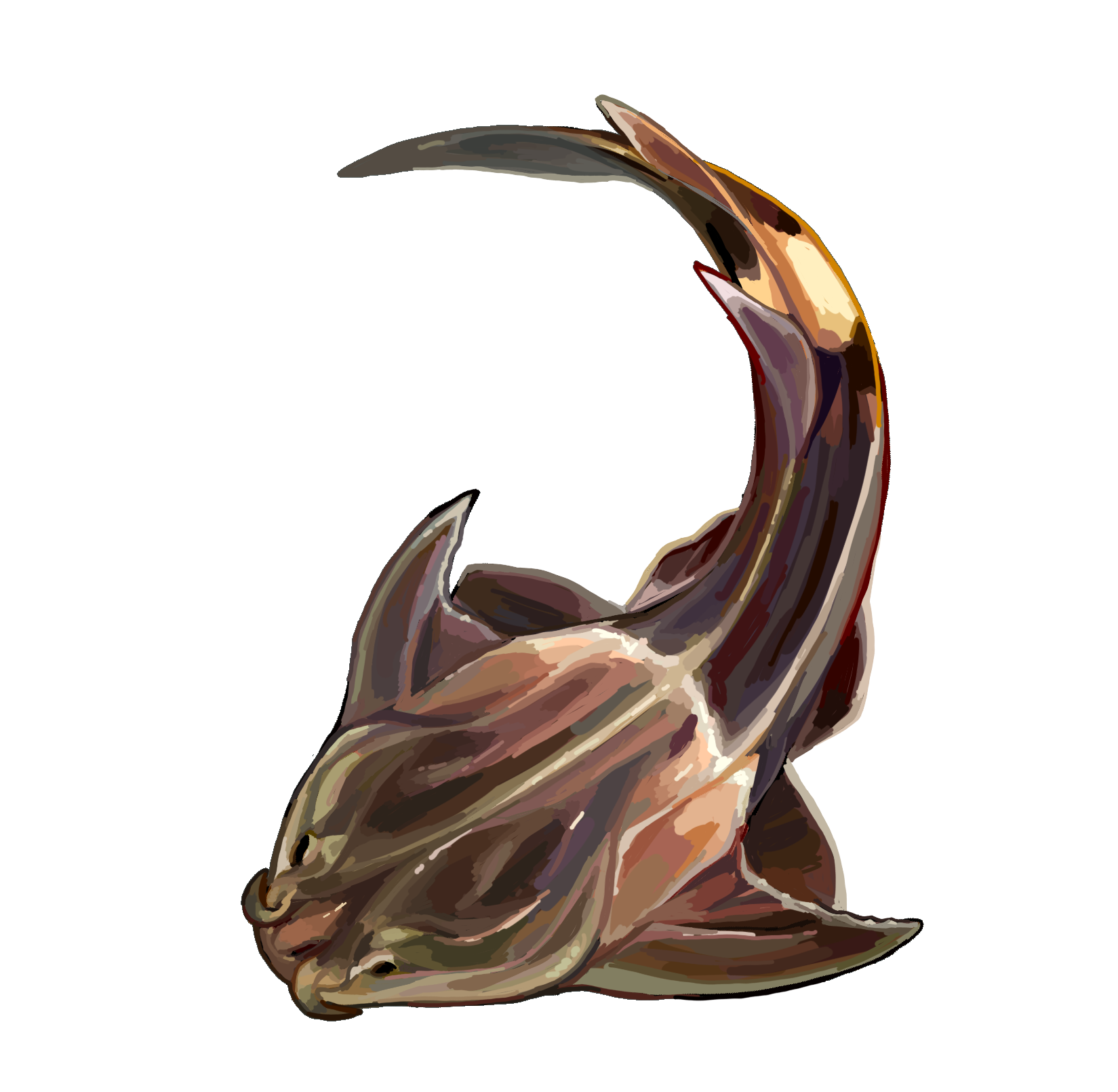
Lunaspis

Petalichthyida ("thin-plated fish") were small, flattened placoderms, typified by their splayed fins and numerous tubercles that decorated all of the plates and scales of their armour. They reached a peak in diversity during the Early Devonian and were found throughout the world. The petalichthids Lunaspis and Wijdeaspis are among the best known. There was an independent diversification event that occurred in what is now Southern China, producing a handful of unique genera that were once placed in their own order, "Quasipetalichthyida", named after the first discovered species there, Quasipetalichthys haikouensis. Soon after the petalichthids' diversification, they went into decline. Because they had compressed body forms, it is supposed they were bottom-dwellers that pursued or ambushed smaller fish. Their diet is not clear, as none of the fossil specimens found have preserved mouth parts.

==== Pseudopetalichthyida ====
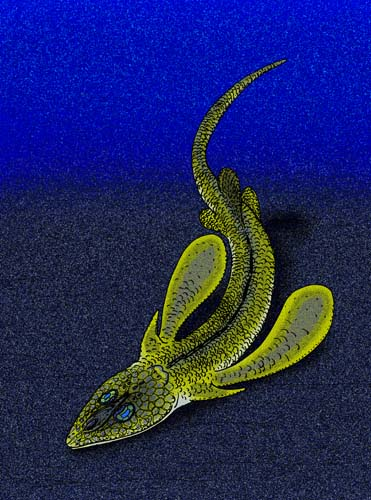
Pseudopetalicthys problematica

Pseudopetalichthyida ("false petalichthyids") is a group of elongated, possibly flattened fishes comprising three, poorly preserved and poorly studied genera. It is known only from rare fossils in Lower Devonian strata in Hunsrück, Germany. Like Stensioella heintzi, and the Rhenanida, the pseudopetalichthids had armour made up of a mosaic of tubercles. Like Stensioella heintzi, the pseudopetalichthids' placement within Placodermi is suspect. The matter is not easy to resolve because there are no complete, undamaged and articulated specimens. The anatomical studies done on the crushed specimens that have been found indicate that if they are placoderms, they may be a group more advanced than the ptyctodonts. As such, placoderm experts consider Pseudopetalichthyida to be the sister group of the Arthrodires + Phyllolepida + Antiarchi trichotomy and the Acanthothoraci + Rhenanida dichotomy.

==== Stensioellida ====
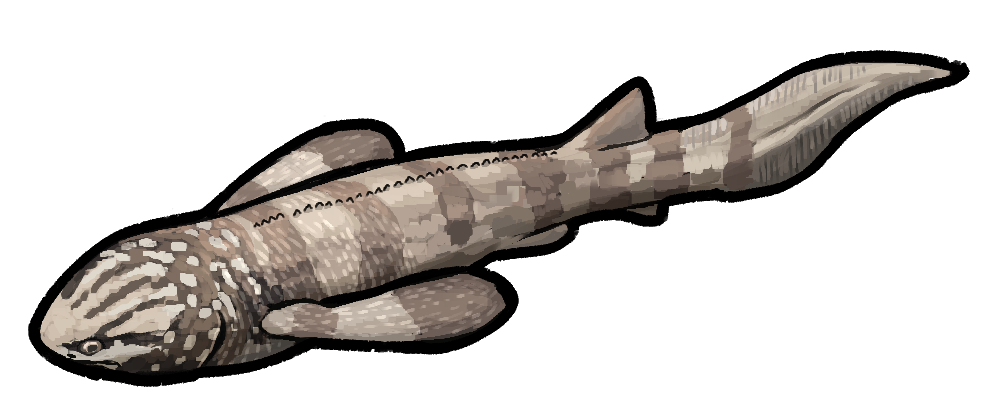
Stensioella heintzi

Stensioellida ("[Heintz's] little Stensio") contains another problematic placoderm of uncertain affinity, known only from the Lower Devonian Hunsrück slates of Germany. Stensioella was a thin fish that, when alive, looked vaguely like an elongated ratfish, or a skinny Gemuendina with thin, strap-like pectoral fins. Similar to those of the Rhenanida, its armour was a complex mosaic of small, scale-like tubercles. The shoulder joints of its armour are similar to other placoderms, and there are superficial similarities in skull plates, and even more superficial similarities between its tubercles and the tubercles of the rhenanids. It is tentatively placed within Placodermi as a primitive placoderm, though some paleontologists believe the rationale for the placement is inadequate. The paleontologist Philippe Janvier, as well as other paleontologists, has suggested that Stensioella is not a placoderm, but instead is a holocephalian. If this is true, then the holocephalians diverged from sharks before the Chondrichthyan Devonian radiation. Critics of Janvier's position say that aside from a bodyplan superficially similar to primitive holocephalians, the two groups have little else in common anatomically.

== Cladogram ==
The following cladogram shows the interrelationships of placoderms according to Carr et al. (2009):

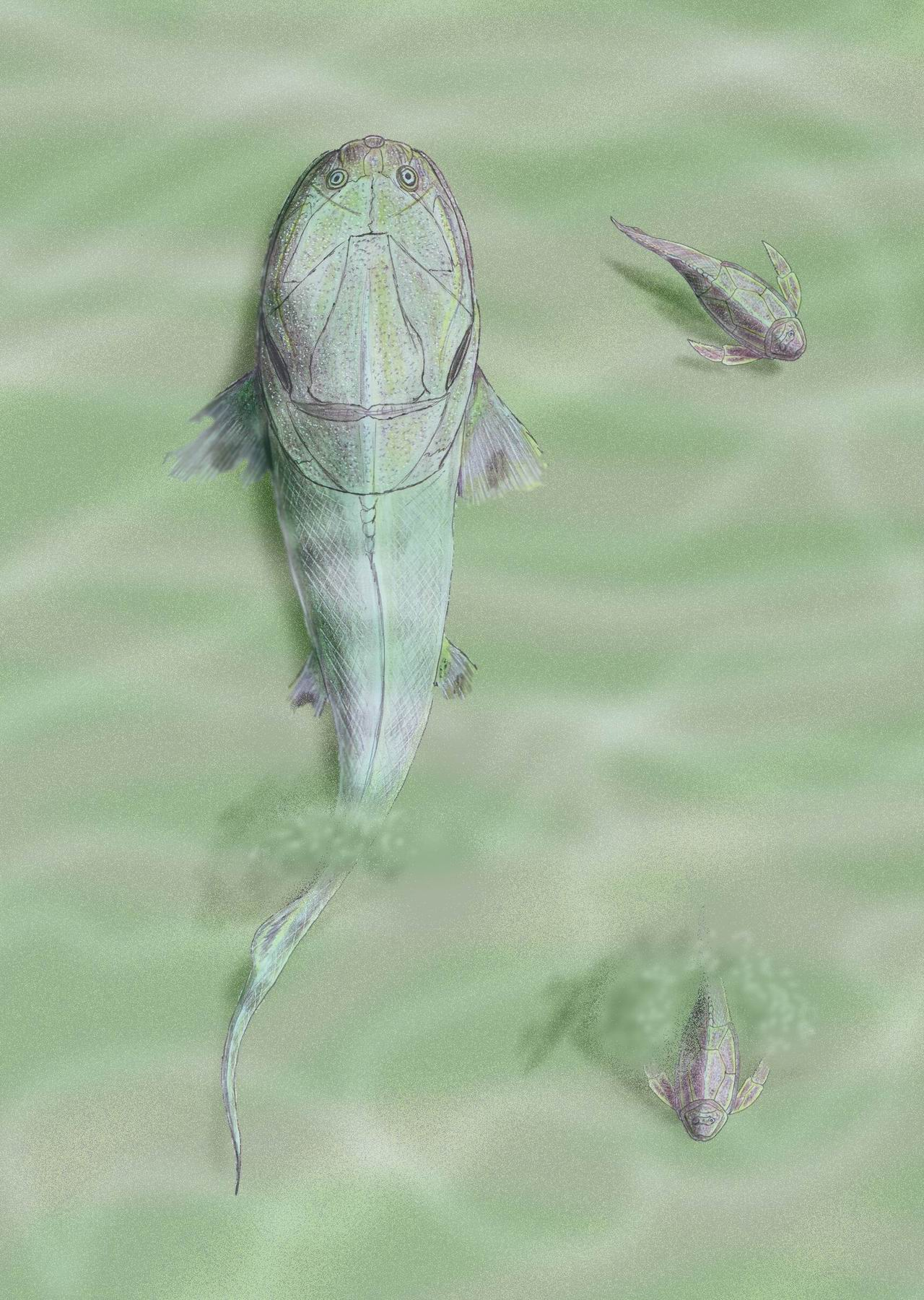
Homostius and Pterichthys

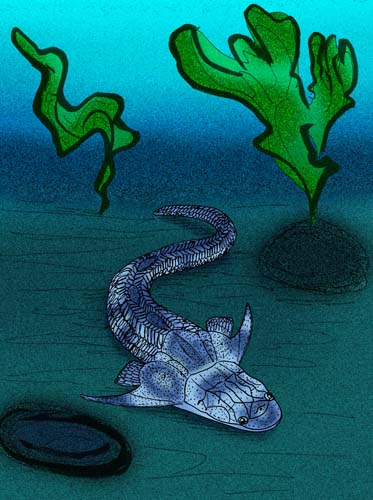
Diandongpetalichthys

- - †Stensioella
  - †Placodermi
    - †Pseudopetalichthys
    - - †Brindabellaspis
      - †Acanthothoraci
    - - †Rhenanida
      - - - †Yunnanolepis
          - †Euantiarcha
        - - - †Petalichthyida
            - †Ptyctodontida
          - †Arthrodira
            - †Wuttagoonaspis
            - †Actinolepidae
            - - †Phyllolepida
              - - †Phlyctaeniida
                - †Brachythoraci
                  - - †Holonema
                    - †Antineosteus
                    - †Buchanosteidae
                  - †Eubrachythoraci
                    - - - †Pholidosteus
                        - †Tapinosteus
                      - - †Coccosteus
                        - †Torosteus
                    - †Plourdosteus
                    - - †Dunkleosteus
                      - - †Brachyosteus
                        - †Erromenosteus
                        - †Gorgonichthys
                        - †Titanichthys

However, the cladogram has changed significantly over the years, and the placoderms are now thought to be paraphyletic, with some being more closer to the Eugnathostomata than others. The updated cladogram (Zhu et al., 2016):

- - †Osteostraci
  - †Galeaspida
  - Gnathostomata
    - †Antiarchi
    - †Brindabellaspida
      †Brindabellaspis
    - †Romundina
    - †Rhenanida
      - †Jagorina
      - †Gemuendina
    - - †Petalichthyida
      - - - †Arthrodira
          - †Ptyctodontida
        - - †Qilinyu
          - - †Entelognathus
            - - †Janusiscus
              - Eugnathostomata
                - Chondrichthyes (total group, including Acanthodii as stem lineages)
                - Osteichthyes

== See also ==
- Acanthodii
- List of placoderms
- Ostracoderm
- Chondrichthyes
- Entelognathus
