= Wangolepis =

Wangolepis Temporal range: Early Silurian

Scientific classification
- Kingdom: Animalia
- Phylum: Chordata
- Class: Placodermi
- Order: incertae sedis
- Genus: Wangolepis
- Species: Wangolepis sinensis

Wangolepis sinensis is a nomen nudum referring to as yet formally undescribed, primarily Early Silurian-aged Chinese and Vietnamese fossils of what are agreed to be a primitive placoderm.
