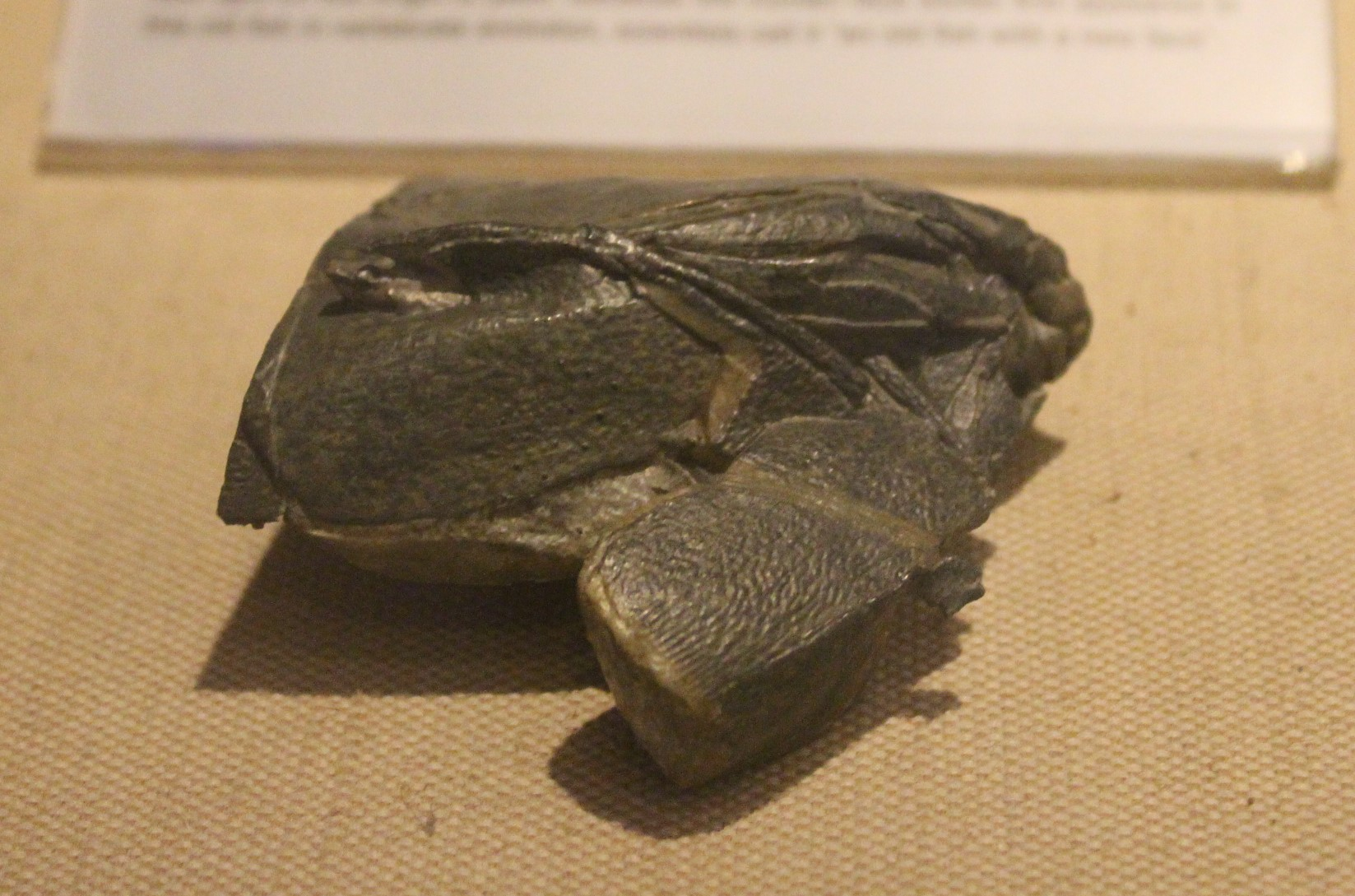
- Holotype, Paleozoological Museum of China
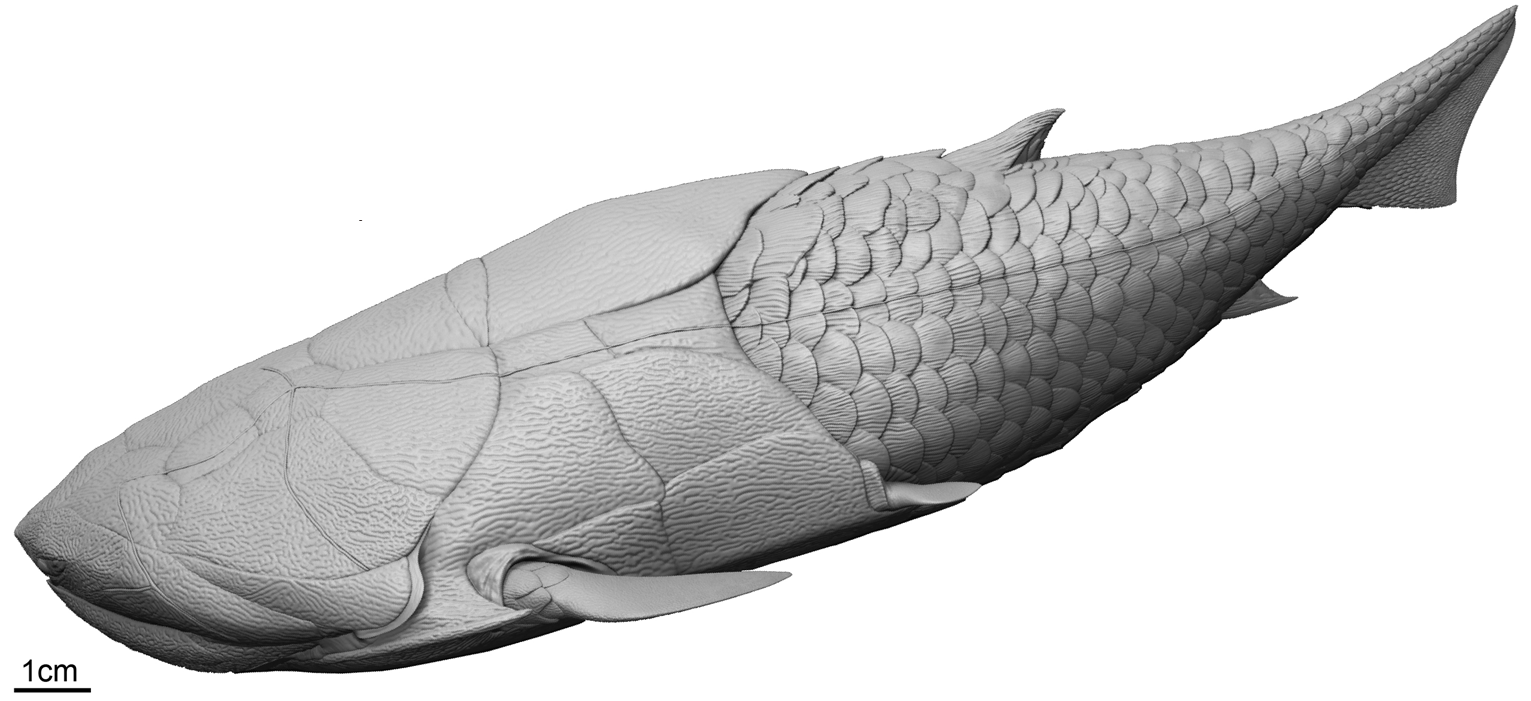
- Life reconstruction of Entelognathus primordialis

Scientific classification
- Kingdom: Animalia
- Phylum: Chordata
- Class: †Placodermi
- Order: †incertae sedis
- Genus: †Entelognathus; Zhu et al., 2013
- Species: †E. primordialis

Binomial name
- †Entelognathus primordialis Zhu et al., 2013

= Entelognathus =

Entelognathus Temporal range: 424–419 Ma Late Silurian

Placoderm fish from the late Ludlow epoch of the Silurian period

Entelognathus primordialis (“primordial complete jaw”) is an early placoderm from the late Silurian (Ludlow epoch) of Qujing, Yunnan, 419 million years ago. A team led by Min Zhu of the Academy of Sciences' Institute of Vertebrate Paleontology and Paleoanthropology in Beijing discovered the intact, articulated fossil in rock formations at Xiaoxiang reservoir.

== Specimen and taxonomy ==
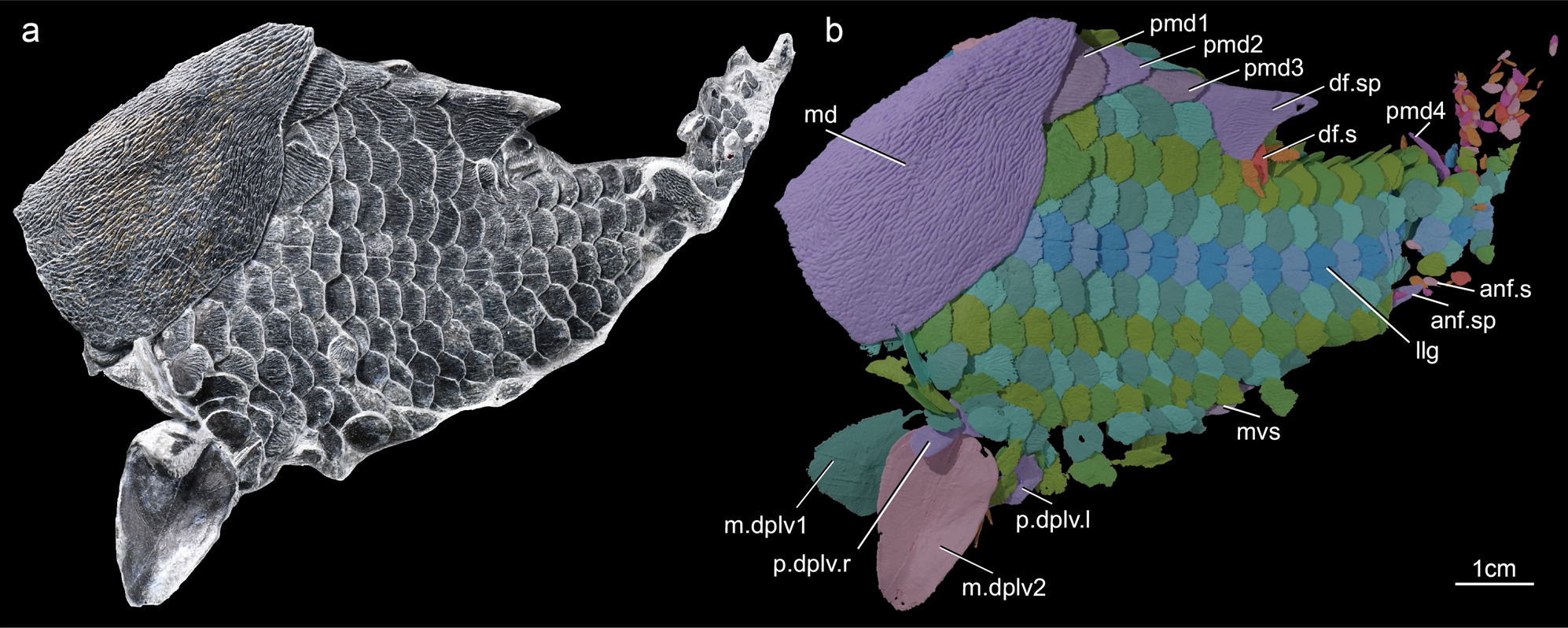
Paratype specimen IVPP V32322 with scales and fin spines preserved

The holotype of E. primordialis is the uncrushed and mostly intact anterior half of an individual with the articulating head and trunk armor preserved in three dimensions. The holotype is about 11 centimetres (4.3 in) long, and the live animal is estimated to have been over 20 cm (8 in) long. In overall form, the animal resembles primitive arthrodires, but the anatomy of the jaws strongly suggests the anatomies of bony fish and tetrapods. Specifically, this is the first stem gnathostome with dermal marginal jaw bones. These bones are the premaxilla, maxilla, and dentary. Most known placoderms had simple beak-like jaws made of bone plates. In 2023, newly described articulated specimen is shown, which have preserved large scales some of which are rhomboid, and fin spines on dorsal and anal fins (the latter of which was a trait that was previously only found in stem-group chondrichthyes).

The researchers' cladistic diagram suggests that E. primordialis forms a polytomy with arthrodires, ptyctodonts, and all advanced gnathostomes (namely bony fish, tetrapods, acanthodians, and chondrichthyes).

== Etymology ==
The generic name translates as "complete jaw", referring to how the animal had a complete set of dermal marginal jaw bones. The specific name translates as "primordial".

== Evolutionary significance ==
Prior to the discovery of Entelognathus, scientists assumed that the last common ancestor of jawed vertebrates was a shark-like animal, with no distinct jawbones, and that modern jaws evolved in early bony fishes. This discovery shows that modern jaws evolved earlier. It is possible that Chondrichthyes started with distinct jaws and then dispensed with them. This has been called the earliest known animal with what looks like a face.

== Gallery ==
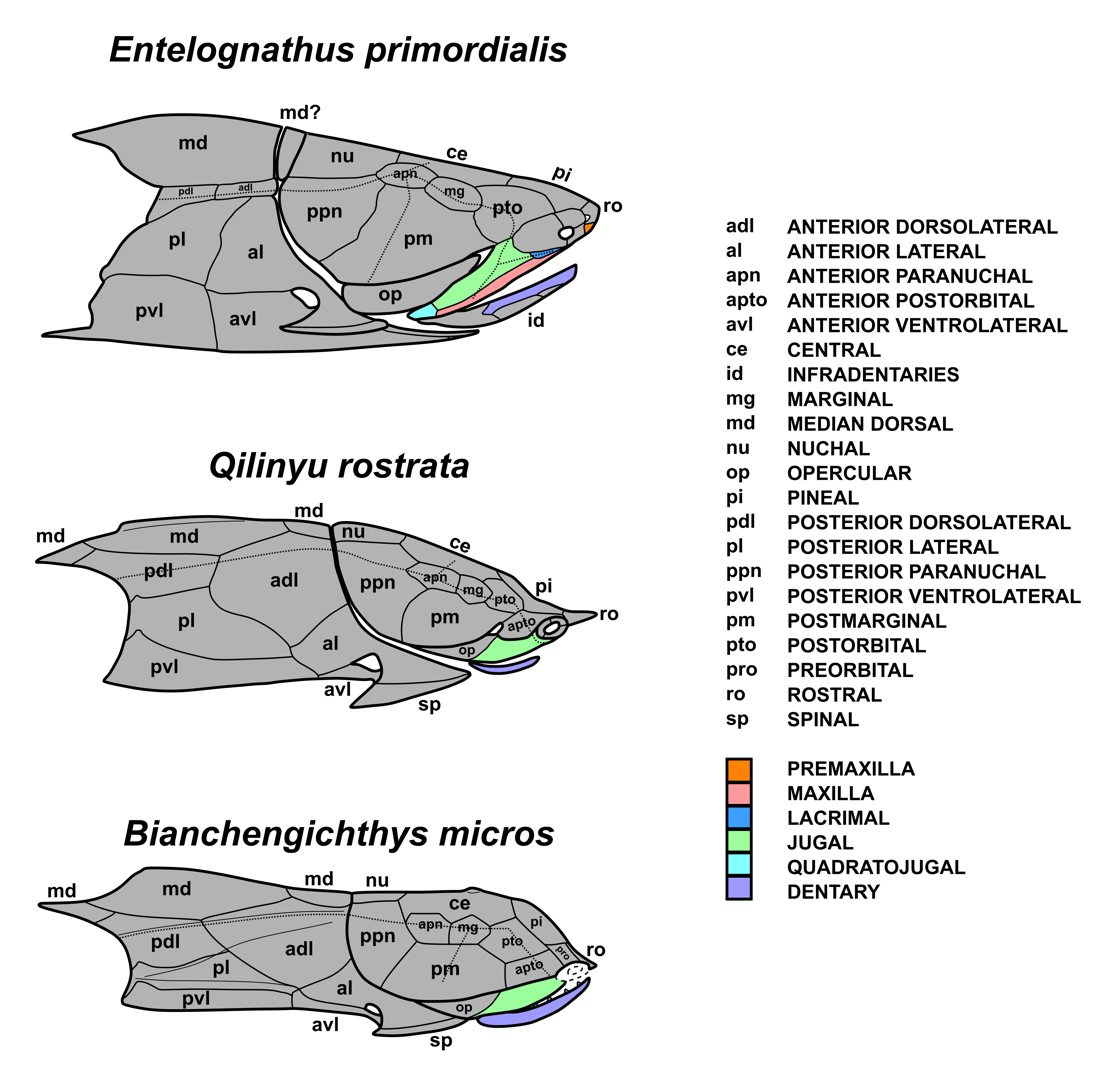
Diagram with other maxillate placoderms in lateral view

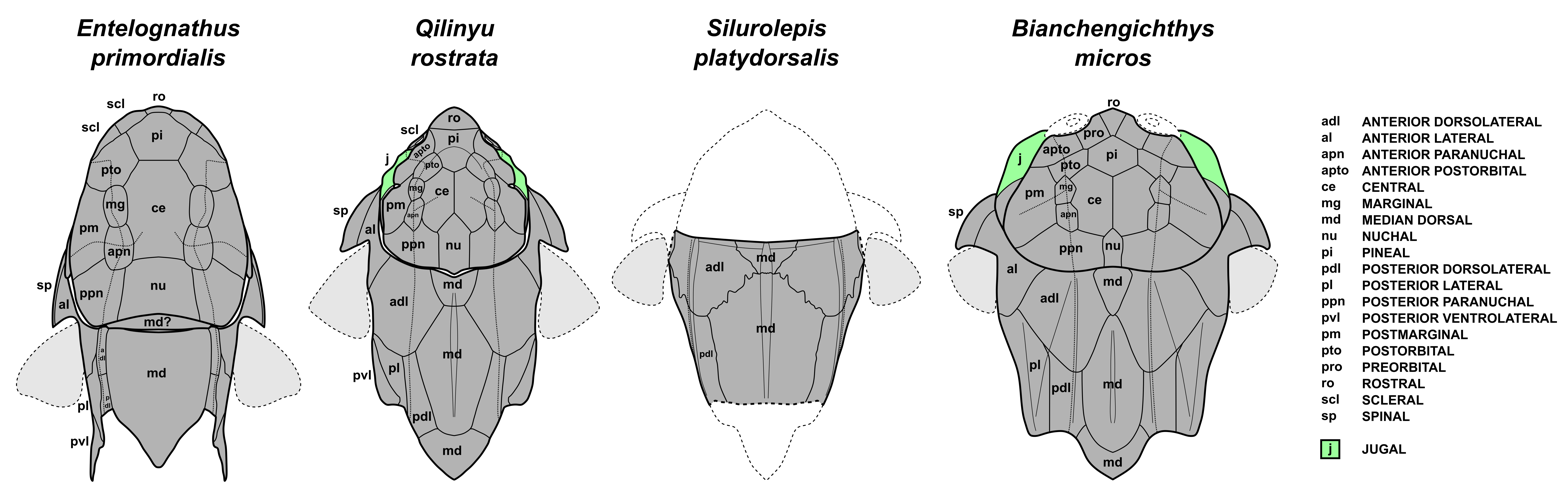
Diagram with other maxillate placoderms in dorsal view

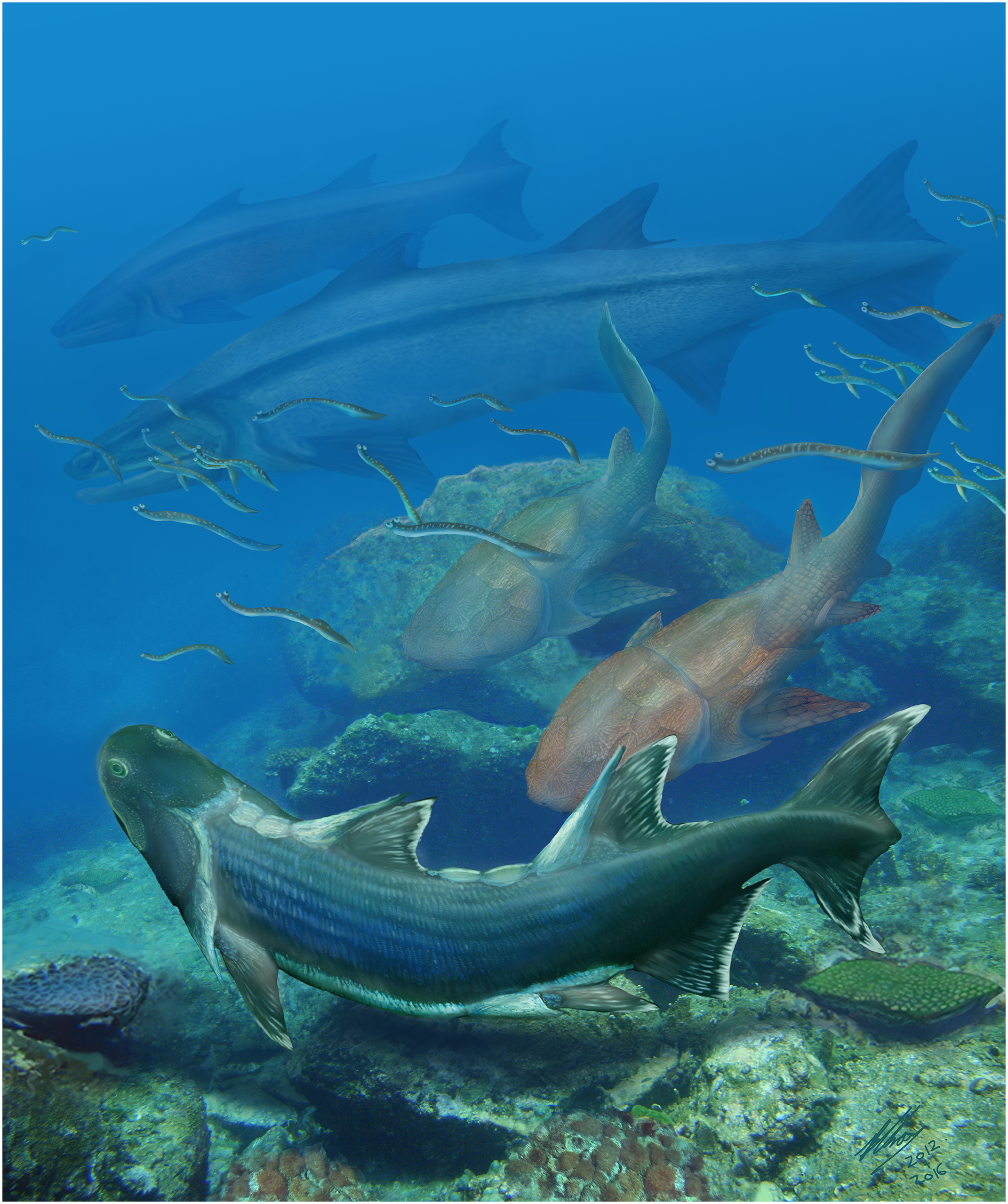
Pair (middle background) among fauna from the Kuanti Formation including Sparalepis tingi (foreground), numerous conodonts, and Megamastax (background)

Video of 3D reconstruction

== See also ==
- Bianchengichthys
- Qilinyu
- Silurolepis
