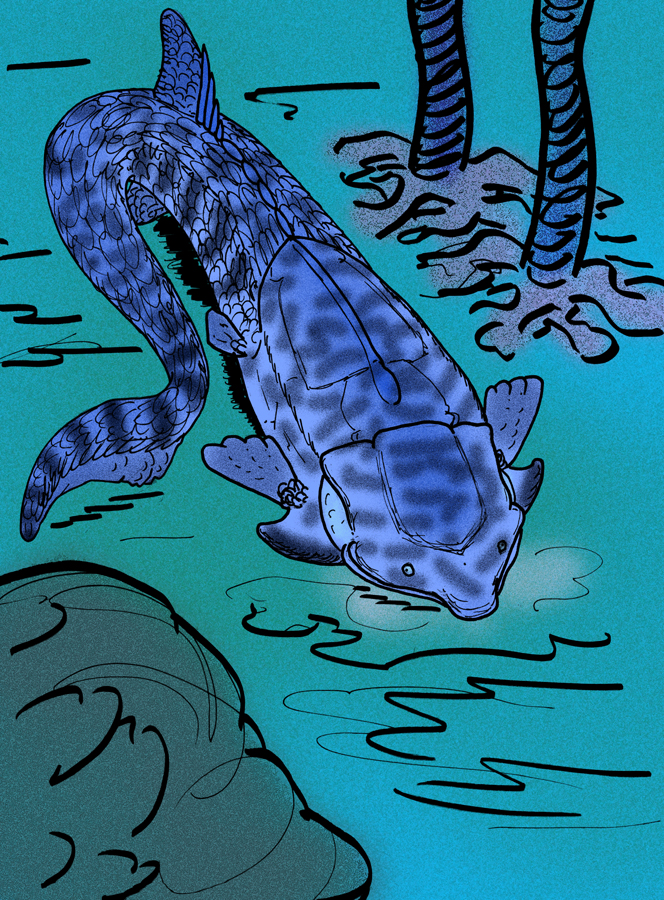
- restoration

Scientific classification
- Kingdom: Animalia
- Phylum: Chordata
- Class: †Placodermi
- Order: †incertae sedis
- Family: †Silurolepidae; Zhang et al., 2010
- Genus: †Silurolepis; Zhang et al., 2010
- Species: †S. platydorsalis

Binomial name
- †Silurolepis platydorsalis Zhang et al., 2010

= Silurolepis =

Silurolepis Temporal range: Ludlow

Extinct genus of fishes

Silurolepis platydorsalis is a species of Silurian-aged "maxillate" early placoderm that has been described from (mostly) articulated remains. Although it has been known for several years, it was finally described by Zhang et al., in 2010.

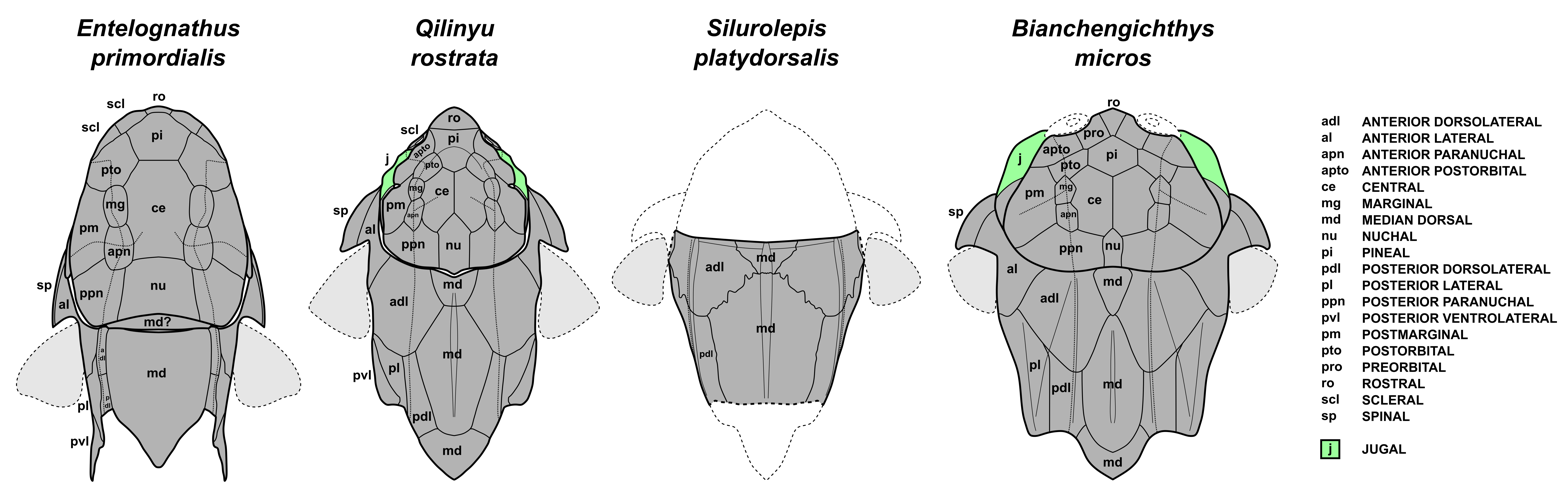
The trunk armor of Silurolepis compared to other maxillate placoderms in dorsal view

S. platydorsalis was previously considered a basal antiarch, but a 2019 study instead recovers it as a maxillate placoderm most closely related to Qilinyu.

S. platydorsalis is known from thoracic armor: as the specific name suggests, the dorsal side is very flat.
