= Janusiscus =

Janusiscus Temporal range: 415 Ma

Scientific classification
- Kingdom: Animalia
- Phylum: Chordata
- Infraphylum: Gnathostomata
- Genus: †Janusiscus; Giles et al., 2015
- Species: †J. schultzei

Binomial name
- †Janusiscus schultzei Giles et al., 2015

Extinct genus of jawed vertebrates

Janusiscus schultzei is an extinct gnathostome vertebrate dating from the Early Devonian period in Siberia, approximately 415 million years ago. It may be the sister group of the last common ancestor of Chondrichthyes (cartilaginous fish) and Osteichthyes (bony fish). This makes J. schultzei a sister species to all living jawed vertebrates. The species name is in honor of Hans-Peter Schultze; the genus named after Janus, the Roman god of duality.

== Taxonomy ==
The following cladogram is simplified from Giles et al., 2015:

- - †Galeaspida
  - - †Osteostraci
    - Gnathostomata
      - †Antiarchi
      - - †Petalichthyida
        - - †Ptyctodontida
          - - †Rhenanida
            - †Arthrodira
            - - †Janusiscus schultzei
              - - Osteichthyes (Bony fish and tetrapods)
                - - †Acanthodii
                  - Chondrichthyes (Cartilaginous fish)
