= Evolution of fish =

Origin and diversification of fish through geologic time

External videos
- Feeding Mechanism of Conodonts – YouTube
- Chordate evolution – YouTube

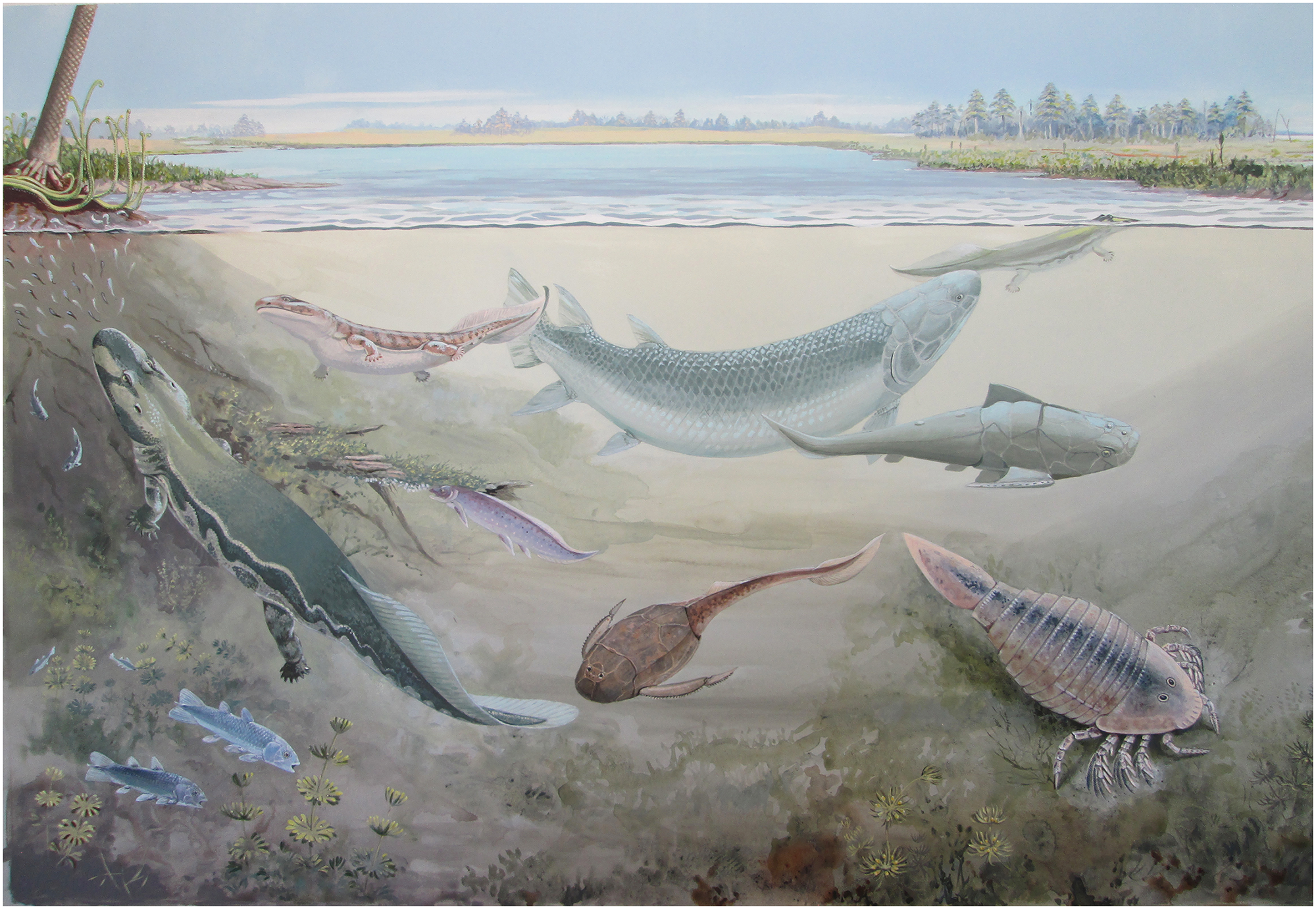
The Devonian period (419–359 Mya), also known as the Age of Fishes, saw the development of early sharks, armoured placoderms and various lobe-finned fish, including the tetrapod transitional species

Fish began evolving about 530 million years ago during the Cambrian explosion. It was during this time that the early chordates developed the skull and the vertebral column, leading to the first craniates and vertebrates. The first fish lineages were jawless. Early examples include Haikouichthys. During the late Cambrian, eel-like jawless fish called the conodonts, and small mostly armoured fish known as "ostracoderms", first appeared. Most jawless fish are now extinct; but the extant lampreys may approximate ancient pre-jawed fish. Lampreys belong to the Cyclostomata, which includes the extant hagfish, and this group may have split early on from other agnathans.

The earliest jawed vertebrates probably developed during the late Ordovician period. They are first represented in the fossil record from the Silurian by two groups of fish: the armoured fish known as placoderms, which evolved from the ostracoderms; and the Acanthodii (or spiny sharks). The jawed fish that are still extant in modern days also appeared during the late Silurian: the Chondrichthyes (or cartilaginous fish) and the Osteichthyes (or bony fish). The bony fish evolved into two separate groups: the Actinopterygii (or ray-finned fish) and Sarcopterygii (which includes the lobe-finned fish).

During the Devonian period a great increase in fish variety occurred, especially among the ostracoderms and placoderms, and also among the lobe-finned fish and early sharks. This has led to the Devonian being known as the age of fishes. It was from the lobe-finned fish that the tetrapods evolved, the four-limbed vertebrates, represented today by amphibians, reptiles, mammals, and birds. Transitional tetrapods first appeared during the early Devonian, and by the late Devonian the first tetrapods appeared. The diversity of jawed vertebrates may indicate the evolutionary advantage of a jawed mouth; but it is unclear if the advantage of a hinged jaw is greater biting force, improved respiration, or a combination of factors.

Fish, like many other organisms, have been greatly affected by extinction events throughout natural history. The earliest ones, the Ordovician–Silurian extinction events, led to the loss of many species. The Late Devonian extinction led to the extinction of the ostracoderms and placoderms by the end of the Devonian, as well as other fish. The spiny sharks became extinct at the Permian–Triassic extinction event; the conodonts became extinct at the Triassic–Jurassic extinction event. The Cretaceous–Paleogene extinction event, and the present-day Holocene extinction, have also affected fish variety and fish stocks.

== Overview ==
Vertebrate classes

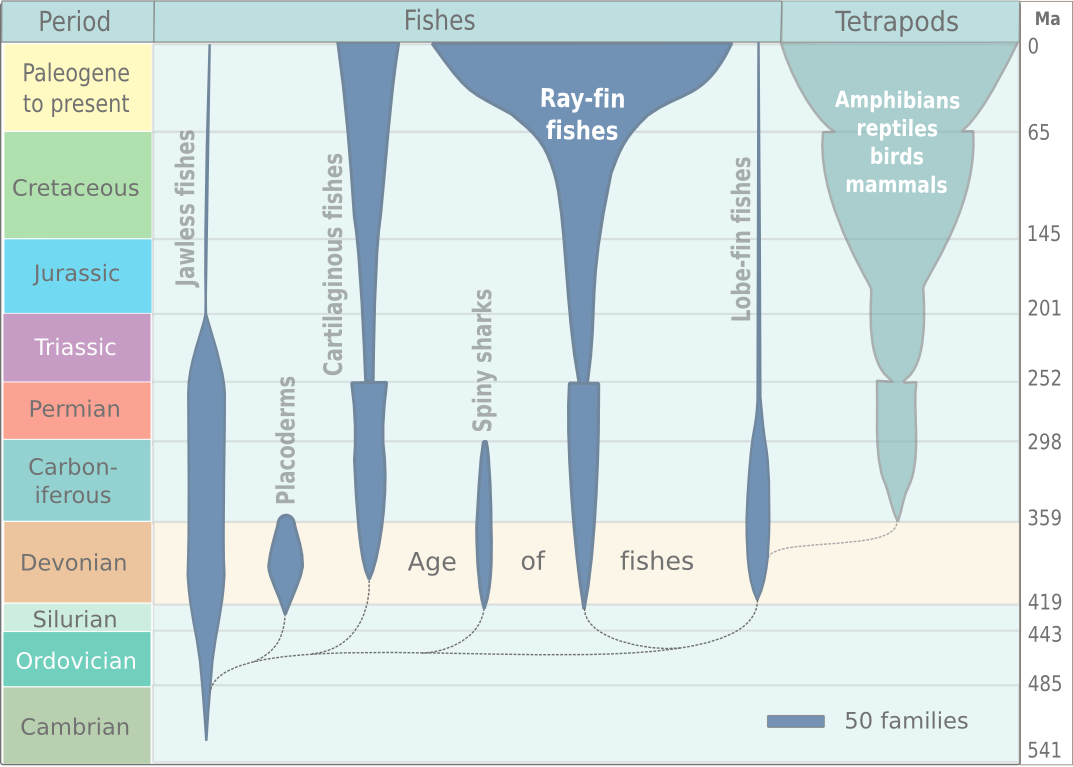
Spindle diagram for the evolution of fish and other vertebrate classes. The diagram is based on Michael Benton, 2005. Conventional classification has living vertebrates as a subphylum grouped into eight classes based on traditional interpretations of gross anatomical and physiological traits. In turn, these classes are grouped into the vertebrates that have four limbs (the tetrapods) and those that do not: fish. The extant vertebrate classes are:

Fish:

- jawless fish (Agnatha)
- cartilaginous fish (Chondrichthyes)
- ray-finned fish (Actinopterygii)
- lobe-finned fish (Sarcopterygii)

Tetrapods:

- amphibians (Amphibia)
- reptiles (Reptilia)
- birds (Aves)
- mammals (Mammalia)

In addition to these are two classes of extinct jawed fish, the armoured placoderms and the spiny sharks.

Fish may have evolved from an animal similar to a coral-like sea squirt (a tunicate), whose larvae resemble early fish in important ways. The first ancestors of fish may have kept the larval form into adulthood, as some sea squirts do today, although this path cannot be proven.

Vertebrates, in other words the first fish, originated about 530 million years ago during the Cambrian explosion, which saw the rise in animal diversity.

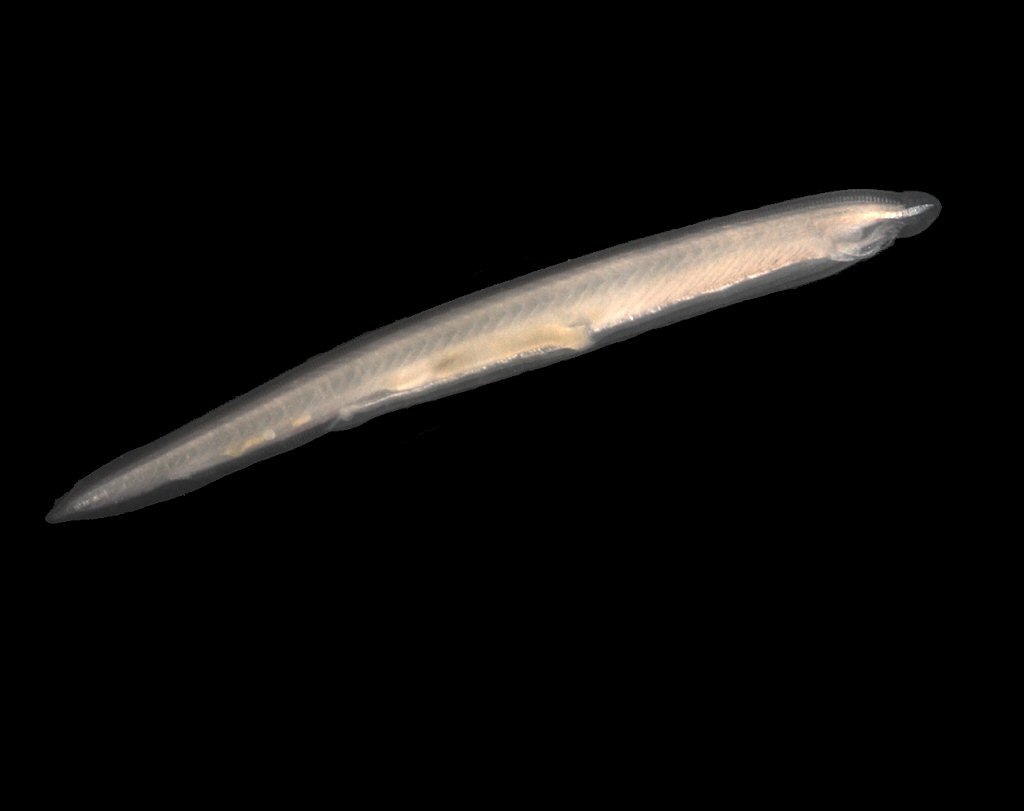
The lancelet, a small, translucent, fish-like animal, is the closest living invertebrate relative of the chordate clade Olfactores (vertebrates and tunicates).

The first ancestors of fish, or animals that were probably closely related to fish, were Haikouichthys and Myllokunmingia. These two genera all appeared around 530 Mya. Unlike the other fauna that dominated the Cambrian, these groups had the basic vertebrate body plan: a notochord, rudimentary vertebrae, and a well-defined head and tail. All of these early vertebrates lacked jaws, relying instead on filter-feeding close to the seabed.

These were followed by indisputable fossil vertebrates in the form of heavily armoured fish discovered in rocks from the Ordovician period (500–430 Mya).

The first jawed vertebrates appeared in the late Ordovician and became common in the Devonian, often known as the "Age of Fishes". The two groups of bony fish, the Actinopterygii and Sarcopterygii, evolved and became common. The Devonian saw the demise of virtually all jawless fish, save for lampreys and hagfish, as well as the Placodermi, a group of armoured fish that dominated much of the late Silurian, and the rise of the first labyrinthodonts, transitional between fish and amphibians.

Idealised vertebrate body plan, showing key characteristics

The colonisation of new niches resulted in diversification of body plans and sometimes an increase in size. The Devonian period (395 to 345 Mya) brought in such giants as the placoderm Dunkleosteus up to seven meters long, and early air-breathing fish that could remain on land for extended periods. Among this latter group were ancestral amphibians.

The reptiles appeared from labyrinthodonts in the subsequent Carboniferous period. The anapsid and synapsid amniotas were common during the late Paleozoic, while the diapsids became dominant during the Mesozoic. In the sea, the bony fish became dominant.

The later radiations, such as those of fish in the Silurian and Devonian periods, involved fewer taxa, mainly with very similar body plans. The first animals to venture onto dry land were arthropods. Some fish had lungs and strong, bony fins and could crawl onto the land also.

== Jawless fish ==
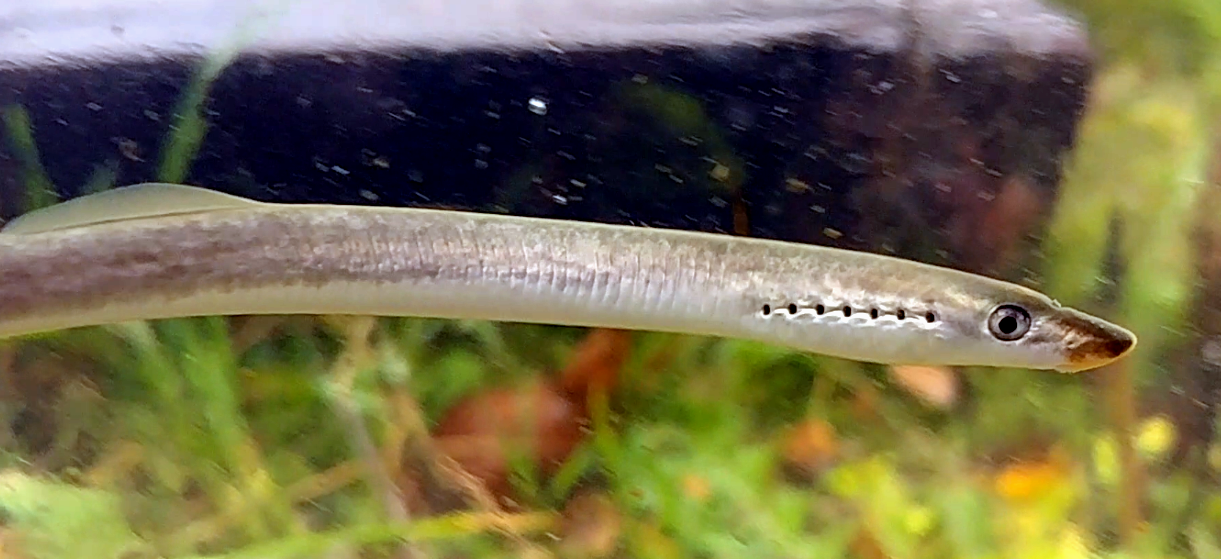
A modern jawless fish, the Brook lamprey, part of Petromyzontiformes

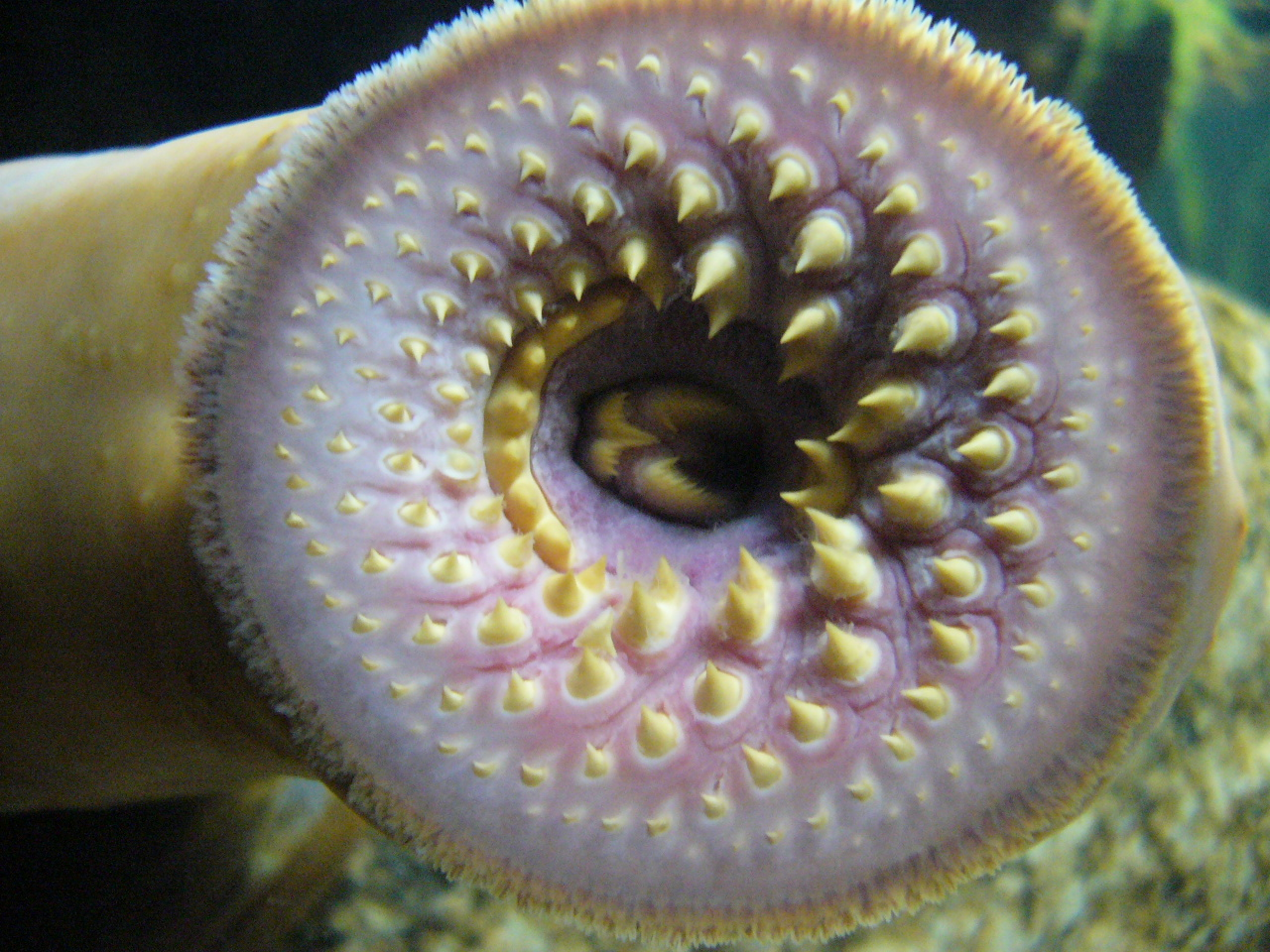
Mouth of the sea lamprey (Petromyzon marinus)

Jawless fish belong to the superclass Agnatha in the phylum Chordata, subphylum Vertebrata. Agnatha means 'un-jawed, without jaws' (from Ancient Greek). It excludes all vertebrates with jaws, known as gnathostomes. Although a minor element of modern marine fauna, jawless fish were prominent among the early fish in the early Paleozoic. Two types of Early Cambrian animal which apparently had fins, vertebrate musculature, and gills are known from the early Cambrian Maotianshan shales of China: Haikouichthys and Myllokunmingia. They have been tentatively assigned to Agnatha by Janvier. A third possible agnathan from the same region is Haikouella.

Many Ordovician, Silurian and Devonian agnathians were armoured with heavy, bony, and often elaborately sculpted, plates derived from mineralized scales. The first armoured agnathans—the ostracoderms, precursors to the bony fish and hence to the tetrapods (including humans)—are known from the Middle Ordovician, and by the Late Silurian the agnathans had reached the high point of their evolution. Most of the ostracoderms, such as thelodonts, osteostracans and galeaspids, were more closely related to the gnathostomes than to the surviving agnathans, known as cyclostomes. Cyclostomes apparently split from other agnathans before the evolution of dentine and bone, which are present in many fossil agnathans, including conodonts. Agnathans declined in the Devonian and never recovered.

The agnathans as a whole are paraphyletic, because most extinct agnathans belong to the stem group of the gnathostomes, the jawed fish that evolved from them. Molecular data, both from rRNA and from mtDNA strongly supports the theory that living agnathans, known as cyclostomes, are monophyletic. In phylogenetic taxonomy, the relationships between animals are not typically divided into ranks, but illustrated as a nested "family tree" known as a cladogram. Phylogenetic groups are given definitions based on their relationship to one another, rather than purely on physical traits such as the presence of a backbone. This nesting pattern is often combined with traditional taxonomy, in a practice known as evolutionary taxonomy.

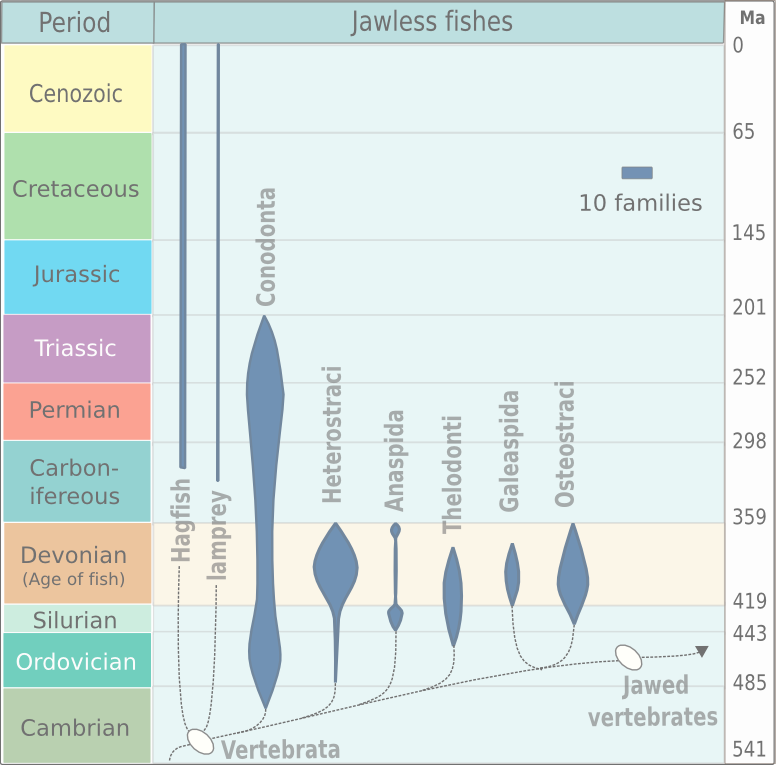
Evolution of jawless fish. The diagram is based on Michael Benton, 2005.

The below cladogram for jawless fish is based on studies by Philippe Janvier and others for the Tree of Life Web Project. It predates molecular studies. (†=group is extinct)

- Jawless fish
  - Hyperoartia (lampreys)
  - ?†Euconodonta (eel-like animals)
  - - †Pteraspidomorphi (jawless fish)
    - ?†Thelodonti (jawless fish with scales)
    - - ?†Anaspida
      - - †Galeaspida (jawless fish with bone head shields)
        - - ?†Pituriaspida (armoured jawless fish with large rostrums)
          - †Osteostraci (bony armoured jawless fish with heads covered with a bony shield)
          - Jawed vertebrates → continued in section below

Compare the above with a newer interpretation that unites the hagfishes and the lampreys:

- Jawless fish
  - †Myllokunmingiida
  - - †Metaspriggina
    - - - †Anaspida
        - - †Pipiscius
          - - †Conodonta
            - Cyclostomata (lampreys and hagfishes)
      - Jawed vertebrates → continued in section below

The genomes of hagfishes and lampreys have not only supported the Cyclostomata-Gnathostomata split, but also illustrated details on how both groups have come to be.

=== ^{†}Conodonts ===
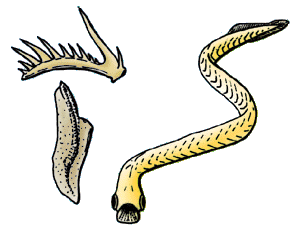
^{†}Conodonts (extinct) resembled primitive jawless eels

Conodonts resembled primitive jawless eels. They appeared 520 Ma ago and were wiped out 200 Ma ago. Initially they were known only from tooth-like microfossils called conodont elements. These "teeth" have been variously interpreted as filter-feeding apparatuses or as a "grasping and crushing array". Conodonts ranged in length from a centimetre to the 40 cm Promissum. Their large eyes had a lateral position, which makes a predatory role unlikely. The preserved musculature hints that some conodonts (Promissum at least) were efficient cruisers but incapable of bursts of speed. In 2012 researchers classified the conodonts in the phylum Chordata on the basis of their fins with fin rays, chevron-shaped muscles and notochord. Some researchers see them as vertebrates similar in appearance to modern hagfish and lampreys, though phylogenetic analysis suggests that they are more derived than either of these groups.

=== ^{†}Ostracoderms ===
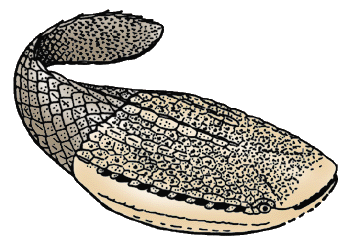
†Ostracoderms (extinct) were armoured jawless fish

Ostracoderms (lit. 'shell-skinned') are armoured jawless fish of the Paleozoic. The term does not often appear in classifications today because the taxon is paraphyletic or polyphyletic, and has no phylogenetic meaning. However, the term is still used informally to group together the armoured jawless fish.

The ostracoderm armour consisted of 3–5 mm polygonal plates that shielded the head and gills, and then overlapped further down the body like scales. The eyes were particularly shielded. Earlier chordates used their gills for both respiration and feeding, whereas ostracoderms used their gills for respiration only. They had up to eight separate pharyngeal gill pouches along the side of the head, which were permanently open with no protective operculum. Unlike invertebrates that use ciliated motion to move food, ostracoderms used their muscular pharynx to create a suction that pulled small and slow-moving prey into their mouths.

The first fossil fish that were discovered were ostracoderms. The Swiss anatomist Louis Agassiz received some fossils of bony armoured fish from Scotland in the 1830s. He had a hard time classifying them as they did not resemble any living creature. He compared them at first with extant armoured fish such as catfish and sturgeons but later, realizing that they had no movable jaws, classified them in 1844 into a new group "ostracoderms".

Ostracoderms existed in two major groups, the more primitive heterostracans and the cephalaspids. Later, about 420 million years ago, the jawed fish evolved from one of the ostracoderms. After the appearance of jawed fish, most ostracoderm species underwent a decline, and the last ostracoderms became extinct at the end of the Devonian period.

== Jawed fish ==
Dunkleosteus, a Placoderm
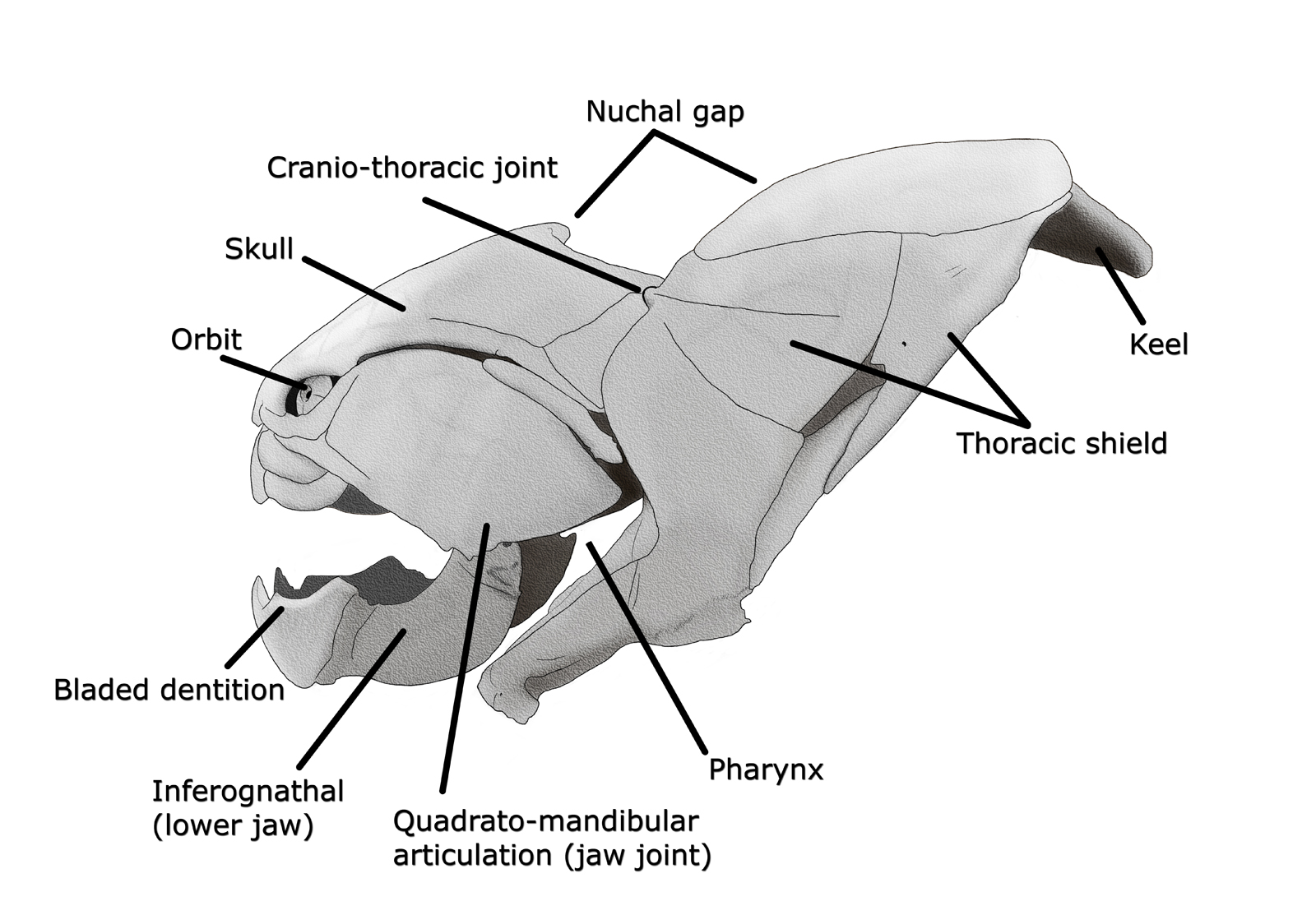
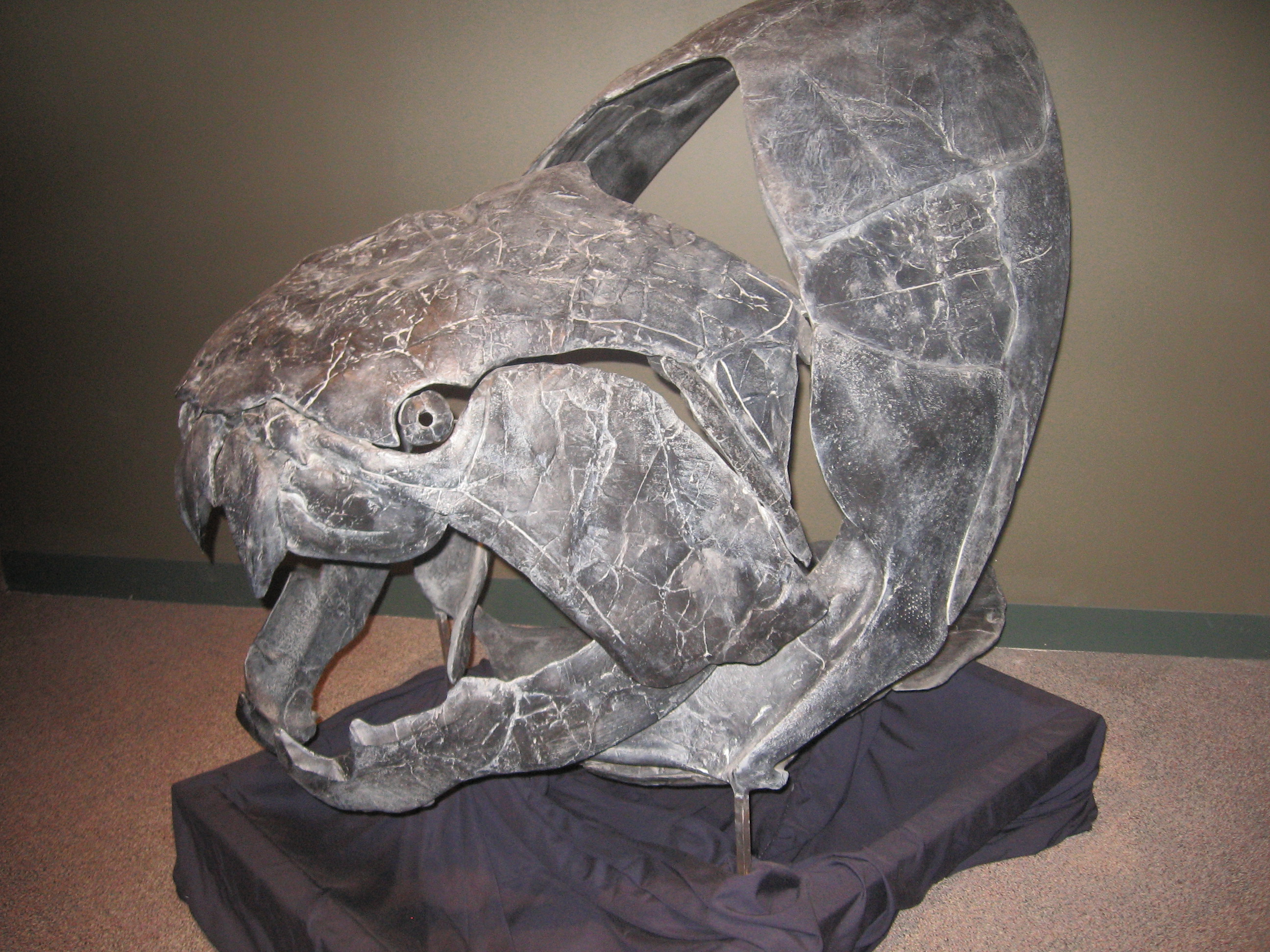

The vertebrate jaw probably originally evolved in the Silurian period and appeared in the Placoderm fish, which further diversified in the Devonian. The two most anterior pharyngeal arches are thought to have become the jaw itself and the hyoid arch, respectively. The hyoid system suspends the jaw from the braincase of the skull, permitting great mobility of the jaws. Already long assumed to be a paraphyletic assemblage leading to more derived gnathostomes, the discovery of Entelognathus suggests that placoderms are directly ancestral to modern bony fish.

As in most vertebrates, fish jaws are bony or cartilaginous and oppose vertically, comprising an upper jaw and a lower jaw. The jaw is derived from the most anterior two pharyngeal arches supporting the gills, and usually bears numerous teeth. The skull of the last common ancestor of today's jawed vertebrates is assumed to have resembled sharks.

It is thought that the original selective advantages offered by the jaw were not related to feeding, but to increases in respiration efficiency. The jaws were used in the buccal pump (observable in modern fish and amphibians) that pumps water across the gills of fish or air into the lungs in the case of amphibians. Over evolutionary time the more familiar use of jaws (to humans) in feeding was selected for and became a very important function in vertebrates. Many teleost fish have substantially modified their jaws for suction feeding and jaw protrusion, resulting in highly complex jaws with dozens of bones involved.

Jawed vertebrates and jawed fish evolved from earlier jawless fish. The cladogram for jawed vertebrates is a continuation of the cladogram in the section above. (†=extinct)

- - †Osteostraci
  - Jawed vertebrates
    - †"Placoderm" (Antiarchi)
    - - †"Placoderm" (Rhenanida)
      - - †"Placoderm" (Ptyctodontida)
        - - †"Placoderm" (Arthrodira)
          - - †"Placoderm" grade stem-gnathostomes with a maxilla
            - - †Janusiscus
              - - Chondrichthyes (cartilaginous fish)
                - Osteichthyes (bony fish)
                  - Actinopterygii (ray-finned fish), dominant class of fish today
                  - Sarcopterygii (lobe-finned fish)
                    - ?†Onychodontiformes (lobe-finned)
                    - Actinistia (coelacanths)
                    - - †Porolepiformes (lobe-finned)
                      - Dipnoi (lungfish)
                    - - †Rhizodontimorpha (predatory lobe-finned)
                      - - †Tristichopteridae (tetrapodomorphs)
                        - Tetrapods (four-limbed generally terrestrial animals)

=== ^{†"}Placoderms" ===
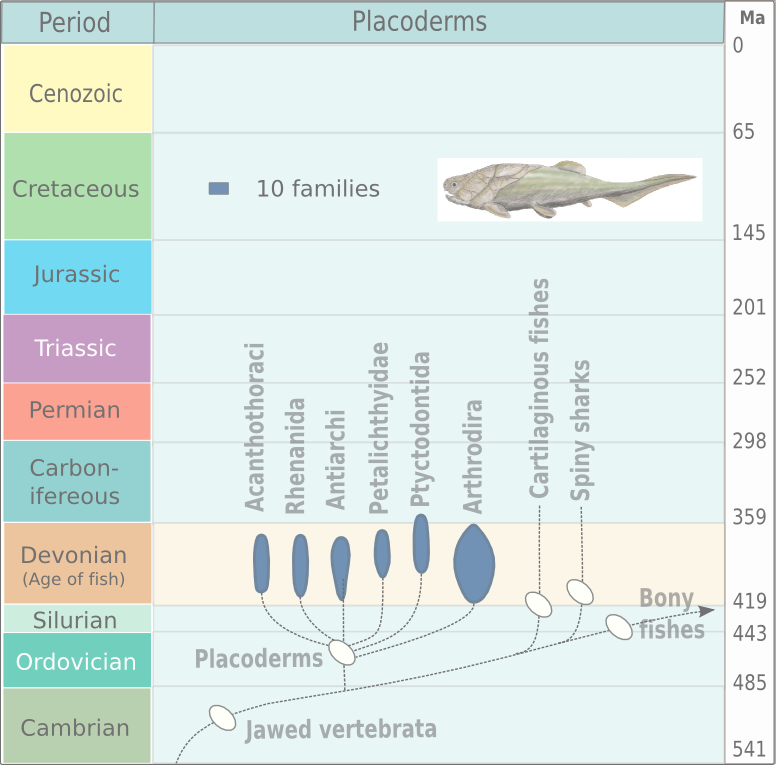
Evolution of ^{†}"placoderms". The diagram is based on Michael Benton, 2005.

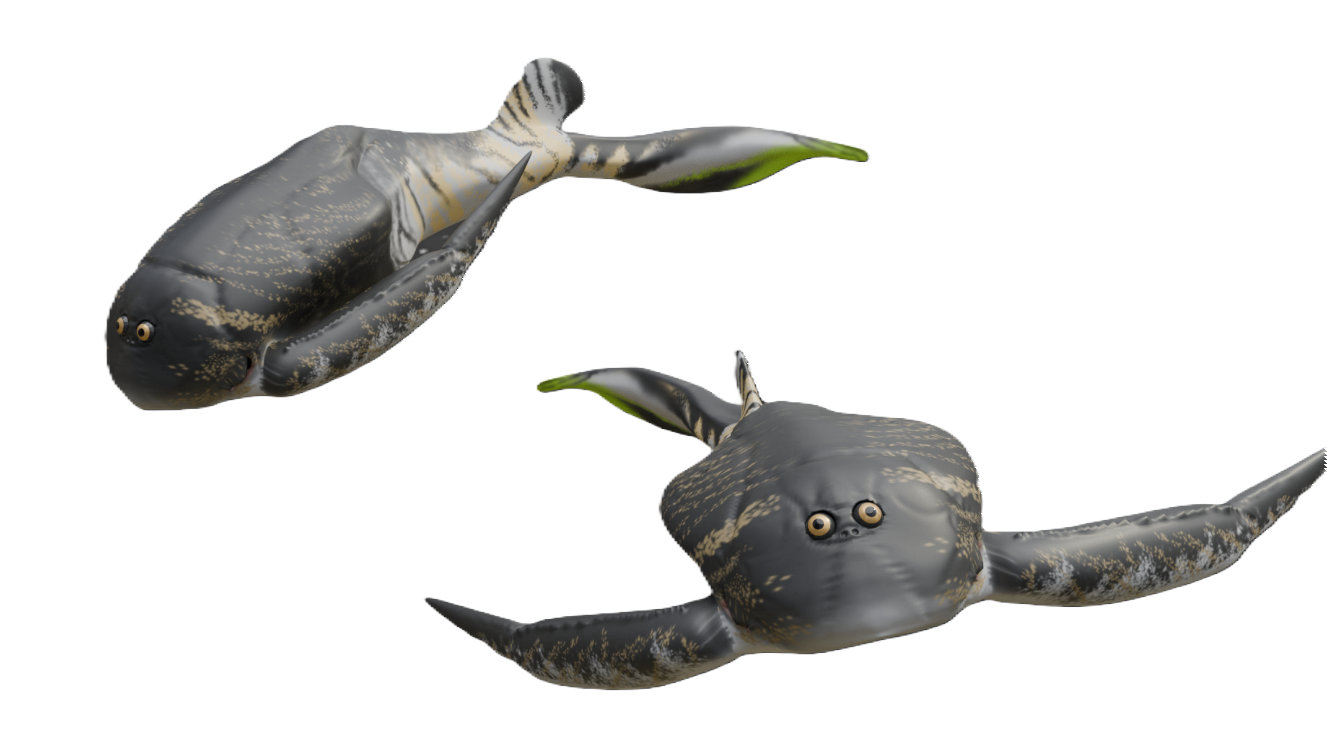
^{†}Placoderms (extinct) were armoured jawed fish (compare with the ostracoderms above)

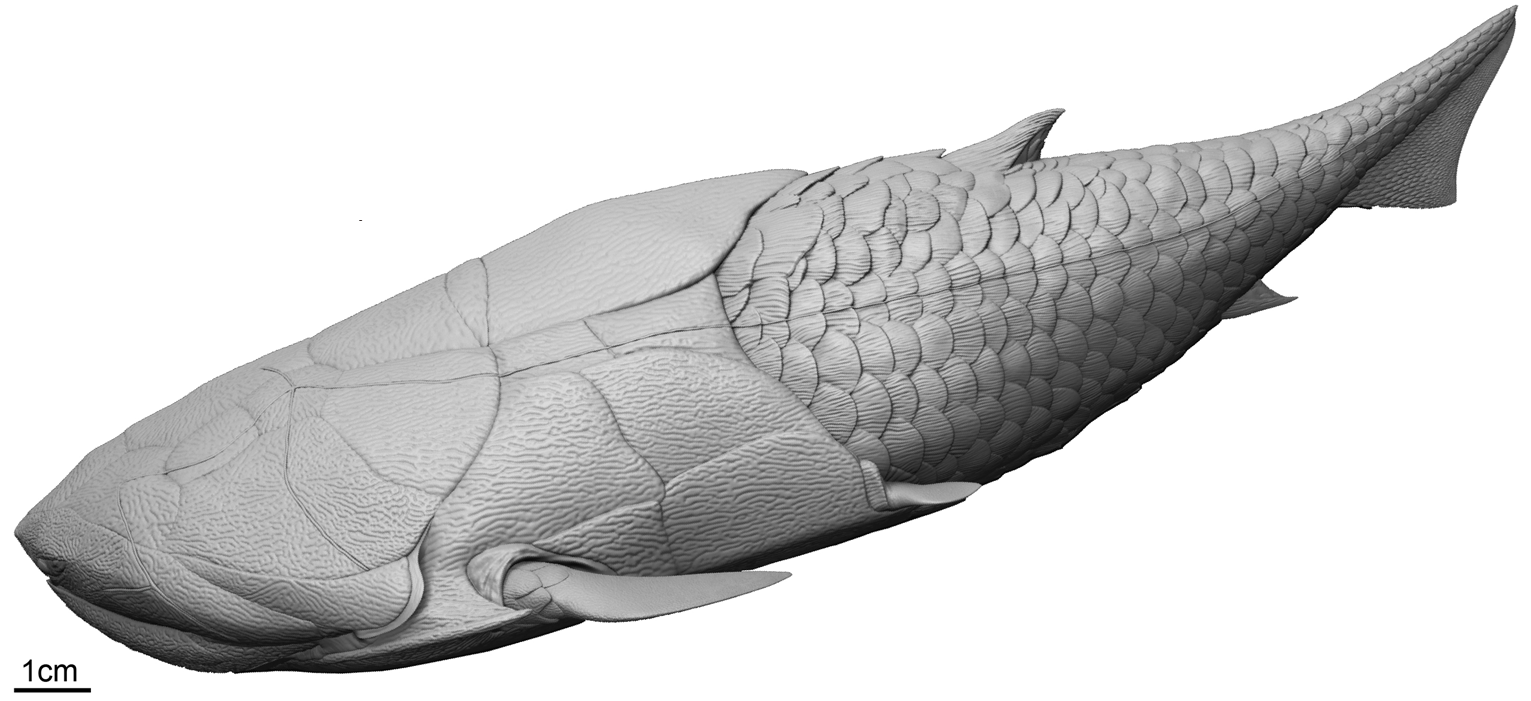
^{†}Entelognathus, a "placoderm" close to the common ancestor of crown gnathostomes

Placoderms ('plate-skinned'), are an extinct, potentially paraphyletic group of jawed vertebrates, which appeared about 430 Ma in the Early to Middle Silurian. Their diversity sharply declined during the Late Devonian extinction event, 378 Ma, though some survived and made a slight recovery in diversity during the Famennian epoch before dying out entirely at the close of the Devonian, 360 Ma. If they are paraphyletic, they are ancestral to modern (crown) gnathostome vertebrates. Their head and thorax were mostly composed of a protective dermal bone-based skeleton. The rest of the body was scaled or naked, depending on the species. The dermal pectoral girdle articulated with the dermal cranium via a cranio-thoracic joint. This allowed placoderms to elevate their heads, unlike more basal jawless fish groups. Placoderms were the most basal jawed fish; their jaws likely evolved from the first of their gill arches. The chart on the right shows the rise and demise of the separate placoderm lineages: Acanthothoraci, Rhenanida, Antiarchi, Petalichthyidae, Ptyctodontida and Arthrodira.

=== ^{†}Spiny sharks ===
^{†}Spiny sharks (extinct) resembled sharks and were ancestral to them.

Spiny 'sharks', known as acanthodians, are extinct fish that share features with both bony and cartilaginous fish, though ultimately more closely related to and ancestral to the latter. Despite being called "spiny sharks", acanthodians predate sharks, though they gave rise to them. They evolved in the sea at the beginning of the Silurian period, some 50 million years before the first sharks appeared. Eventually competition from bony fish proved too much, and the spiny sharks died out in Permian times about 250 Ma. In form they resembled sharks, but their epidermis was covered with tiny rhomboid platelets like the scales of holosteans (gars, bowfins).

=== Cartilaginous fish ===
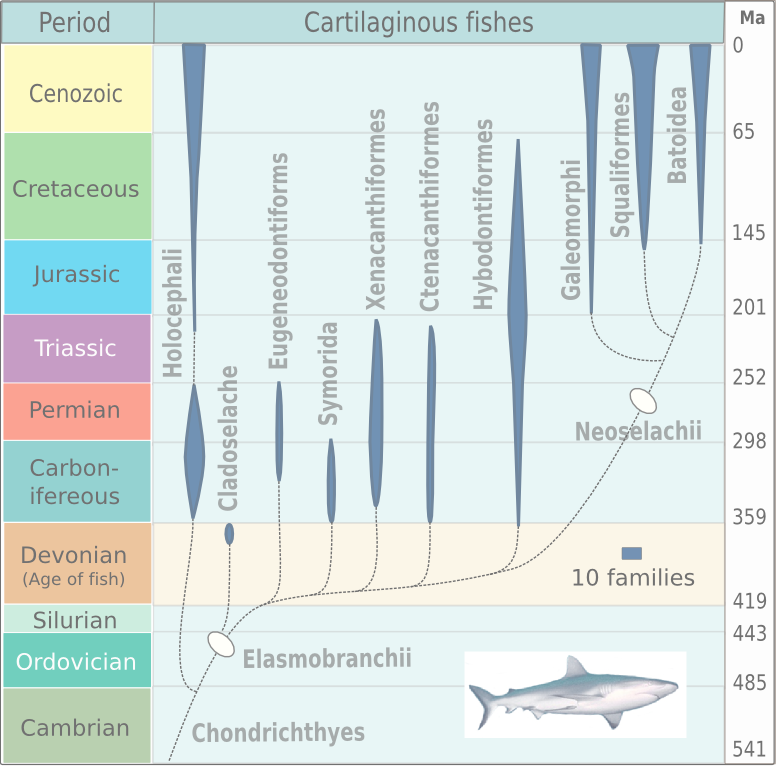
Radiation of chondrichthyans, derived from work by Michael Benton, 2005.

Cartilaginous fish, class Chondrichthyes, consisting of sharks, rays and chimaeras, appeared by about 395 million years ago, in the Middle Devonian, evolving from acanthodians. The class contains the subclasses Holocephali (chimaeras) and Elasmobranchii (sharks and rays). The radiation of elasmobranches in the chart on the right is divided into the following taxa: Cladoselache, Eugeneodontiformes, Symmoriida, Xenacanthiformes, Ctenacanthiformes, Hybodontiformes, Galeomorphi, Squaliformes and Batoidea.

=== Bony fish ===
Bony fish, class Osteichthyes, are characterised by bony skeleton rather than cartilage. They appeared in the late Silurian, about 419 million years ago. The recent discovery of Entelognathus strongly suggests that bony fish (and possibly cartilaginous fish, via acanthodians) evolved from early placoderms. A subclass of the Osteichthyes, the ray-finned fish (Actinopterygii), have become the dominant group of fish in the post-Paleozoic and modern world, with some 30,000 living species. The bony (and cartilaginous) fish groups that emerged after the Devonian were characterised by steady improvements in foraging and locomotion.

==== Lobe-finned fish ====
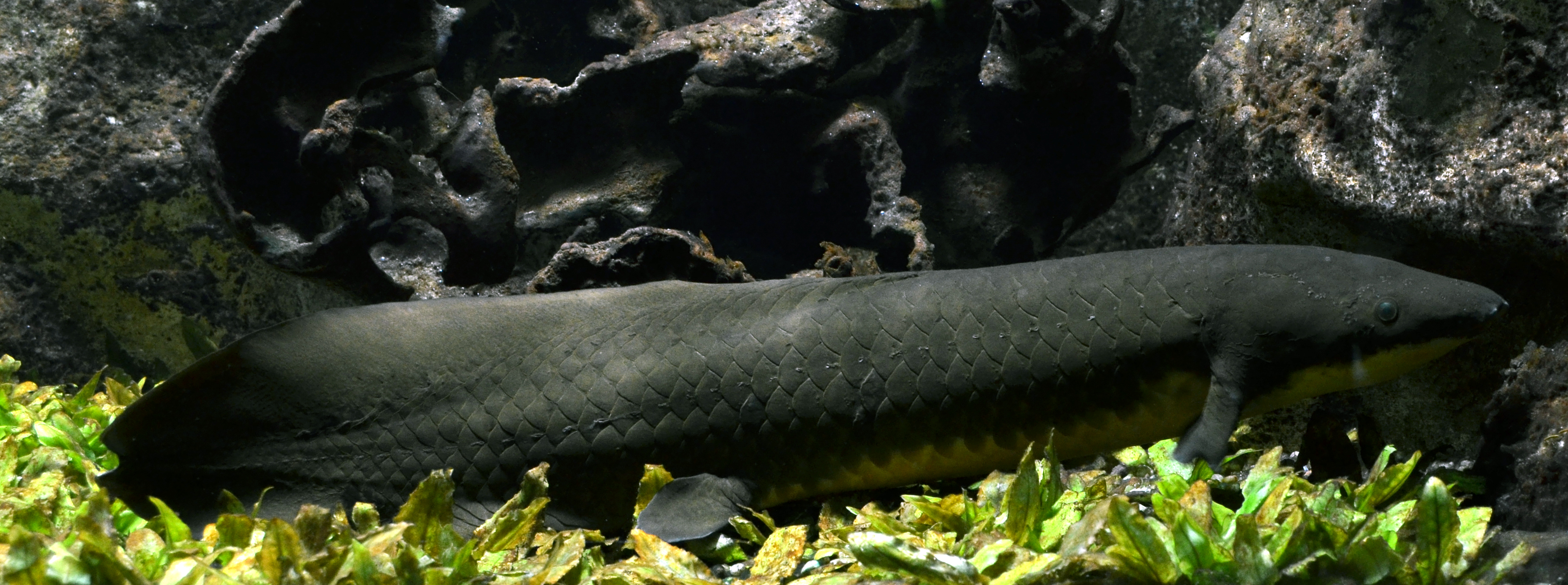
The Queensland lungfish The lungfish is a lobe-finned fish loosely described as a living fossil. Lungfish evolved the first proto-lungs and proto-limbs. They developed the ability to live outside a water environment in the Middle Devonian (397–385 Mya), and have remained virtually the same for over 100 million years. Phylogenomic analysis has shown that "the closest living fish to the tetrapod ancestor is the lungfish, not the coelacanth".

Lobe-finned fish, fish belonging to the class Sarcopterygii, are mostly extinct bony fish, basally characterised by robust and stubby lobe fins containing a robust internal skeleton, cosmoid scales and internal nostrils. Their fins are fleshy, lobed, and paired, joined to the body by a single bone. The fins of lobe-finned fish differ from those of all other fish in that each is borne on a fleshy, lobelike, scaly stalk extending from the body. The pectoral and pelvic fins are articulated in ways resembling the tetrapod limbs they were the precursors to. The fins evolved into the legs of the first tetrapod land vertebrates, amphibians. They also possess two dorsal fins with separate bases, as opposed to the single dorsal fin of ray-finned fish. The braincase of lobe-finned fish primitively has a hinge line, but this is lost in tetrapods and lungfish. Many early lobe-finned fish have a symmetrical tail. All lobe-finned fish possess teeth covered with true enamel.

Lobe-finned fish, such as coelacanths and lungfish, were the most diverse group of bony fish in the Devonian. Taxonomists who subscribe to the cladistic approach include the grouping Tetrapoda within the Sarcopterygii, and the tetrapods in turn include all species of four-limbed vertebrates. The fin-limbs of lobe-finned fish such as the coelacanths show a strong similarity to the expected ancestral form of tetrapod limbs. The lobe-finned fish apparently followed two different lines of development and are accordingly separated into two subclasses, the Rhipidistia (including the lungfish, and the Tetrapodomorpha, which include the Tetrapoda) and the Actinistia (coelacanths). The first lobe-finned fish, found in the uppermost Silurian (c. 418 Mya), closely resembled spiny sharks, which became extinct at the end of the Paleozoic. In the Early to Middle Devonian (416–385 Mya), while the predatory placoderms dominated the seas, some lobe-finned fish came into freshwater habitats.

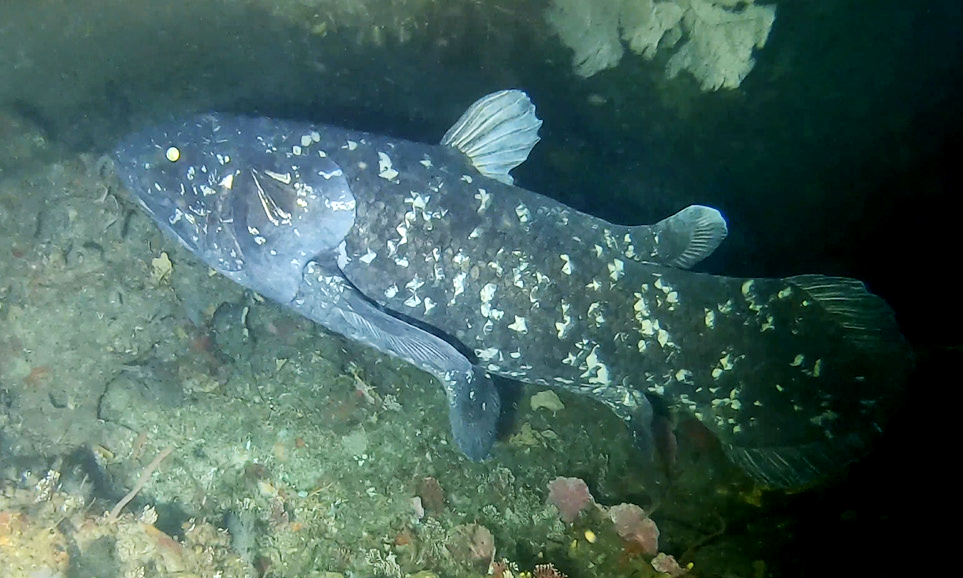
The coelacanth is another lobe-finned fish, loosely known as a "living fossil". The coelacanth body plan evolved roughly 408 million years ago, during the Early Devonian; the two modern species have much the same shape.

In the Early Devonian (416-397 Mya), the lobe-finned fish split into two main lineages — the coelacanths and the rhipidistians. The heyday of the former was the Late Devonian and Carboniferous, from 385 to 299 Mya, as they were more common during those periods than in any other period in the Phanerozoic; coelacanths still live today in the oceans (genus Latimeria). The Rhipidistians, whose ancestors probably lived in estuaries, migrated into freshwater habitats. They in turn split into two major groups: the lungfish and the tetrapodomorphs. The lungfish's greatest diversity was in the Triassic period; today there are three genera left. The lungfish evolved the first proto-lungs and proto-limbs, developing the ability to live outside a water environment in the Middle Devonian (397–385 Mya). The first tetrapodomorphs, which included the gigantic rhizodonts, had the same general anatomy as the lungfish, who were their closest kin, but they appear not to have left their water habitat until the Late Devonian epoch (385–359 Mya), with the appearance of tetrapods (four-legged vertebrates). Lobe-finned fish continued until towards the end of Paleozoic era, suffering heavy losses during the Permian-Triassic extinction event (251 Mya).

==== Ray-finned fish ====
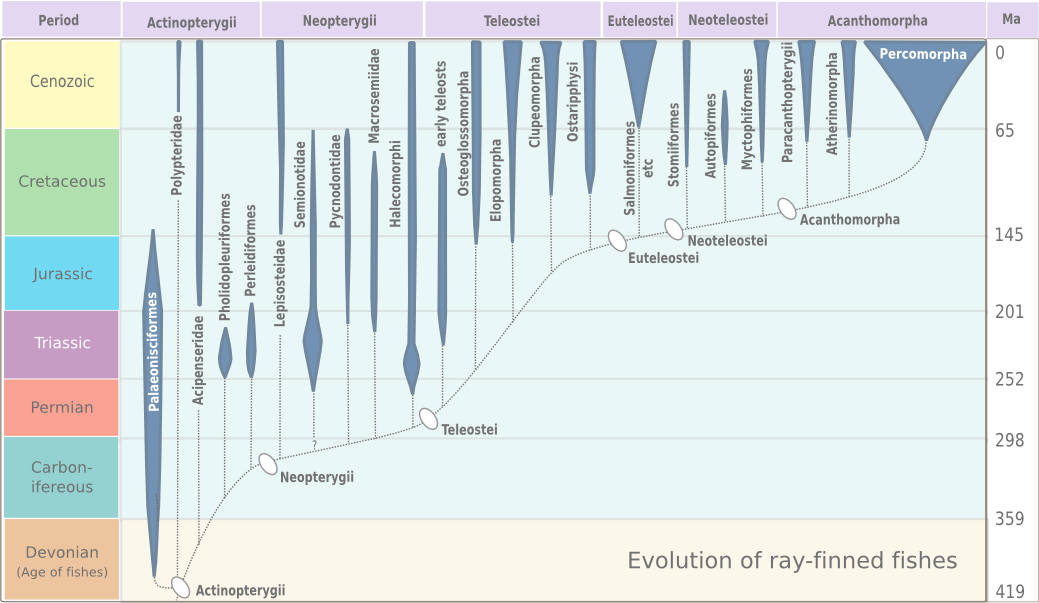
The evolution of ray-finned osteichthyans by Michael Benton, 2005.

Ray-finned fish, class Actinopterygii, differ from lobe-finned fish in that their fins consist of webs of skin supported by spines ("rays") made of bone or horn. There are other differences in respiratory and circulatory structures. Ray-finned fish normally have skeletons made from true bone, though this is not true of sturgeons and paddlefish.

Ray-finned fish are a dominant vertebrate group, containing half of all known vertebrate species. They inhabit abyssal depths in the sea, coastal inlets and freshwater rivers and lakes, and are a major source of food for humans.

== See also ==
- Comparative anatomy
- Evolution of paired fins
- Ichthyolith
- Convergent evolution in fish
- List of fossil sites
- Lists of prehistoric fish
- List of years in palaeontology
- Old Red Sandstone
- Parodies of the ichthys symbol
- History of life
- Walking fish - fish with tetrapod-like features
- Vertebrate palaeontology
- Phylliroe

== Sources ==
- Benton, Michael J. (2005). Vertebrate Palaeontology.
- Berg, Linda R.; Eldra Pearl Solomon; Diana W. Martin (2004). Biology. Cengage Learning. ISBN 978-0-534-49276-2.
- Encyclopædia Britannica (1954). Encyclopædia Britannica: A new survey of universal knowledge. Vol. 17.
- Helfman, G.; Collette, B.; Facey, D.; Bowen, B. (2009). The Diversity of Fishes: Biology, Evolution, and Ecology (2nd ed.). Wiley-Blackwell. ISBN 978-1-4051-2494-2. Archived from the original on 26 August 2021.
- Nelson, Joseph S. (2006). Fishes of the World. John Wiley & Sons. ISBN 978-0-471-25031-9.
- Romer, A.S. (1970). The Vertebrate Body (4 ed.). London: W.B. Saunders.
