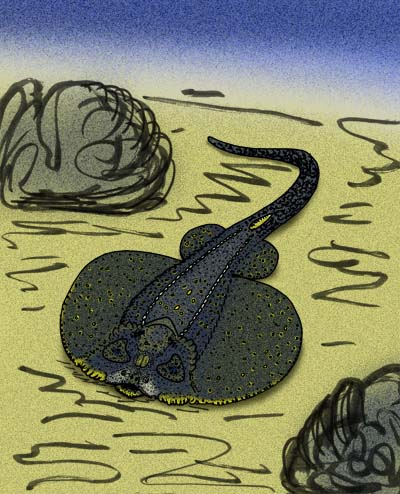

Scientific classification
- Domain: Eukaryota
- Kingdom: Animalia
- Phylum: Chordata
- Class: †Placodermi
- Order: †Rhenanida
- Family: †Asterosteidae
- Genus: †Jagorina; Jaekel, 1921
- Species: †J. pandora

Binomial name
- †Jagorina pandora Jaekel, 1921

= Jagorina =

Jagorina Temporal range: Upper Frasnian

Jagorina pandora is a rhenanid placoderm of Upper Frasnian Germany. As with other rhenanids, it was a flattened, skate-like fish protected in an armor made up of unfused tubercles, and preyed on other, smaller fish by ambushing them from the sea bottom.

Although J. pandora is known primarily from bone fragments and an intact skull, it is the second most studied rhenanid, after Gemuendina stuertzi. It is from Jagorina that the details of the skull anatomy of rhenanids are known. Although scientists know of the overall anatomy and bodyplan of rhenanids because of G. stuertzi, very little information has been gleaned from the skulls of G. stuertzi, as all of the specimens of that species have been greatly flattened during fossilization.
