= Austroptyctodus =

Austroptyctodus Temporal range: Late Frasnian

Scientific classification
- Kingdom: Animalia
- Phylum: Chordata
- Class: †Placodermi
- Order: †Ptyctodontida
- Family: †Ptyctodontidae
- Genus: †Austroptyctodus; Long, 1997
- Species: †A. gardineri

Binomial name
- †Austroptyctodus gardineri Long, 1997

Synonyms
- Ctenurella gardineri

Extinct genus of fishes

Austroptyctodus gardineri is a small ptyctodontid placoderm fish from the Upper Devonian Gogo Formation of Western Australia. First described by Miles & Young (1977) as a new species of the German genus Ctenurella. Long (1997) redescribed the German material and found major differences in the skull roof pattern so assigned it to a new genus, Austroptyctodus. This genus lacks spinal plates and has Ptyctodus-like toothplates.

The most significant discovery about Austroptyctodus is that one specimen depicts a female pregnant with 3 unborn embryos inside her, showing that like Materpiscis, also from Gogo, this genus was a live bearer that reproduced through internal fertilization.

== Feeding habits ==
Austroptyctodus fossil individuals have ostracods recovered in the abdominal region. These ostracods were related to nocturnal ones, suggesting it hunted at night.
