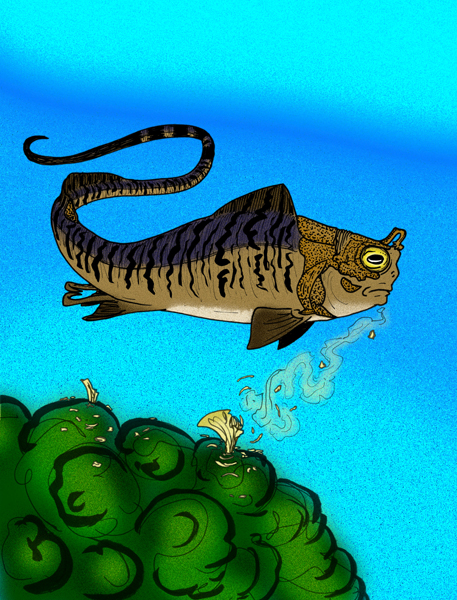
- Restoration of Kimbryanodus

Scientific classification
- Kingdom: Animalia
- Phylum: Chordata
- Class: †Placodermi
- Order: †Ptyctodontida
- Family: †Ptyctodontidae
- Genus: †Kimbryanodus; Trinajstic & Long, 2009
- Species: †K. williamburyensis

Binomial name
- †Kimbryanodus williamburyensis Trinajstic & Long, 2009

= Kimbryanodus =

Kimbryanodus Temporal range: Frasnian–Famennian

Extinct genus of fish

Kimbryanodus is a genus of extinct ptyctodontid placoderm fish from the Frasnian of Australia.These placoderms can be told apart from others due to the large eyes, crushing tooth plates, long bodies, reduced armor, and a superficial resemblance to holocephalid fish. The group is so far the only Placoderms known with sexually dimorphic features. The fossils occur as small three dimensional isolated plates. Because of these new specimens the Ptyctodontid grouping got a taxonomic classification, it found that the genus Rhamphodopsis to be the most basal taxa. They are divided by having the more basal taxa having a median dorsal spine, a simple spinal plate, and a simple V-shaped overlap of the anterior lateral and the anterior dorsolateral plates.
