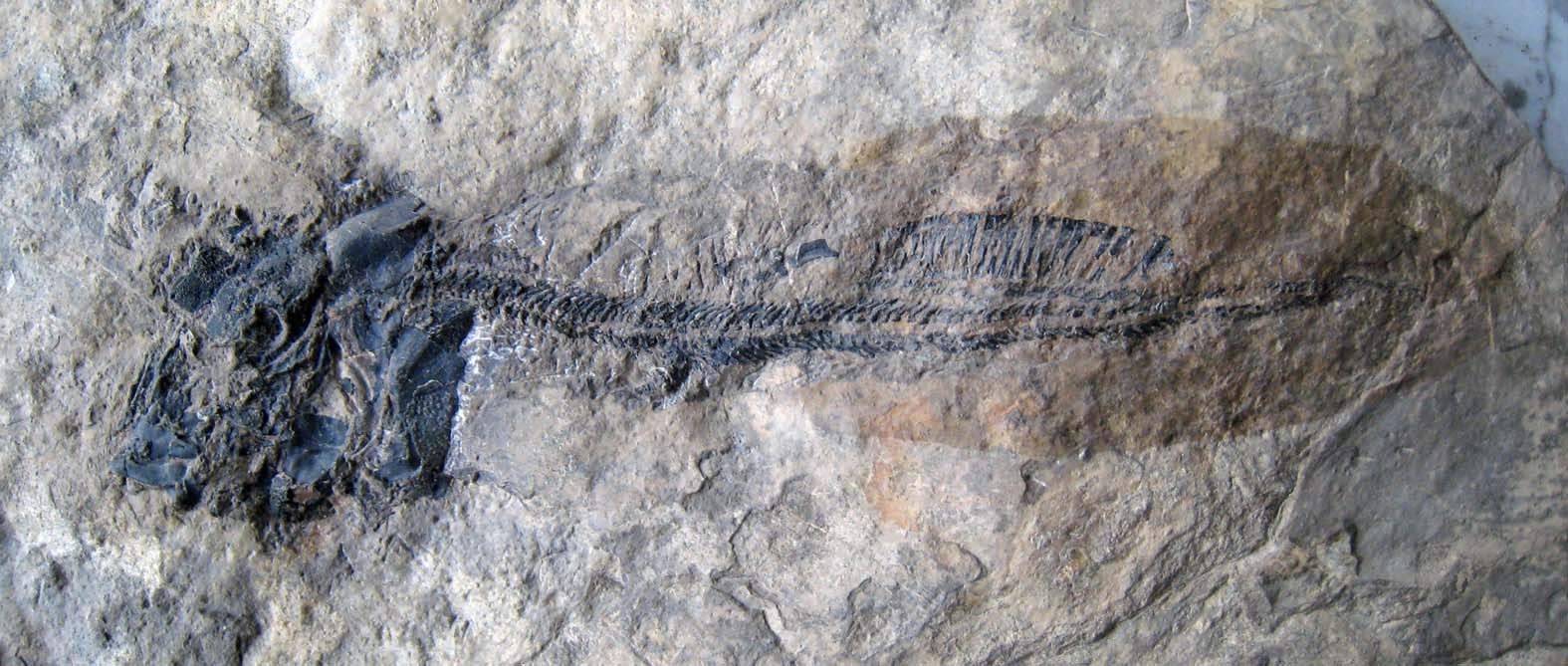
- fossil of C. gladbachensis

Scientific classification
- Kingdom: Animalia
- Phylum: Chordata
- Class: †Placodermi
- Order: †Ptyctodontida
- Family: †Ptyctodontidae
- Genus: †Ctenurella; Ørvig, 1960

Type species
- †Ctenurella gladbachensis Ørvig, 1960

= Ctenurella =

Ctenurella Temporal range: Late Devonian

Extinct genus of fishes

Ctenurella (from Greek: κτείς kteis, 'comb' and Greek: ουρά ourá, 'tail') is an extinct genus of ptyctodont placoderm from the Late Devonian of Germany. The first fossils were found in the Strunde valley in the Paffrather Kalkmulde.

== Description ==
As with other ptyctodonts, the armor of Ctenurella was reduced to a few thin plates on the head and shoulder region. It was also relatively small for a placoderm, at just 13 centimetres (5 in) in length. Ctenurella had two dorsal fins and the rear of the body was relatively long and low. Most ptyctodonts are presumed to have fed on the ocean floor, but the well-developed fins of this genus indicate that it probably also swam in open waters.

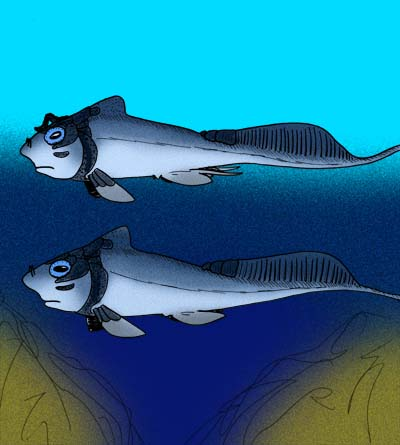
Reconstruction of the male (with head clasper) and female

Ctenurella had a long, whip-like tail, large eyes, and robust upper and lower jaw tooth plates. Males also had hook-shaped sex organs, known as claspers. Since analogous features are also found in the unrelated living chimaeras, chimaeras and ptyctodonts are thought to be an example of convergent evolution.

== Etymology ==
The specific name of the type species, C. gladbachensis, is a reference of the place Bergisch Gladbach, where it was founded.

== Taxonomy and evolution ==
The species Ctenurella gardineri was split off into the new genus Austroptyctodus by Long (1997) in his review of the Gogo ptyctodontid species, stipulating that the genus Ctenurella as only coming from the German sites. A new description of Ctenurella gladbachensis by Long (1997) showed that the original restoration had wrongly restored the skull-roof as the central bones do not in fact meet each other behind the nuchal plate.

Ptyctodontid placoderms recently have been shown to give birth to live young, with specimens of pregnant females from two genera, Materpiscis and Austroptyctodus, both from the Gogo Formation of Western Australia, showing the presence of unborn embryos within the mother fishes (Long et al. 2008)
