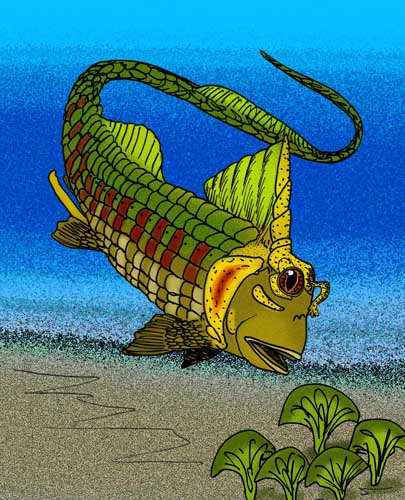
- Artist's reconstruction

Scientific classification
- Kingdom: Animalia
- Phylum: Chordata
- Class: †Placodermi
- Order: †Ptyctodontida
- Family: †Ptyctodontidae
- Genus: †Campbellodus; Miles & Young, 1977
- Species: †C. decipiens

Binomial name
- †Campbellodus decipiens Miles & Young, 1977

Synonyms
- Ctenurella decipiens

= Campbellodus =

Campbellodus Temporal range: Late Frasnian

Extinct genus of fishes

Campbellodus decipiens is an extinct ptyctodontid placoderm fish that lived around 380 million years ago (Late Devonian). Its fossil remains have been found preserved in perfect three-dimensional form from the Gogo Formation of Western Australia. Originally it was described from large tooth plates and isolated skull roof bones by Miles & Young (1977). Long (1995) restored the complete fish based on new material found at Gogo in the mid 1980s, and described by Long (1997).

Campbellodus has very short spinal plates, and is unusual in having a high dorsal spine formed by three median dorsal plates. The tooth plates are very robust and the upper plate has a high anterior spine.

== Sources ==
- Long, J.A. 1995. The Rise of Fishes - 500 Million Years of Evolution. Johns Hopkins University Press, Baltimore, 230pp.
- Long, J.A. 1997. Ptyctodontid fishes (Vertebrata, Placodermi) from the Late Devonian Gogo Formation, Western Australia, with a revision of the European genus Ctenurella Orvig, 1960. Geodiversitas 19(3): 515–555.
- Miles, R.S. & Young, G.C. 1977. Placoderm interrelationships reconsidered in the light of new ptyctodontids from Gogo, Western Australia. Linnean Society of London, Symposium Series 4: 123–198.
