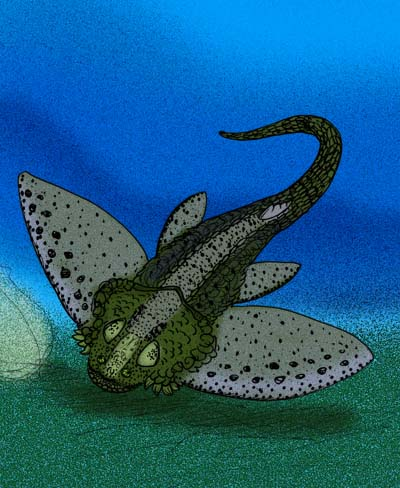
- Artist's reconstruction

Scientific classification
- Kingdom: Animalia
- Phylum: Chordata
- Class: Placodermi
- Order: Rhenanida
- Family: Asterosteidae
- Genus: Nefudina
- Species: N. qalibahensis

= Nefudina =

Nefudina Temporal range: Early Emsian

Extinct genus of fishes

Nefudina qalibahensis is a rhenanid placoderm from the early Emsian during the Early Devonian epoch of Northeastern Saudi Arabia. It is known from skull fragments and scales.
