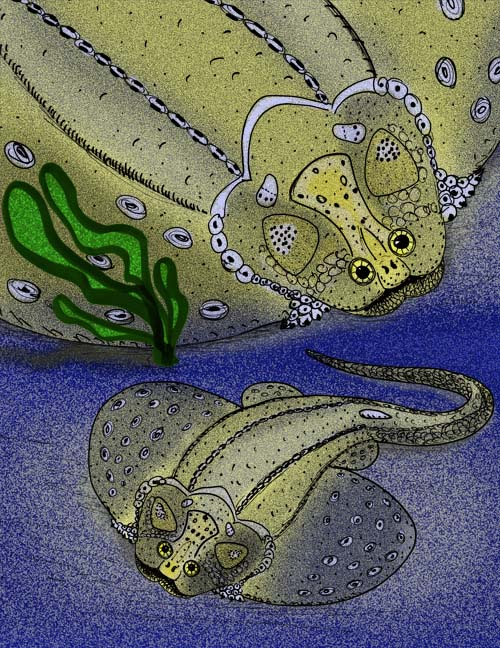
- Gemuendina stuertzi

Scientific classification
- Kingdom: Animalia
- Phylum: Chordata
- Class: †Placodermi
- Order: †Rhenanida; Broili, 1930

Genera
- †?Ohioaspis †Asterosteus †Nefudina †Gemuendina †Jagorina †Bolivosteus

= Rhenanida =

Rhenanida Temporal range: Emsian - Upper Frasnian

Extinct order of fishes

Rhenanida ("Rhine (fish)") is an order of scaly placoderms. Unlike most other placoderms, the rhenanids' armor was made up of a mosaic of unfused scales and tubercles. The patterns and components of this "mosaic" correspond to the plates of armor in other, more advanced placoderms, suggesting that the ancestral placoderm had armor made of unfused components, as well.

All rhenanids were flattened, ray-like, bottom-dwelling predators that lived in marine environments.

== Evolution ==
The rhenanids were once presumed to be the most primitive, or at least the closest to the ancestral placoderm, as their armor was made up of a mosaic of tubercles, as opposed to the solidified plates of "advanced" placoderms, such as antiarchs and arthrodires. However, comparing the skull anatomies of Jagorina pandora with those of antiarchs, the rhenanids are considered to be the sister group of the antiarchs (together with their respective Acanthothoracid relatives).

== Presence in the fossil record ==
The fossil record of Rhenanida is very sparse, with most fossils being isolated tubercles and skull fragments that are identified as being similar to Gemuendina stuertzi, the most well-known rhenanid, known from several specimens from the Hunsruck slates. Given the rhenanids' worldwide distribution, this paupacity probably did not reflect a scarcity of living individuals (when the order was alive), but reflects the fact that rhenanid armor disintegrated into isolated fragments, and scattered soon after the owner's demise. Most fossils of rhenanids are from the Early Devonian, primarily in the United States and Germany. The recently discovered Nefudina qalibahensis is known from Northeastern Saudi Arabia. Asterosteus stenocephalus is known from Mid Devonian Ohio. Another species of rhenanid was Bolivosteus chacomensis, of the Lower to Middle Devonian Malvinokaffric Fauna of Western Gondwana, in what is now Bolivia, South America. The youngest rhenanid, Jagorina pandora is known from Upper Devonian Germany.

== Taxonomy ==
There are five recognized species of rhenanids, in five genera, Asterosteus stenocephalus, Nefudina qalibahensis, Gemuendina stuertzi, Jagorina pandora, and Bolivosteus chacomensis. They are all placed within the family Asterosteidae, erected by Woodward in 1891: other families attributed to Rhenanida, i.e., Gemuendinidae and Jagorinidae, are considered synonyms.

A sixth genus, Ohioaspis, is of questionable status, as the first specimens were ichthyoliths that were originally described as being tubercles from a new species of Asterosteus. Later examinations of these tubercles have led to the formation of two camps of experts, one of which that believe the three recognized species of Ohioaspis were rhenanids, while the other suggests that they were actually some sort of ostracoderm agnathans.

== Literature ==
- Paleos Rhenanida
- Janvier, Philippe. Early Vertebrates Oxford, New York: Oxford University Press, 1998. ISBN 0-19-854047-7
- Long, John A. The Rise of Fishes: 500 Million Years of Evolution Baltimore: The Johns Hopkins University Press, 1996. ISBN 0-8018-5438-5
- Sepkoski, Jack (2002). "A compendium of fossil marine animal genera (Placodermi entry)". Bulletins of American Paleontology. 364: 560.
