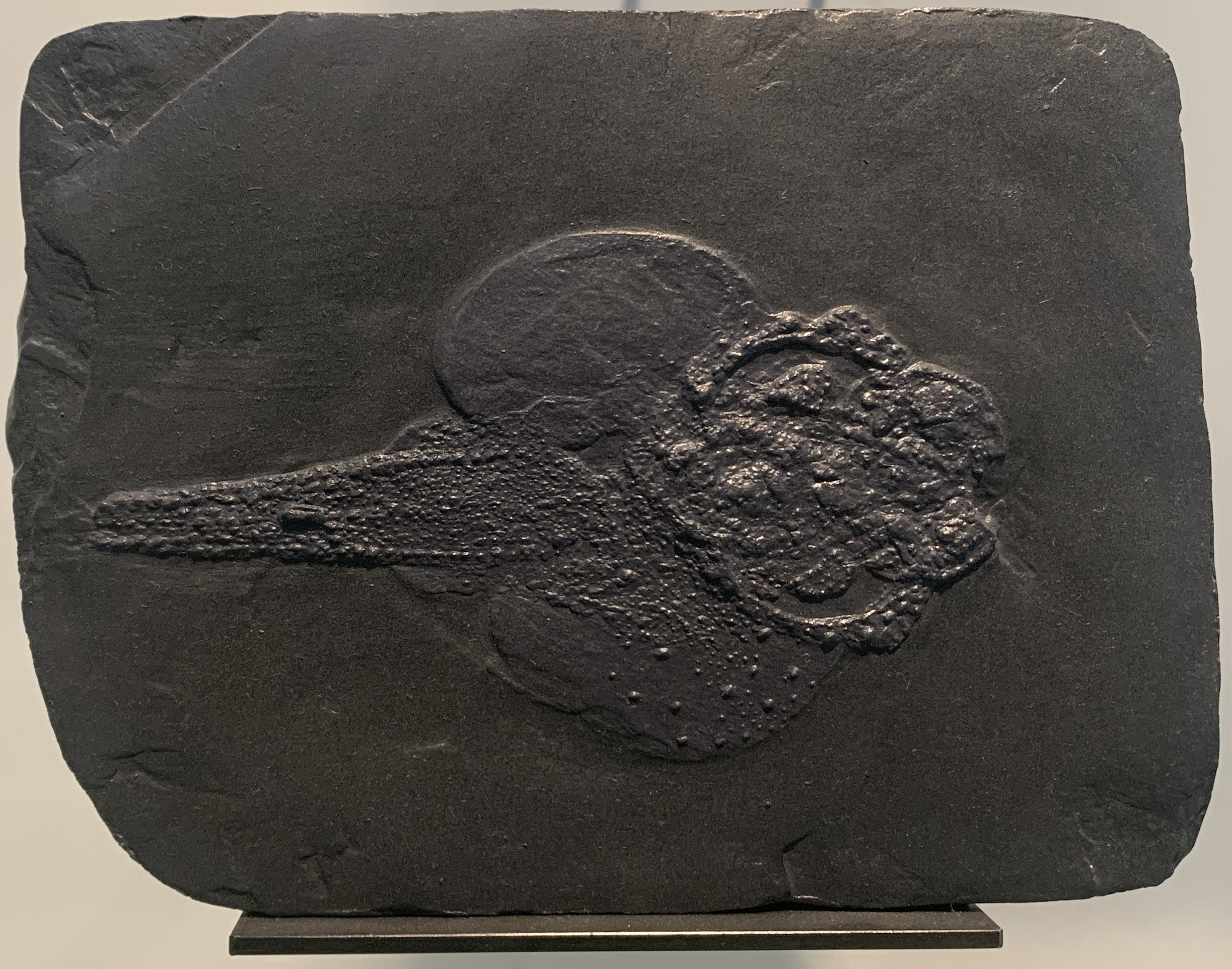
- Gemuendina stuertzi cast of a specimen from Hunsrück, Budenbach, Germany. At the AMNH

Scientific classification
- Kingdom: Animalia
- Phylum: Chordata
- Class: †Placodermi
- Order: †Rhenanida
- Family: †Asterosteidae
- Genus: †Gemuendina; Traquair, 1903
- Species: †G. stuertzi

Binomial name
- †Gemuendina stuertzi Traquair, 1903

Synonyms
- Broilina heroldi Stensiö, 1971

= Gemuendina =

Gemuendina Temporal range: Emsian

Extinct genus of fishes

Gemuendina stuertzi (named for Gemünden from where it was discovered) is a placoderm of the order Rhenanida, of the seas of Early Devonian Germany. In life, Gemuendina resembled a scaly ray with an upturned head, or a large-finned stargazer. G. stuertzi is often invoked as an example of convergent evolution- with its flat body and huge, wing-like pectoral fins it has a strong, albeit superficial similarity to rays. Unlike rays, however, both Gemuendina`s eyes and nostrils were placed atop the head, facing upward. Furthermore, G. stuertzi's upturned mouth would have enabled it to suction prey that swam overhead, rather than swallow sediment or suction prey out of the substrate like modern rays.

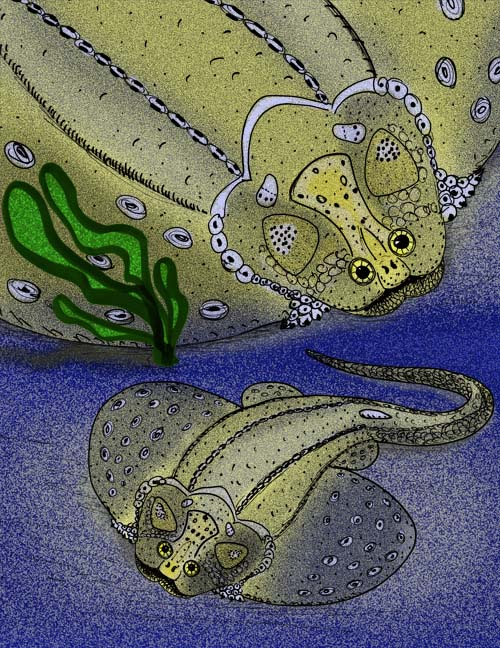
Gemuendina stuertzi reconstruction

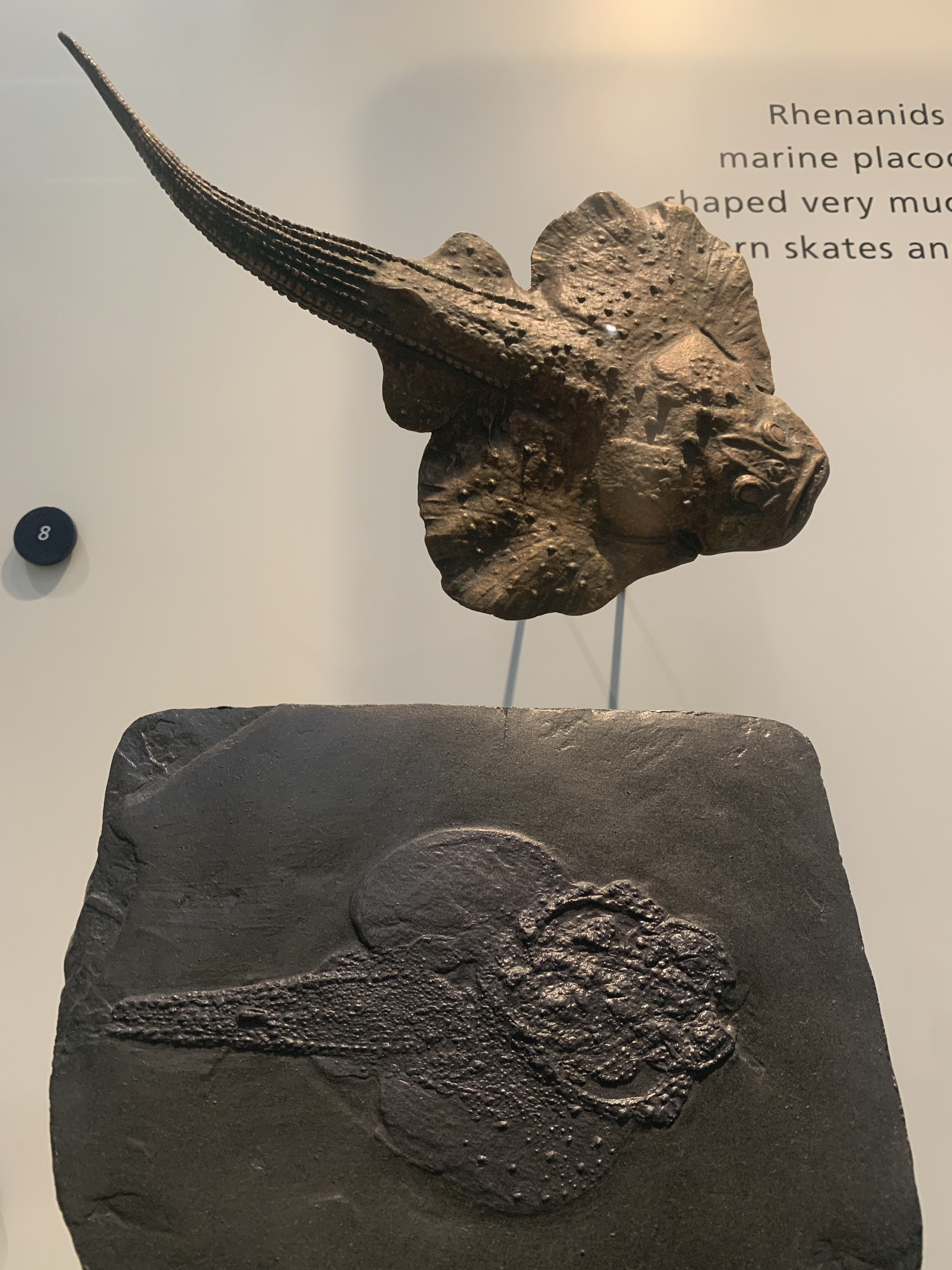
G. stuertzi cast next to a 1953 plaster model.

Unlike most other placoderm orders, such as the antiarchs or arthrodires, Gemuendina and its four other known relatives (or seven, if the three species of the ichthyolith genus Ohioaspis are confirmed to be rhenanids) had armor made up of a mosaic of unfused bony plates and scales. Because their armor was so fragile, few intact examples of rhenanids have survived in the fossil record. Because several regions of the Hunsruck lagerstätte were anoxic, thus free of scavenging organisms, intact, nearly pristine (albeit flattened) specimens of G. stuertzi have been found as a result. Also unlike other placoderms, it did not have the characteristic tooth plates of placoderms. Instead, it had star-shaped tubercle scales that allowed it to seize, then swallow fish and other animals that swam too close with its mouth.

Specimens of G. stuertzi ranged in size from 30 to 100 centimeters in length. In 1971, Erik Stensiö described a metre long specimen as a new species, "Broilina heroldi," which was later synonymized with Gemuendina.
