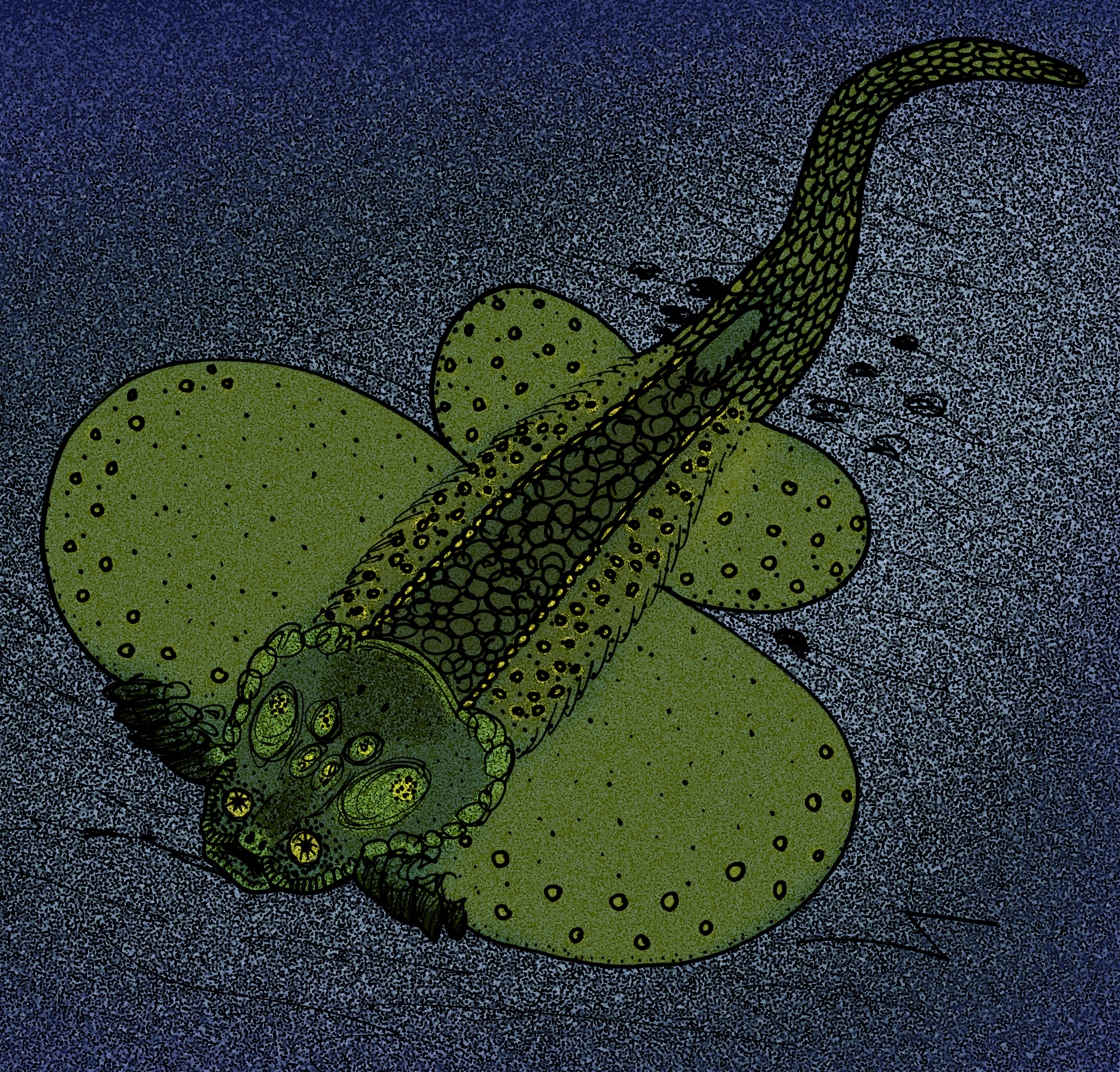
- Artist's reconstruction

Scientific classification
- Kingdom: Animalia
- Phylum: Chordata
- Class: †Placodermi
- Order: †Rhenanida
- Family: †Asterosteidae
- Genus: †Bolivosteus
- Species: †B. chacomensis

Binomial name
- †Bolivosteus chacomensis Goujet, Janvier & Suarez-Riglos, 1986

= Bolivosteus =

Bolivosteus Temporal range: Eifelian

Extinct genus of fishes

Bolivosteus chacomensis is a rhenanid placoderm from the Eifelian of Bolivia, and is the only placoderm known from the “Malvinokaffric” invertebrate faunas. The Malvinokaffric faunas represent a series of cold-water ecosystems near or at the South Pole during the Middle Devonian, and apparently lacked the presence of ammonoids, bryozoa, or colonial corals. B. chacomensis is known from skull fragments and scales.
