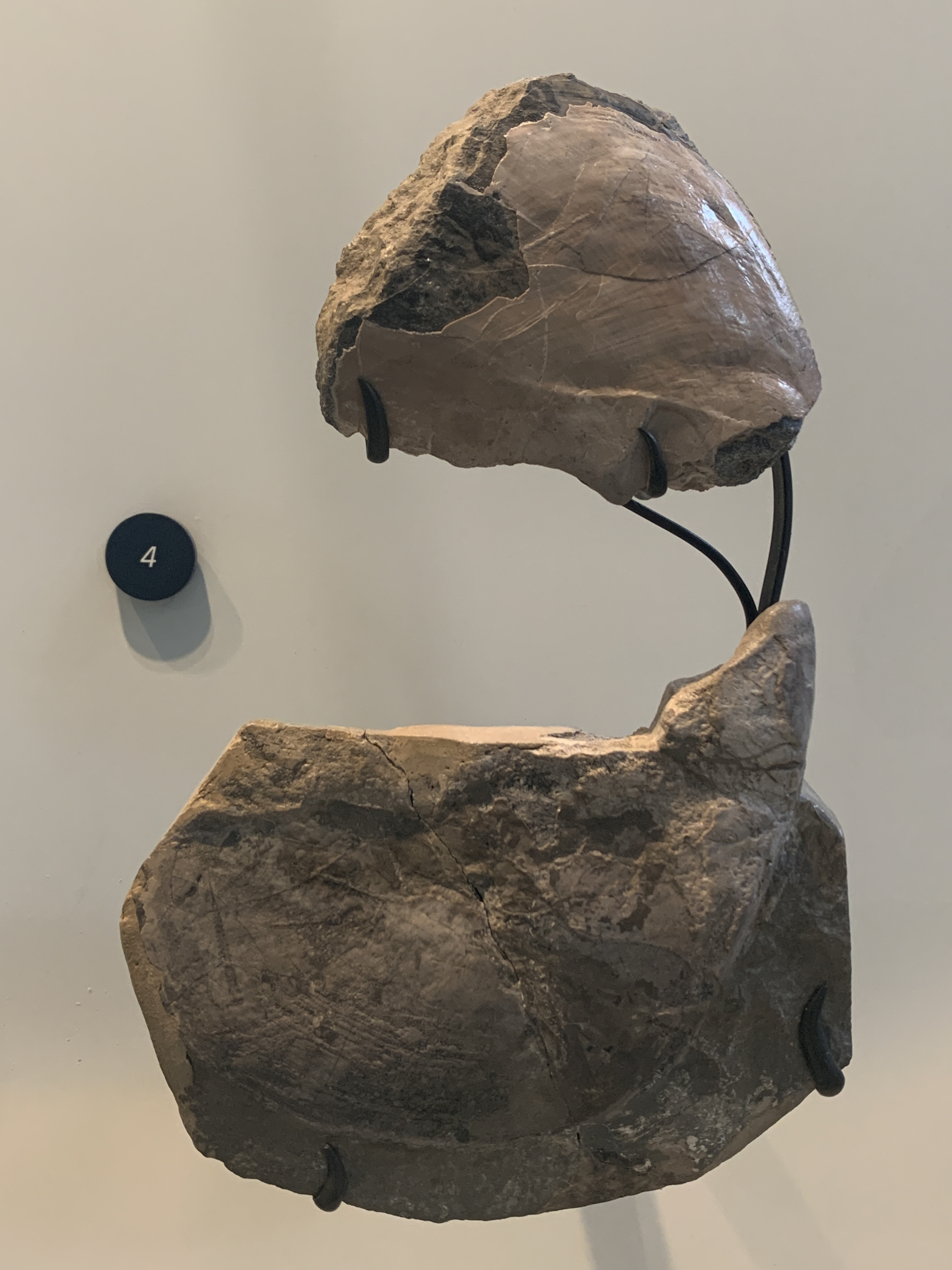
- Palaeomylus upper and lower tooth plates from two similarly sized individuals from Wisconsin and Ohio.

Scientific classification
- Kingdom: Animalia
- Phylum: Chordata
- Class: †Placodermi
- Order: †Ptyctodontida
- Family: †Ptyctodontidae
- Genus: †Palaeomylus; Woodward, 1891

Type species
- †Palaeomylus frangens (Newberry, 1878)

= Palaeomylus =

Extinct genus of fish

Palaeomylus (meaning 'ancient grinder') is an extinct Devonian ptychodontid placoderm fish.

There are seven species accepted in this genus:

- Palaeomylus hussakofi Bryant, 1935
- Palaeomylus lunaeformis Hussakof & Bryant, 1919
- Palaeomylus minor Bryant, 1935
- Palaeomylus predator Eastman, 1898
- Palaeomylus crassus (Newberry, 1873)
- Palaeomylus frangens (Newberry, 1878)
- Palaeomylus greenei (Newberry, 1889)

== Etymology ==
The generic name is derived from Greek (Palaeo, meaning "ancient") and (mylos, meaning "grinder").

Not to be confused with the junior homonym Palaeomylus (Meng, Wyss, Hu, Wang, Bowen & Koch, 2005), which is an early diverging member of the mammal group Glires.

== Discovery ==
P. greenei, P. crassus, and the type species P. frangens were originally classified as a species of Rhynchodus, before being moved to a new genus, Palaeomylus, in 1891. The first was found in Wisconsin, while the latter two species were found in Ohio. P. predator was found near Gerolstein, Germany.
