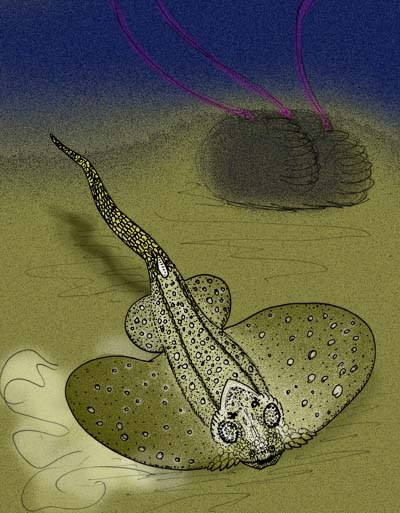
- Artist's reconstruction of A. stenocephalus

Scientific classification
- Kingdom: Animalia
- Phylum: Chordata
- Class: †Placodermi
- Order: †Rhenanida
- Family: †Asterosteidae
- Genus: †Asterosteus; Newberry, 1875

Type species
- Asterosteus stenocephalus Newberry, 1875

Species
- Asterosteus stenocephalus; Asterosteus sp.

= Asterosteus =

Asterosteus Temporal range: Eifelian

Extinct genus of fishes

Asterosteus is a genus of rhenanid placoderm from the Eifelian. The type species, A. stenocephalus, is known from an incomplete skull from Middle Devonian strata in Ohio. What may be a second species ("Asterosteus sp. Schmidtt 1963") is described from fragments decorated with star-shaped tubercules from the Eifelian-aged Gebze beds of Turkey.

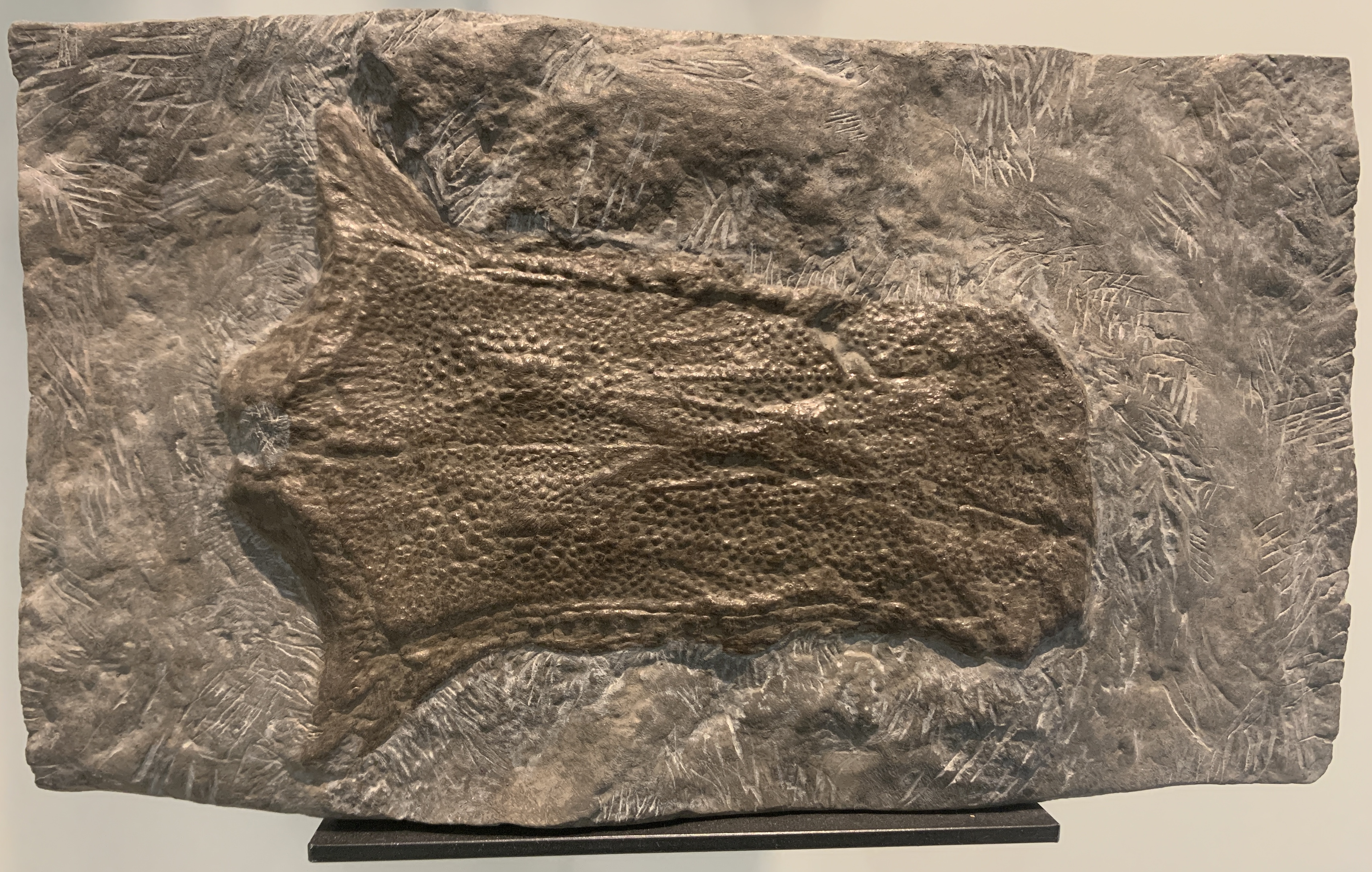
Asterosteus stenocephalus head shield cast.
