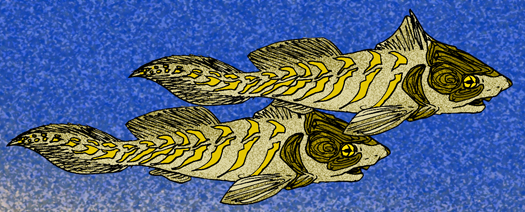

Scientific classification
- Kingdom: Animalia
- Phylum: Chordata
- Class: †Placodermi
- Order: †Ptyctodontida
- Family: †Ptyctodontidae
- Genus: †Rhamphodopsis; Watson, 1934

Type species
- †Rhamphodopsis thrieplandi Watson, 1934

Other species
- R. trispinatus Watson, 1938

= Rhamphodopsis =

Rhamphodopsis Temporal range: Middle Devonian

Extinct genus of fishes

Rhamphodopsis is a genus of extinct ptyctodont placoderm from the Middle Devonian Old Red Sandstone of Scotland.

== Species ==
There are two species of Rhamphodopsis recognized.

=== R. thrieplandi ===
This is the type species, and the smaller of the two described species, the adult total length being up to 7 centimeters. The median dorsal spine is shorter than the anterior lateral spines.

=== R. trispinatus ===
This is a much larger, more robust species, the adult total length being up to 12 centimeters. The main way to distinguish small individuals of R. trispinatus from individuals of R. thrieplandi is that the median dorsal and anterior lateral spines of R. trispinatus are both proportionally equal lengths and are proportionally longer than those of R. thrieplandi.
