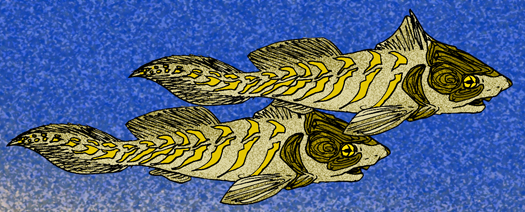
- Reconstruction of Rhamphodopsis threiplandi

Scientific classification
- Kingdom: Animalia
- Phylum: Chordata
- Class: †Placodermi
- Order: †Ptyctodontida; Gross, 1932
- Family: †Ptyctodontidae; Woodward, 1891

Genera
- See text

Synonyms
- Order synonymy: Rhynchodonta Jaekel 1907a; Ptyctodontiformes Berg 1940b; Aulacosteida Fowler 1965; Family synonymy: Aulacosteidae Fowler 1947

= Ptyctodontida =

Ptyctodontida Temporal range: Devonian

Extinct order of fishes

The ptyctodontids ("folded-teeth") are placoderms of the order Ptyctodontida, containing the family Ptyctodontidae. With their big heads, big eyes, reduced armor and long bodies, the ptyctodontids bore a superficial resemblance to modern day chimaeras (Holocephali). Their armor was reduced to a pattern of small plates around the head and neck. Like the extinct and related acanthothoracids, and the living and unrelated holocephalians, most of the ptyctodontids are thought to have lived near the sea bottom and preyed on shellfish.

On account of their radically reduced armor, some paleontologists have suggested that the Ptyctodontida were not actually placoderms, but actual holocephalians, some primitive group of elasmobranch fish, or even were the ancestors of the holocephalians, including the chimaeras. Thorough anatomical examinations of whole fossil specimens reveal that the profound similarities between these two groups are actually very superficial. The major differences between them were that holocephalians have shagreen on their skin and ptyctodontids did not, that the armored plates and scales of holocephalians are made of dentine, and the armored plates and scales of ptyctodontids were made of bone, the anatomy of the craniums of holocephalians is more similar to sharks, and that of ptyctodontids were more similar to those of other placoderms, and, most importantly, the holocephalians have true teeth, while the ptyctodonts had beak-like tooth-plates.

The Ptyctodontida were the only known group of placoderms that were recognizably sexually dimorphic, in that the males had hook-like growths on their pelvic fins that were analogous to the clasping organs found in male sharks, and chimaeras. Paleontologists believe that the males of the ancestral placoderm had pelvic claspers, but the claspers were lost in the evolutionary development of each of the placoderm orders, save for the ptyctodontids (there are too few whole specimens of the primitive Stensioella heintzi to tell if the males of that species had claspers or not).

Because they had reduced armor, the ptyctodontids were once thought to be the most primitive of the placoderms. Indeed, there has been the idea that the placoderms had a gradient, of sorts, from the least armored, and most primitive forms, to the heavily armored, most advanced forms. During the 1980s and '90's, ptyctodont skulls were compared with skulls from other orders. From these analyses, this idea of a gradient from least armored to most armored in placoderms was discarded. Now, the ptyctodonts are regarded as the sister group of the Arthrodira and Phyllolepida.

== Genera ==
The following genera are recognized in the family Ptyctodontidae:

- Genus Austroptyctodus Long, 1997
- Genus Borysthenoplax Plax, 2019
- Genus Campbellodus Miles & Young, 1977
- Genus Chelyophorus Agassiz, 1844b [=Cheliophorus Stensiö, 1969b]
- Genus Ctenurella Ørvig, 1960
- Genus Denisonodus Johnson and Elliott, 1996
- Genus Desmoporella Ørvig, 1971
- Genus Eczematolepis S. A. Miller, 1892a [=Acantholepis Newberry, 1875a; =Phlyctaenacanthus Eastman, 1898b]
- Genus Goniosteus Gross, 1933d
- Genus Kimbryanodus Trinajstic & Long, 2009
- Genus Materpiscis Long, Trinajstic, Young & Senden, 2008
- Genus Meeksiella Trinajstic, Long, Ivanov & Mark-Kurik, 2019
- Genus Palaeomylus Woodward, 1891a
- Genus Ptyctodopsis Denison, 1985
- Genus Ptyctodus Pander, 1858a [=Aulacosteus Eichwald, 1846c; =Rinodus Newberry & Worthen, 1866a; =Paraptyctodus Carter, 1942]
- Genus Rhamphodopsis Watson, 1934a
- Genus Rhynchodus Newberry, 1873 [=Ramphodus Jaekel, 1903g; =Rhamphodus Jaekel, 1906d; =Rhamphodontus Jaekel, 1906; =Rhynchodontus Jaekel, 1919a; =Rhynchosteus Jaekel, 1925d; =Rhynchognathus Jaekel, 1929b; =Ringinia Whitley, 1950]
- Genus Tollodus Mark-Kurik, 1977

== Gallery ==
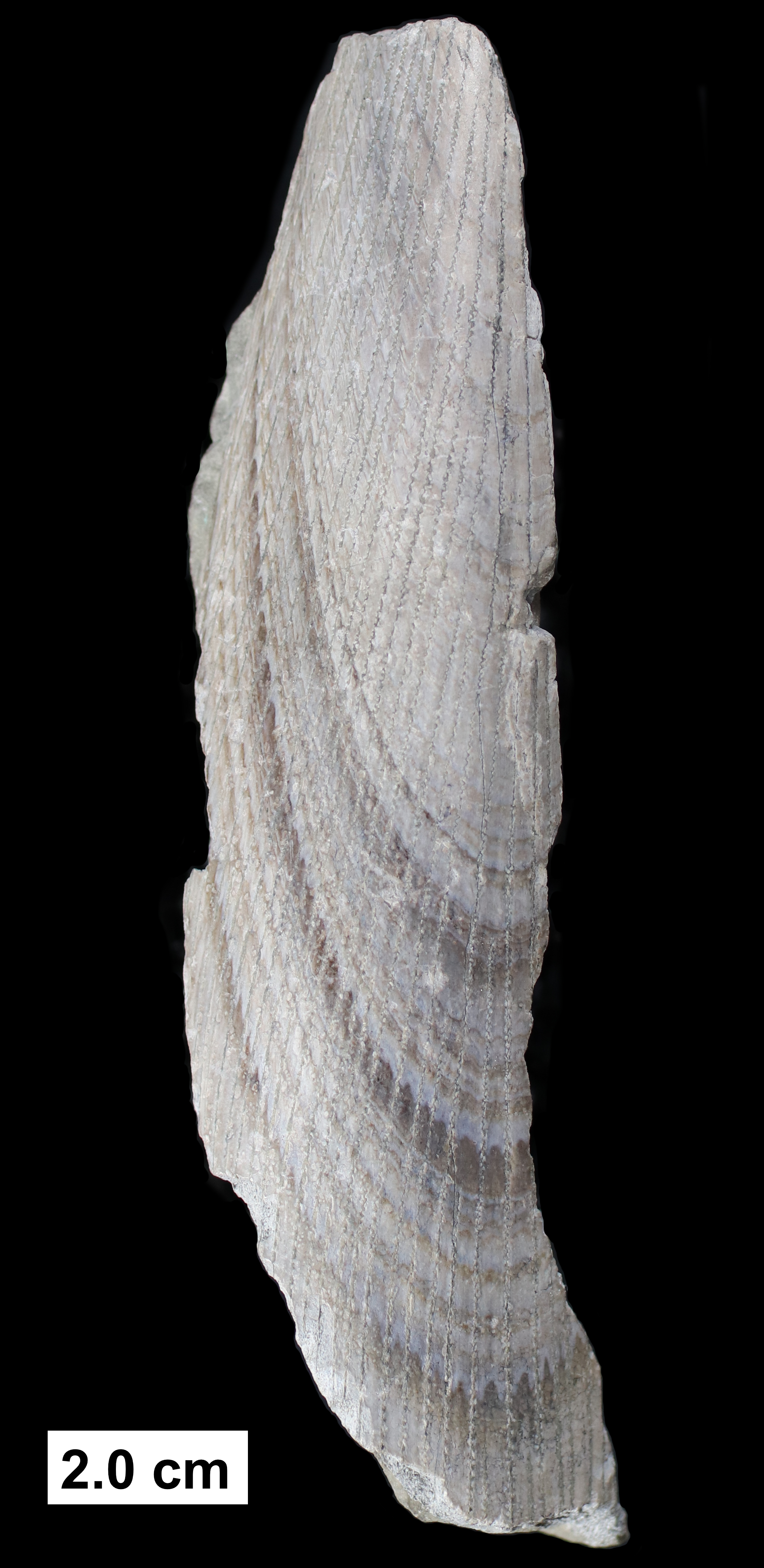
Fin spine of the ptyctodont, Gamphacanthus, showing color patterns; from the Middle Devonian of Wisconsin.

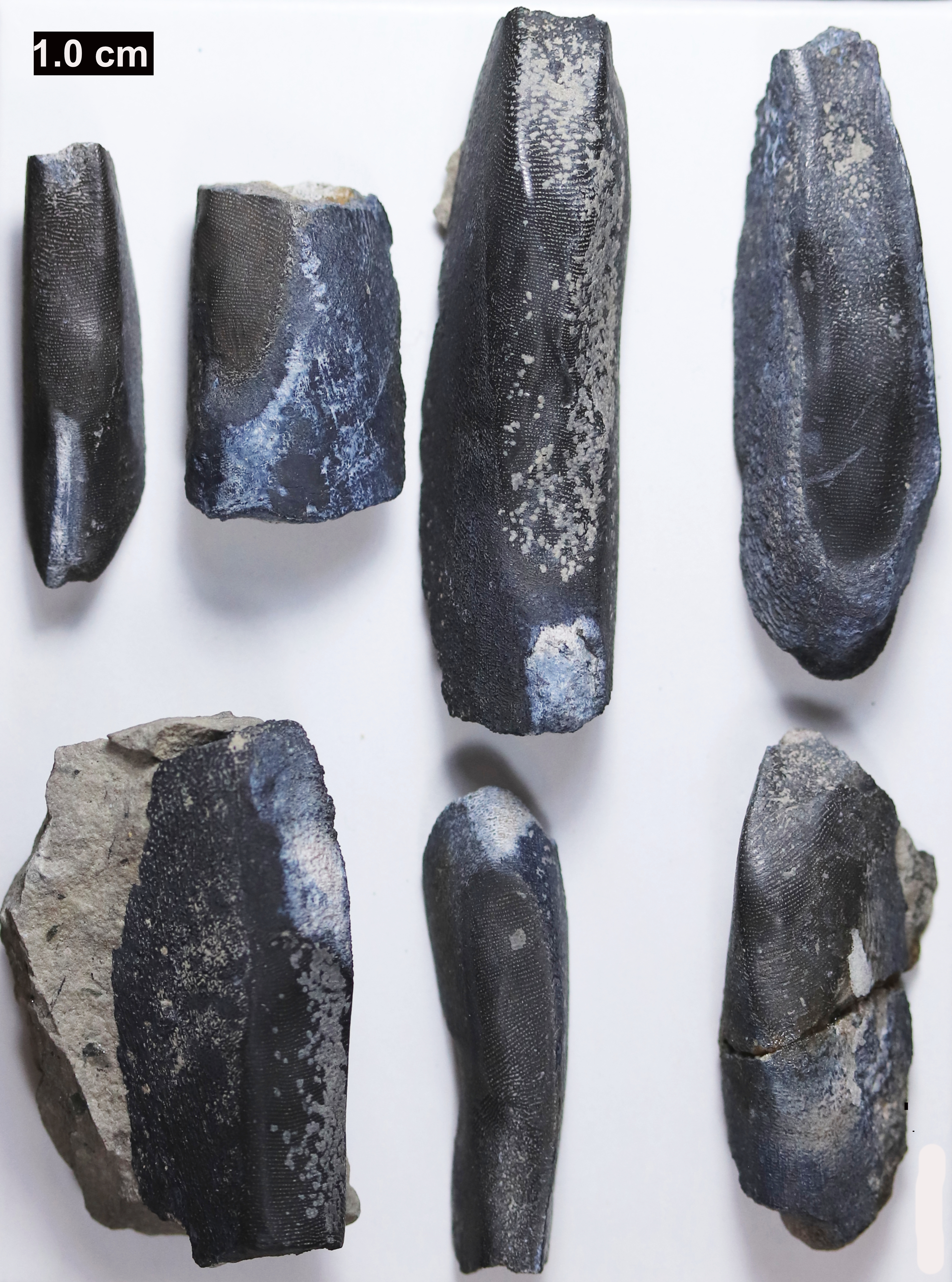
Tooth plates from the ptyctodont Ptyctodus ferox, from the Middle Devonian of Wisconsin. Note the grinding surfaces.

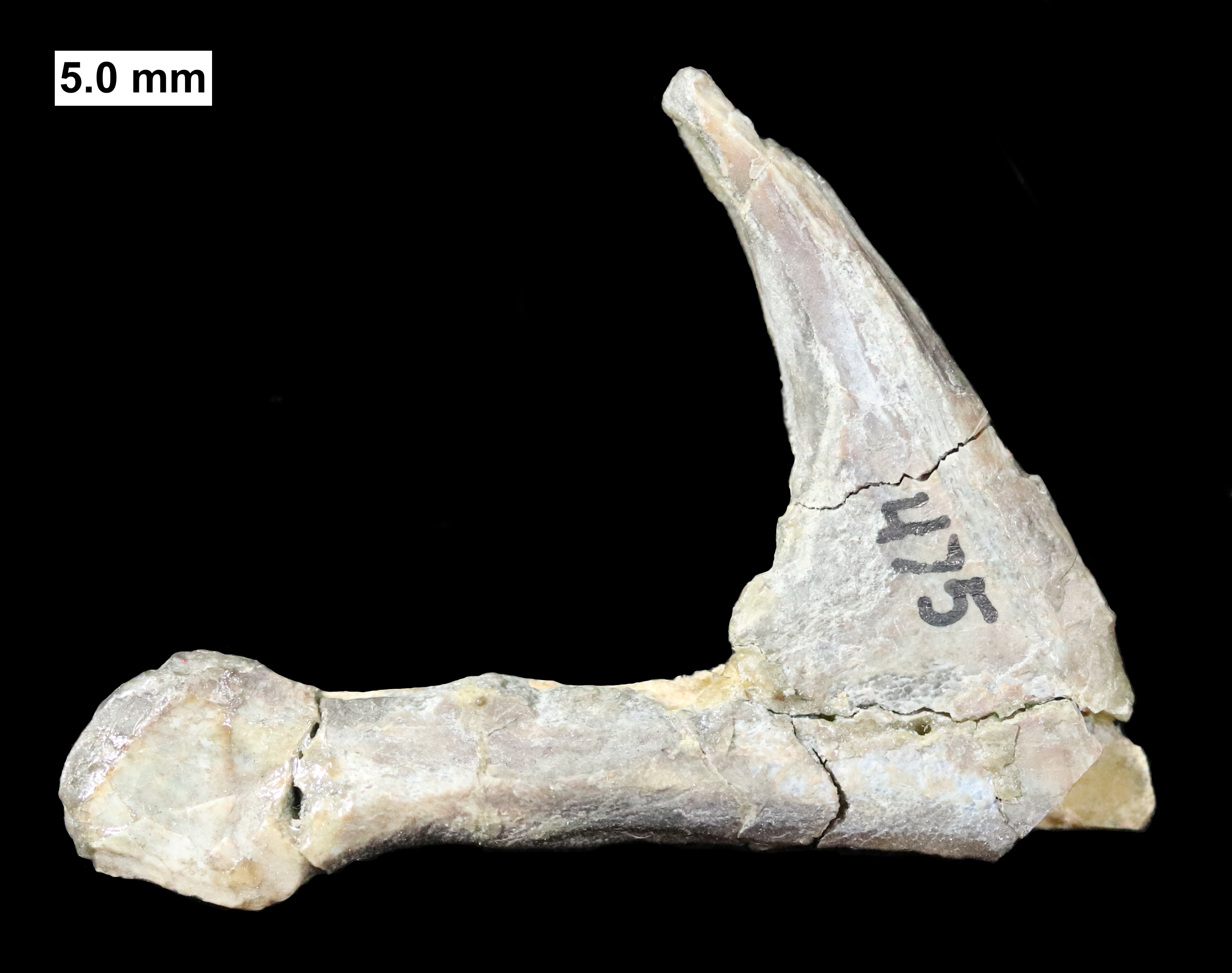
Beak-like tooth plate of a ptyctodont from the Middle Devonian of Wisconsin.
