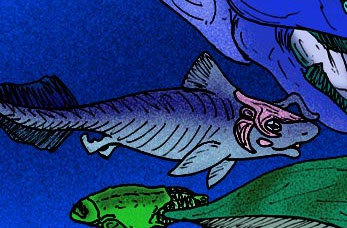
- Ptyctodus

Scientific classification
- Kingdom: Animalia
- Phylum: Chordata
- Class: †Placodermi
- Order: †Ptyctodontida
- Family: †Ptyctodontidae
- Genus: †Ptyctodus; Pander, 1858

Species
- Ptyctodus bradyi Ptyctodus calceolus Ptyctodus compressus Ptyctodus ferox Ptyctodus molaris Ptyctodus panderi

= Ptyctodus =

Ptyctodus Temporal range: late Devonian 383.7–360.7 Ma

Extinct genus of fishes

Ptyctodus is an extinct armour-plated fish of the late Devonian. Ptyctodus belongs to the family Ptyctodontidae and is of the class Placodermi. They share a close resemblance to modern day chimaeras (Holocephali). Fossils of this armour-plated fish have been found in locations such as in Russia, the Michigan Basis, and Arizona, United States.

== Description and paleobiology ==
Ptyctodus species come in a variety of different sizes, measured data shows three specimens being 94 millimeters, 24 millimeters, 22 millimeters in length, 23 millimeters, 6 millimeters, 4 millimeter in height, and 18 millimeters, 7 millimeters, and 4 millimeters in thickness. Through time, an evolutionary morphological trait is that the species within Ptyctodontidae reduce the dermal armour. The dentition of the Ptyctodus has dental elements that are very similarly observed in chimaeroids. Its dental plates are compressed into a thin cutting edge behind the symphysis and measure 3 inches in thickness and several inches in length. The tritors are expressed as fine punctae in parallel rows. Ptyctodus teeth are very close together in a way that they are like a fish tooth conglomerate. They were also armed with dorsal fin spines closely seen in Hetercanthus and Phlyctaenacanthus. Just like the other members of the family of Ptyctodontidae, there is a sexual dimorphism between the genders of Ptyctodus in the pelvic region where the characteristics are different; males had claspers, while females had large scale like pelvic fins along with their endoskeleton.

Ptyctodus lived in a nektonic carnivore type-ecology and in carbonate, lagoonal, and shallow subtidal environments. Due to structure and shape of the teeth Ptyctodus would easily be able to crush shellfish like organisms at the bottom of the ocean floors, feeding mainly off of that. They also must seem to have been very agile swimmers, able to escape predators, like arthrodires.

== Species ==
Species of the Ptyctodus:

- Ptyctodus bradyi was discovered by the basis of two tooth plates in 1942 by Hussakof on Mt. Elden in Arizona.
- Ptyctodus calceolus
- Ptyctodus compressus first documentation was in 1870
- Ptyctodus ferox
- Ptyctodus molaris
- Ptyctodus panderi

== Gallery ==
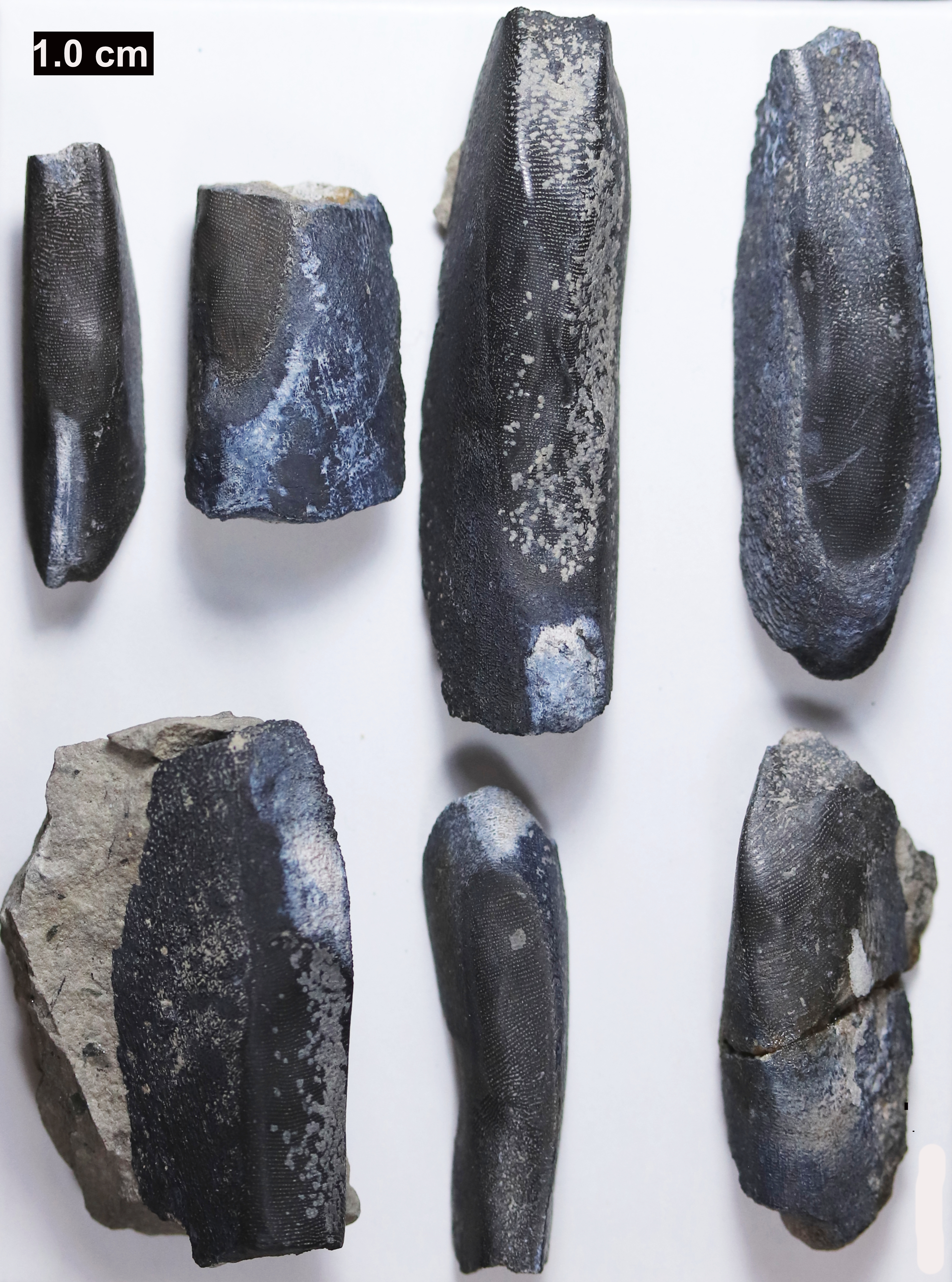
Gnathal plates of Ptyctodus ferox showing grinding surfaces; from the Middle Devonian of Wisconsin.
