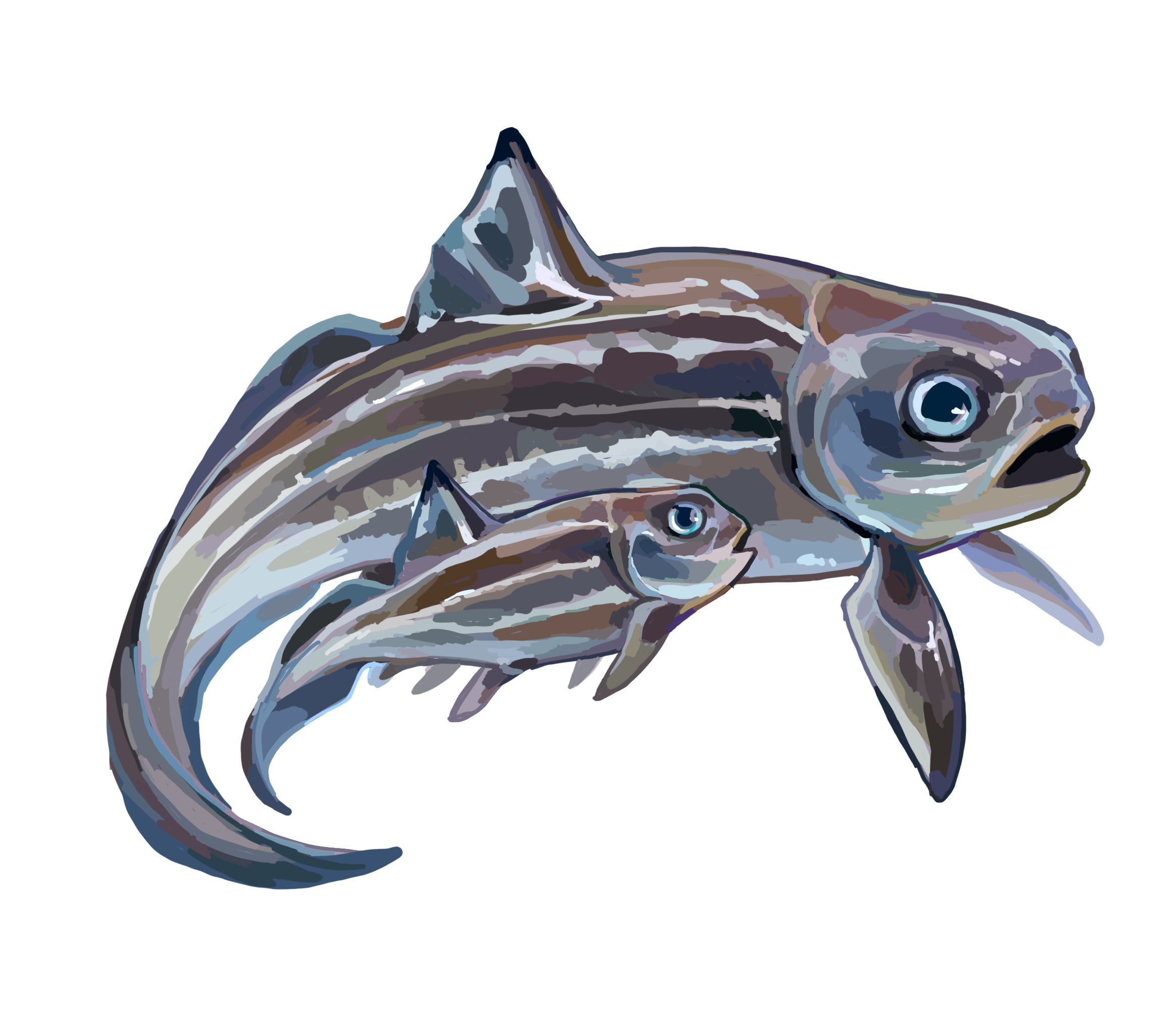
- Artist's reconstruction of M. attenboroughi

Scientific classification
- Kingdom: Animalia
- Phylum: Chordata
- Class: †Placodermi
- Order: †Ptyctodontida
- Family: †Ptyctodontidae
- Genus: †Materpiscis; Long et al., 2008
- Species: †M. attenboroughi

Binomial name
- †Materpiscis attenboroughi Long et al., 2008

= Materpiscis =

Materpiscis Temporal range: Late Devonian (Frasnian), 380 Ma

Extinct genus of fishes

Materpiscis (Latin for mother fish) is a genus of ptyctodontid placoderm from the Late Devonian located at the Gogo Formation of Western Australia. Known from only one specimen, it is unique in having an unborn embryo present inside the mother, with remarkable preservation of a mineralised placental feeding structure (umbilical cord). This makes Materpiscis the oldest known vertebrate to show viviparity, or giving birth to live young.

== Discovery and naming ==
The holotype was found in the Kimberley area of northern Western Australia by Lindsay Hatcher during the 2005 expedition to the Gogo led by John Long of Museum Victoria. Fossils from the Gogo Formation are preserved in limestone nodules, so dilute acetic acid is used to dissolve the surrounding limestone and reveal the fossil, often preserved in three dimensions with minimal distortion.

The species was named Materpiscis attenboroughi in honour of David Attenborough who first drew attention to the significance of the Gogo fish sites in his 1979 series Life on Earth.

== Paleobiology ==
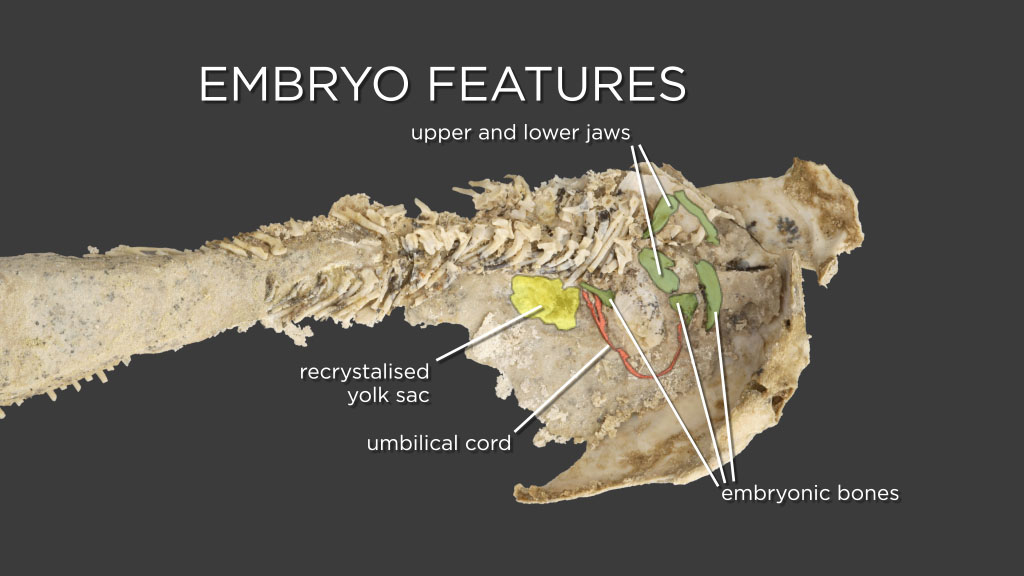
Fossilised embryo features

Materpiscis would have been about 11 inches (28 cm) long and had powerful crushing tooth plates to grind up its prey, possibly hard shelled invertebrates like clams or corals.

Examination of the tail section of the holotype led to the discovery of the partially ossified skeleton of a juvenile Materpiscis and the mineralised umbilical cord. The team published their findings in 2008. The juvenile Materpiscis was about 25 percent of its adult size. The large size of the embryo relative to the mother indicates that the young of this fish were born well-formed, a strategy that may have evolved to counter predation from other larger fishes. The ptyctodontid fishes are the only group of placoderms to display sexual dimorphism, where males have clasping organs and females have smooth pelvic fin bases. It had long been suspected that they reproduced using internal fertilisation, but finding fossilised embryos inside both Materpiscis and in a similar form also from Gogo, Austroptyctodus, proved the deduction was true.

== In popular culture ==
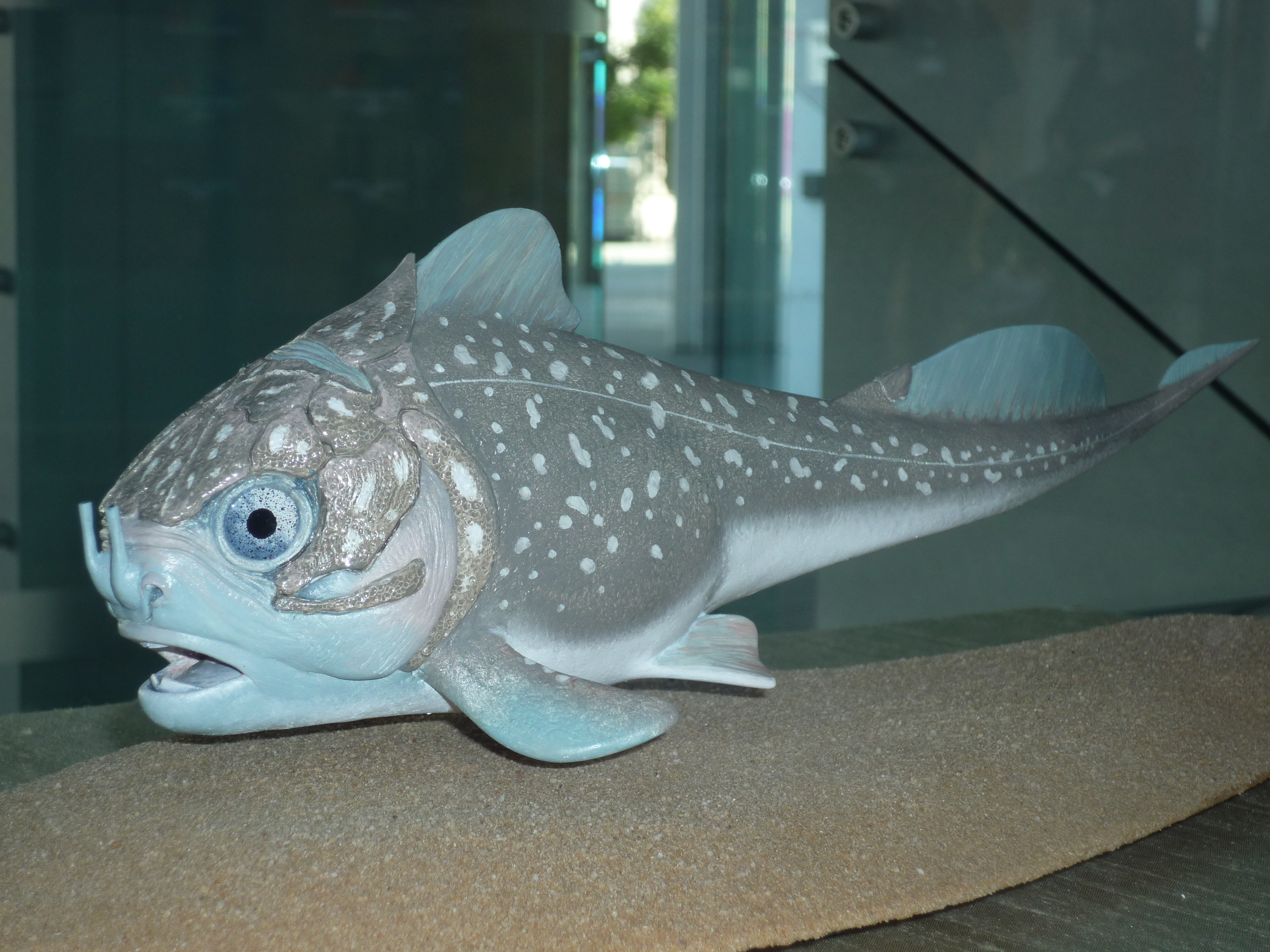
Model of Materpiscis on display at Museum Victoria, Australia

- Materpiscis attenboroughi was selected as one of "The Top 10 New Species" described in 2008 by The International Institute for Species Exploration at Arizona State University and an international committee of taxonomists.

== See also ==
- Austroptyctodus, another viviparous ptyctodont placoderm from the Gogo Reef
- Incisoscutum, a viviparous arthrodire placoderm from the Gogo Reef
- Gogonasus
- Onychodus
- List of things named after David Attenborough and his works
