= Ichthyolith =

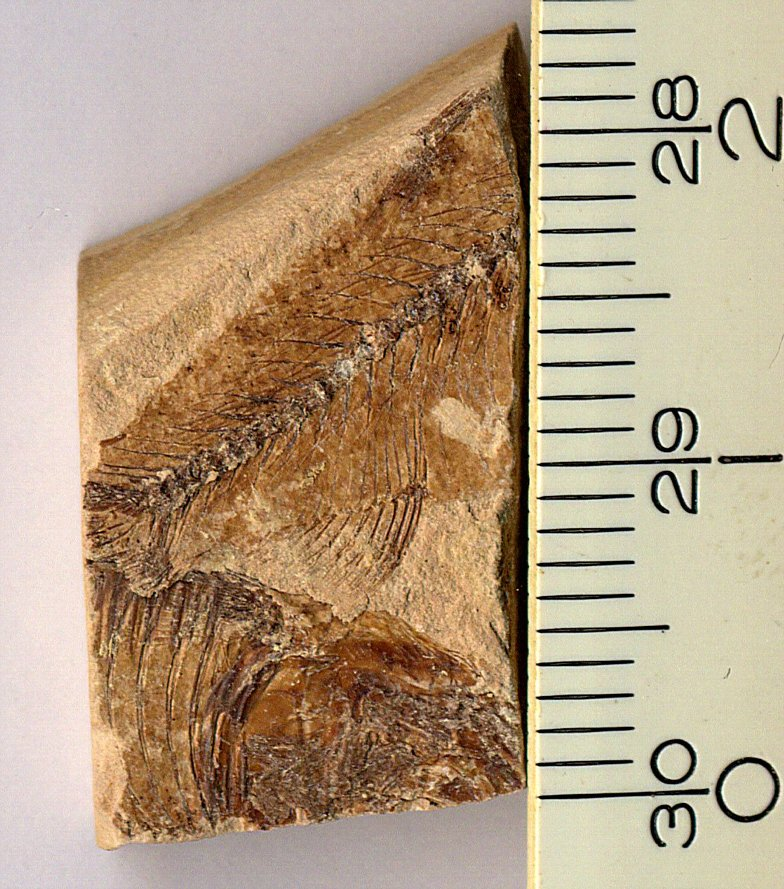
Fossil found in Wyoming.

An ichthyolith (from Ancient Greek ἰχθύς (ikhthús), meaning "fish", and λίθος (líthos), meaning "stone") is any disarticulated remains of a fish found in the fossil record, most often a scale, denticle or tooth. Ichthyoliths are found in nearly all marine sediment.

The term was coined by Doyle, Kennedy and Riedel (1974) to denote 'fish skeletal debris'.

The term 'stratignathy', proposed in the same paper for the time relationships of ichthyoliths, did not gain currency.
