= 2015 in paleoichthyology =

This list of fossil fishes described in 2015 is a list of new taxa of jawless vertebrates, placoderms, acanthodians, fossil cartilaginous fishes, bony fishes and other fishes of every kind that have been described during the year 2015, as well as other significant discoveries and events related to paleontology of fishes that occurred in the year 2015. The list only includes taxa at the level of genus or species.

== Research ==
- A study of the body sizes of Devonian and Carboniferous vertebrates (jawless vertebrates, placoderms, acanthodians, cartilaginous fishes, ray-finned fishes and sarcopterygians, including tetrapods) is published by Sallan & Galimberti (2015), who conclude that following the Hangenberg event the majority of vertebrate lineages experienced persistent reductions in body size for at least 36 million years, and that the few large-bodied survivors of the Hangenberg event failed to diversify, while small-bodied survivors gave rise to all subsequent vertebrate lineages.
- A study on the skull anatomy of Acanthodes and its implications for inferring the phylogenetic placement of acanthodians is published by Brazeau & de Winter (2015).
- A study on the fossil specimens considered to be either decomposed or immature specimens of Triazeugacanthus affinis is published by Chevrinais, Cloutier & Sire (2015), who reinterpret the variation initially thought to be caused by various degrees of decomposition as corresponding to ontogenetic changes.
- A study on the development of saw-teeth in the Cretaceous ray Schizorhiza stromeri is published by Smith et al. (2015).
- Three large mackerel shark vertebrae, interpreted as belonging to a single individual with a calculated total body length of 6.3 m, are described from the Lower Cretaceous Duck Creek Formation (Texas, United States) by Frederickson, Schaefer & Doucette-Frederickson (2015).

== New taxa ==
=== Jawless vertebrates ===
Name	Novelty	Status	Authors	Age	Unit	Location	Notes	Images
Ciderius	Gen. et sp. nov	Valid	Van der Brugghen	Silurian (early Wenlock)	Fish Bed Formation	United Kingdom	A member of Euphaneropidae. The type species is Ciderius cooperi.	
Mitraspis	Gen. et sp. nov	Valid	Elliott, Schultze & Blieck	Devonian (Lochkovian)	Drake Bay Formation	Canada	A pteraspid heterostracan. The type species is Mitraspis cracens.	
Rhegmaspis	Gen. et sp. nov	Valid	Gai et al.	Devonian (Pragian)	Posongchong Formation	China	A gantarostrataspidid huananaspidiform galeaspid. The type species is Rhegmaspis xiphoidea.	
Siyingia perlatuspinosa	Sp. nov	Valid	Si, Gai & Zhao	Devonian (Lochkovian)	Xishancun Formation	China	A polybranchiaspidid galeaspid, a species of Siyingia.	
Tolypelepis mielnikensis	Sp. nov	Disputed	Dec	Silurian (Pridoli)		Poland	A member of Tolypelepidida, a species of Tolypelepis. Märss (2019) considered it to be a junior synonym of T. undulata.	

=== Placoderms ===
Name	Novelty	Status	Authors	Age	Unit	Location	Notes	Images
Driscollaspis	Gen. et sp. nov	Valid	Rücklin, Long & Trinajstic	Late Devonian		Morocco	A selenosteid arthrodire. The type species is Driscollaspis pankowskiorum.	
Groenlandaspis potyi	Sp. nov	Valid	Olive, Prestianni & Dupret	Devonian (late Famennian)		Belgium	A phlyctaeniid arthrodire, a species of Groenlandaspis.	
Grossilepis rikiki	Sp. nov	Valid	Olive	Devonian (late Famennian)		Belgium	A member of Antiarchi, a species of Grossilepis.	
Pauropetalichthys	Gen. et sp. nov	Valid	Pan et al.	Devonian (late Emsian)		China	A quasipetalichthyid petalichthyid. The type species is Pauropetalichthys magnoculus.	
Remigolepis durnalensis	Sp. nov	Valid	Olive	Devonian (Famennian)		Belgium	A member of Antiarchi, a species of Remigolepis.	
Turrisaspis strudensis	Sp. nov	Valid	Olive et al.	Devonian (late Famennian)		Belgium	A relative of Groenlandaspis, a species of Turrisaspis.	

=== Acanthodians ===
Name	Novelty	Status	Authors	Age	Unit	Location	Notes	Images
Erymnacanthus	Gen. et sp. nov	Valid	Blais, Hermus & Wilson	Devonian (Lochkovian)		Canada	An ischnacanthid ischnacanthiform. The type species is Erymnacanthus clivus.	
Euryacanthus	Gen. et sp. nov	Valid	Blais, Hermus & Wilson	Devonian (Lochkovian)		Canada	An ischnacanthid ischnacanthiform. The type species is Euryacanthus rugosus.	
Tricuspicanthus	Gen. et 2 sp. nov	Valid	Blais, Hermus & Wilson	Devonian (Lochkovian)		Canada	An ischnacanthid ischnacanthiform. The type species is Tricuspicanthus gannitus; genus also contains Tricuspicanthus pisciculus.	

=== Cartilaginous fishes ===
Name	Novelty	Status	Authors	Age	Unit	Location	Notes	Images
Antarctilamna ultima	Sp. nov	Valid	Gess & Coates	Devonian (Famennian)	Witpoort Formation	South Africa	A species of Antarctilamna.	
Argoubia arnoldmülleri	Sp. nov	Valid	Leder	Oligocene		Germany	A mobuline eagle ray, a species of Argoubia.	
Arnomobula	Gen. et sp. nov	Valid	Leder	Oligocene		Germany	A mobuline eagle ray. The type species is Arnomobula eythrai.	
Callorhinchus alfordi	Sp. nov	Valid	Cicimurri & Ebersole	Paleocene (Thanetian)	Aquia Formation	United States	A plough-nose chimaera, a species of Callorhinchus.	
Callorhinchus phillipsi	Sp. nov	Valid	Cicimurri & Ebersole	Paleocene (Danian)	Clayton Formation	United States	A plough-nose chimaera, a species of Callorhinchus.	
Carcharhinus caquetius	Sp. nov	Valid	Carrillo-Briceño et al.	Miocene	Urumaco Formation	Venezuela	A requiem shark, a species of Carcharhinus.	
Carcharomodus	Gen. et comb. nov	Disputed	Kriwet, Mewis & Hempe	Miocene to Pliocene		Europe	A member of Lamnidae; a new genus for "Carcharodon" escheri Agassiz, 1843. De Schutter, van der Vliet & Bor (2021) did not consider it to be a genus distinct from Isurus.	
Cetorhinus piersoni	Sp. nov	Valid	Welton	Early Miocene	Astoria Formation	United States	A relative of the basking shark.	
Cooleyella duffini	Sp. nov	Valid	Ivanov in Ivanov, Nestell & Nestell	Permian (early Capitanian)	Bell Canyon Formation	United States	A member of Neoselachii belonging to the family Anachronistidae.	
Cretalamna catoxodon	Sp. nov	Valid	Siverson et al.	Late Cretaceous (middle Cenomanian)		Australia	An otodontid, a species of Cretalamna.	
Cretalamna deschutteri	Sp. nov	Valid	Siverson et al.	Late Cretaceous (early Turonian)		France	An otodontid, a species of Cretalamna.	
Cretalamna ewelli	Sp. nov	Valid	Siverson et al.	Late Cretaceous (late Coniacian)		United States	An otodontid, a species of Cretalamna.	
Cretalamna gertericorum	Sp. nov	Valid	Siverson et al.	Late Cretaceous (early Turonian)		France	An otodontid, a species of Cretalamna.	
Cretalamna hattini	Sp. nov	Valid	Siverson et al.	Late Cretaceous (early Campanian)		United States	An otodontid, a species of Cretalamna.	
Cretalamna sarcoportheta	Sp. nov	Valid	Siverson et al.	Late Cretaceous (early Campanian)		Sweden	An otodontid, a species of Cretalamna.	
Diademodus dominicus	Sp. nov	Valid	Roelofs et al.	Late Devonian	Virgin Hills Formation	Australia	A phoebodontid elasmobranch, a species of Diademodus.	
Edaphodon snowhillensis	Sp. nov	Valid	Gouiric-Cavalli et al.	Late Cretaceous (late Campanian)	Snow Hill Island Formation	Antarctica (James Ross Island)	A chimaera, a species of Edaphodon.	
Gogoselachus	Gen. et sp. nov	Valid	Long et al.	Devonian (early Frasnian)	Gogo Formation	Australia	A member of Chondrichthyes of uncertain phylogenetic placement. The type species is Gogoselachus lynbeazelyae.	
Keasius rhenanus	Sp. nov	Valid	Reinecke, von der Hocht & Dufraing	Miocene (late Burdigalian)	Lower Mica Finesand Formation	Germany	A relative of the basking shark, a species of Keasius.	
Keasius septemtrionalis	Sp. nov	Valid	Reinecke, von der Hocht & Dufraing	Oligocene (early / middle Chattian)	Sülstorf Beds	Germany	A relative of the basking shark, a species of Keasius.	
Kenolamna	Gen. et comb. nov	Valid	Siverson et al.	Late Cretaceous (middle Cenomanian)		Australia	An otodontid, a new genus for "Cretolamna" gunsoni Siverson (1996).	
Oligoraja	Gen. et sp. nov	Valid	Reinecke	Oligocene (Chattian)	Sülstorf Beds	Germany	A skate. The type species is Oligoraja pristina.	
Paraptychodus	Gen. et sp. nov	Valid	Hamm	Early Cretaceous (middle Albian)	Duck Creek Formation	United States	A member of Ptychodontidae. The type species is Paraptychodus washitaensis.	
Portalodus mannoliniae	Sp. nov	Valid	Potvin-Leduc et al.	Devonian (Givetian)	Plattekill Formation	United States	A member of Elasmobranchii, an omalodontid omalodontiform; a species of Portalodus.	
Pseudaetobatus belli	Sp. nov	Valid	Cicimurri & Ebersole	Early Eocene (Ypresian)	Hatchetigbee Formation; Tallahatta Formation	United States	An eagle ray, a species of Pseudaetobatus.	
Pseudaetobatus undulatus	Sp. nov	Valid	Cicimurri & Ebersole	Late Eocene (Priabonian)	Dry Branch Formation	United States	An eagle ray, a species of Pseudaetobatus.	
Pseudomegachasma	Nom. nov et comb. nov	Valid	Shimada et al.	Late Cretaceous (Cenomanian)	Greenhorn Limestone; Polpino Formation	Russia; United States	A putative planktivorous shark, possibly a sand shark; a replacement name for Eorhincodon Nessov (1999) (preoccupied). The type species is "Eorhincodon" casei Nessov (1999); genus also contains "Megachasma" comanchensis Shimada (2007).	
Raja thiedei	Sp. nov	Valid	Reinecke	Oligocene (Chattian)	Sülstorf Beds	Germany	A skate, a species of Raja.	
Scyliorhinus kannenbergi	Sp. nov	Valid	Leder	Oligocene		Germany	A catshark, a species of Scyliorhinus.	
Squaliomicrus	Gen. et sp. nov	Valid	Suzuki	Miocene	Iseyama Formation	Japan	A member of Dalatiidae. The type species is Squaliomicrus sanadaensis.	
Thrinacodus dziki	Sp. nov	Valid	Ginter et al.	Carboniferous (late Viséan)	Holy Cross Mountains Eyam Limestone	Poland United Kingdom	A phoebodontid elasmobranch, a species of Thrinacodus.	
Torpedo chattica	Sp. nov	Valid	Reinecke	Oligocene (Chattian)	Sülstorf Beds	Germany	A member of Torpedinidae, a species of Torpedo.	

=== Bony fishes ===
Name	Novelty	Status	Authors	Age	Unit	Location	Notes	Images
Acrorhinichthys	Gen. et sp. nov	Valid	Taverne & Capasso	Late Cretaceous (late Cenomanian)		Lebanon	A member of Pycnodontiformes. The type species is Acrorhinichthys poyatoi.	
Alosa paulicrenata	Sp. nov	Valid	Bratishko et al.	Miocene (early Serravallian)		Kazakhstan	A river herring.	
Altisolepis sinensis	Sp. nov	Valid	Sun et al.	Middle Triassic (Anisian)	Guanling Formation	China	A peltopleurid peltopleuriform, a species of Altisolepis.	
Aphia djafarovae	Sp. nov	Valid	Bratishko et al.	Miocene (early Serravallian)		Kazakhstan	A relative of the transparent goby.	
Apuliadercetis indeherbergei	Sp. nov	Valid	Taverne & Goolaerts	Late Cretaceous (Maastrichtian)	Gulpen Formation	Belgium	A dercetid aulopiform, a species of Apuliadercetis.	
Armigatus oligodentatus	Sp. nov	Valid	Vernygora & Murray	Late Cretaceous (Cenomanian-early Turonian)	Akrabou Formation	Morocco	A clupeomorph belonging to the group Ellimmichthyiformes; a species of Armigatus.	
Atacamaia	Gen. et sp. nov	Valid	Arratia & Schultze	Early Jurassic		Chile	An actinistian, probably a member of the group Coelacanthiformes and the family Whiteiidae. The type species is Atacamaia solitaria.	
Ballagadus	Gen. et 2 sp. nov	Valid	Smithson, Richards & Clack	Carboniferous (Tournaisian)	Ballagan Formation	United Kingdom	A lungfish. The type species is Ballagadus rossi; genus also includes Ballagadus caustrimi.	
Beiduyu	Gen. et sp. nov	Valid	Murray et al.	Late Jurassic	Suining Formation	China	A relative of gars. The type species is Beiduyu qijiangensis.	
Bolcaichthys	Gen. et comb. nov	Valid	Marramà & Carnevale	Eocene	Monte Bolca locality	Italy	A member of Clupeidae. A new genus for "Clupea" catopygoptera Woodward (1901).	
Canaryichthys	Gen. et sp. nov	Valid	Bartholomai	Early Cretaceous (late Albian)	Toolebuc Formation	Australia	A member of Halecomorphi, possibly a member of the group Ionoscopiformes. The type species is Canaryichthys rozefeldsi.	
Capassoichthys	Gen. et sp. nov	Valid	Taverne	Late Cretaceous (Campanian-Maastrichtian)		Italy	A member of Ichthyodectidae. The type species is Capassoichthys alfonsoi.	
Caprosimilis	Gen. et sp. nov	Valid	Bieńkowska-Wasiluk & Bonde	Oligocene (Rupelian)		Poland	A member of Acanthopterygii of uncertain phylogenetic placement, probably a relative of boarfishes. The type species is Caprosimilis carpathicus.	
Cathlorhynchus zengi	Sp. nov	Valid	Qiao & Zhu	Devonian (early Emsian)	Yukiang Formation	China	A dipnorhynchid lungfish, a species of Cathlorhynchus.	
Ceneichthys	Gen. et sp. nov	Valid	Taverne & Capasso	Late Triassic (late Norian)	Zorzino Formation	Italy	A member of Pholidophoridae. The type species is Ceneichthys zambellii.	
Centracanthus pobedinae	Sp. nov	Valid	Bratishko et al.	Miocene (early Serravallian)		Kazakhstan	A relative of the curled picarel.	
Cobitis nanningensis	Sp. nov	Valid	Chen, Liao & Lei	Oligocene	Yongning Formation	China	A member of Cobitidae, a species of Cobitis.	
Coccovedus	Gen. et sp. nov	Valid	Smithson, Richards & Clack	Carboniferous (Tournaisian)	Ballagan Formation	United Kingdom	A lungfish. The type species is Coccovedus celatus.	
Ctenodus roberti	Sp. nov	Valid	Smithson, Richards & Clack	Carboniferous (Tournaisian)	Ballagan Formation	United Kingdom	A lungfish, a species of Ctenodus.	
Ctenodus whitropei	Sp. nov	Valid	Smithson, Richards & Clack	Carboniferous (Tournaisian)	Ballagan Formation	United Kingdom	A lungfish, a species of Ctenodus.	
Ctenodus williei	Sp. nov	Valid	Smithson, Richards & Clack	Carboniferous (Tournaisian)	Ballagan Formation	United Kingdom	A lungfish, a species of Ctenodus.	
Cyclothone mukhachevae	Sp. nov	Valid	Nazarkin	Miocene	Kurasi Formation	Russia	A bristlemouth, a species of Cyclothone.	
Cyranichthys jagti	Sp. nov	Valid	Taverne & Goolaerts	Late Cretaceous (Maastrichtian)		Belgium; Netherlands	A dercetid aulopiform, a species of Cyranichthys.	
Diaphus prokofievi	Sp. nov	Valid	Taverne	Late Cretaceous (Santonian)		Italy	A species of Diaphus.	
Ducrotayichthys	Gen. et sp. nov	Valid	Taverne & Capasso	Late Cretaceous (late Cenomanian)		Lebanon	A member of Pycnodontiformes belonging to the family Gladiopycnodontidae. The type species is D. cornutus.	
Eleogobius	Gen. et comb. et sp. nov	Valid	Gierl & Reichenbacher	Miocene		Germany	A member of Gobiiformes. The type species is "Cottus" brevis Agassiz; genus also includes the new species Eleogobius gaudanti.	
Eoprocypris	Gen. et comb. nov	Valid	Chen, Chang & Liu	Late Eocene	Youganwo Formation	China	A member of Cyprinidae; a new genus for "Cyprinus" maomingensis Liu (1957).	
Eoscomber	Gen. et sp. nov	Valid	Claeson et al.	Early Eocene	Thies Formation	Senegal	A member of Scombridae. The type species is Eoscomber senegalicus.	
Equinoxiodus schultzei	Sp. nov	Valid	Sousa et al.	Late Cretaceous (early Cenomanian)	Alcântara Formation	Brazil	A lungfish, possibly member of Neoceratodontidae; a species of Equinoxiodus.	
Gardinerpiscis	Nom. nov	Valid	Romano & Kogan	Permian (Kungurian?)	Kempir Formation	Kazakhstan	A member of the family Karaunguriidae (a group of ray-finned fishes of uncertain phylogenetic placement); a replacement name for Gardineria Kazantseva-Selezneva (1981) (preoccupied).	
Genyonemus? karagiensis	Sp. nov	Valid	Bratishko et al.	Miocene (early Serravallian)		Kazakhstan	A member of the family Sciaenidae. Originally described as a possible species of Genyonemus, but subsequently made the type species of a separate genus Leptosciaena by Bannikov, Schwarzhans & Carnevale (2018).	
"Gobiida" bicornuta	Sp. nov	Valid	Lin, Girone & Wolf	Miocene (Tortonian)	Sant'Agata Fossili Formation	Italy	A goby. Assigned to the genus Hoeseichthys by Schwarzhans, Agiadi & Carnevale (2020).	
"Gobiida" brioche	Sp. nov	Valid	Lin, Girone & Wolf	Miocene (Tortonian) and Pliocene	Sant'Agata Fossili Formation	Italy; Morocco	A goby. Assigned to the genus Hoeseichthys by Schwarzhans, Agiadi & Carnevale (2020).	
Hayolperichthys	Gen. et sp. nov	Valid	Taverne & Capasso	Late Cretaceous (late Cenomanian)		Lebanon	A member of Pycnodontiformes belonging to the family Gladiopycnodontidae. The type species is H. pectospinus.	
Hyrcanogobius hesperis	Sp. nov	Valid	Schwarzhans, Bradić & Rundić	Miocene (late Serravallian)		Serbia	A goby. Originally described as a species of Hyrcanogobius; Schwarzhans et al. (2017) transferred it to the genus Hesperichthys.	
Isadia arefievi	Sp. nov	Valid	Minikh, Arefiev & Golubev	Late Permian	Salarevo Formation	Russia	A ray-finned fish belonging to the group Chondrostei and the order Eurynotoidiformes; a species of Isadia.	
Jonoichthys	Gen. et sp. nov	Valid	Gouiric-Cavalli	Late Jurassic	Vaca Muerta Formation	Argentina	A member of Aspidorhynchiformes. The type species is Jonoichthys challwa.	
Kenyaichthys	Gen. et sp. nov	Valid	Altner & Reichenbacher	Late Miocene	Lukeino Formation	Kenya	An aplocheiloid cyprinodontiform. The type species is Kenyaichthys kipkechi.	
Labrobolcus	Gen. et sp. nov	Valid	Bannikov & Bellwood	Eocene (Ypresian)	Monte Bolca locality	Italy	A wrasse. The type species is Labrobolcus giorgioi.	
Leithaodon	Gen. et sp. nov	Valid	Carnevale & Tyler	Middle Miocene		Austria	A member of Tetraodontidae. The type species is Leithaodon sandroi.	
Malingichthys	Gen. et 2 sp. nov	Valid	Tintori et al.	Middle Triassic (late Ladinian)	Falang Formation	China	A relative of Pholidophorus. The type species is Malingichthys nimaiguensis; genus also includes Malingichthys wanfenglinensis.	
Morone? bannikovi	Sp. nov	Valid	Bratishko et al.	Miocene (early Serravallian)		Kazakhstan	A temperate bass, probably a species of Morone.	
Moythomasia lineata	Sp. nov	Valid	Choo	Late Devonian		Germany	An early ray-finned fish, a species of Moythomasia.	
Neogobius udovichenkoi	Sp. nov	Valid	Bratishko et al.	Miocene (early Serravallian)		Kazakhstan	A goby, a species of Neogobius.	
Nickcaves	Gen. et sp. nov	Valid	Carnevale & Bannikov	Eocene (Ypresian)	Monte Bolca locality	Italy	A member of Percomorphacea related to Pietschellus aenigmaticus. The type species is Nickcaves pterygocephalus.	
Ningxiaplatysomus	Gen. et sp. nov	Valid	Tan, Wang & Lu	Carboniferous (Namurian)	Tupo Formation	China	A ray-finned fish related to Platysomus. The type species is Ningxiaplatysomus parvus.	
Occludus	Gen. et comb. nov	Valid	Smithson, Richards & Clack	Carboniferous (Tournaisian)	Ballagan Formation	United Kingdom	A lungfish. The type species is "Ctenodus" romeri Thomson (1965).	
Ombilinichthys	Gen. et sp. nov	Valid	Murray et al.	Age uncertain, probably Eocene	Sangkarewang Formation	Indonesia	A gourami. The type species is Ombilinichthys yamini.	
Ophiopsiella	Gen. et comb. nov	Valid	Lane & Ebert	Middle Triassic to Late Jurassic	Stanleyville Formation, Songa Limestones	Democratic Republic of the Congo; France; Germany; Italy; Spain; United Kingdom	A ionoscopiform halecomorph (a relative of the bowfin); a new genus for the majority of species traditionally assigned to the genus Ophiopsis. The type species is "Ophiopsis" procerus Agassiz (1843); genus also contains "Ophiopsis" attenuata Wagner (1863), "Ophiopsis" penicillata Agassiz (1843), "Ophiopsis" breviceps Egerton (1852), "Ophiopsis" dorsalis Agassiz (1843), "Ophiopsis" montsechensis Wenz (1968) and "Ophiopsis" lepturus Bellotti (1857).	
Panxianichthys	Gen. et sp. nov	Valid	Xu & Chen	Middle Triassic (Anisian)	Guanling Formation	China	A non-parasemionotiform halecomorph (a relative of the bowfin). Originally described as a member of Ionoscopiformes; Zuoyu et al. (2017) transferred it to the separate order Panxianichthyiformes. The type species is Panxianichthys imparilis.	
Paphosiscus	Gen. et 2 sp. nov	Valid	Grogan & Lund	Carboniferous (Serpukhovian)	Heath Formation	United States	A ray-finned fish. Genus contains Paphosiscus circulocaudus and Paphosiscus scalmocristus.	
Parablennius prokofievi	Sp. nov	Valid	Bratishko et al.	Miocene (early Serravallian)		Kazakhstan	A combtooth blenny, a species of Parablennius.	
Paralebias conquensis	Sp. nov	Valid	Gaudant et al.	Miocene		Spain	A member of Poeciliidae, a species of Paralebias.	
Paranursallia	Gen. et sp. et comb. nov	Valid	Taverne et al.	Late Cretaceous (Cenomanian)		Morocco; Tunisia	A member of Pycnodontidae. The type species is Paranursallia spinosa; genus also contains "Nursallia" gutturosa Arambourg (1954).	
Pastorius	Gen. et sp. nov	Valid	Carnevale & Johnson	Late Cretaceous (Campanian-Maastrichtian)	Liburnica Formation	Italy	A member of Ophidiiformes. The type species is Pastorius methenyi.	
Permoceratodus	Gen. et sp. nov	Valid	Krupina in Lebedev et al.	Late Permian (Vyatkian)		Russia	A lungfish related to the Queensland lungfish. The type species is Permoceratodus gentilis.	
Pharisatichthys	Gen. et sp. nov	Valid	Gaudant & Carnevale	Late Oligocene		France	A mojarra. The type species is Pharisatichthys aquensis.	
Pomatoschistus bunyatovi	Sp. nov	Valid	Bratishko et al.	Miocene		Czech Republic; Italy; Kazakhstan; Serbia	Originally described as a species of Pomatoschistus, but subsequently transferred to the gobionelline genus Hellenigobius.	
Ponticola zosimovichi	Sp. nov	Valid	Bratishko et al.	Miocene (early Serravallian)		Kazakhstan	A goby, a species of Ponticola.	
Proterorhinus vasilievae	Sp. nov	Valid	Schwarzhans, Bradić & Rundić	Miocene (early Serravallian)		Serbia	A tubenose goby.	
Pseudovinctifer	Gen. et sp. nov	Valid	Arratia	Early Cretaceous		Chile	A member of Aspidorhynchidae. The type species is Pseudovinctifer chilensis.	
Pshekharus	Gen. et sp. nov	Valid	Bannikov & Kotlyar	Miocene		Russia	A member of Sparidae. The type species is Pshekharus yesinorum.	
Ptychoceratodus roemeri	Sp. nov	Valid	Skrzycki	Late Triassic (Carnian)		Poland	A lungfish, a species of Ptychoceratodus.	
Raynerius	Gen. et sp. nov	Valid	Giles et al.	Devonian (Frasnian)	Ferques Formation	France	An early ray-finned fish. The type species is Raynerius splendens.	
Sander svetovidovi	Sp. nov	Valid	Kovalchuk	Late Miocene		Ukraine	A member of Percidae, a species of Sander.	
Sardina tarletskovi	Sp. nov	Valid	Baykina	Miocene (Konkian-Sarmatian boundary)		Russia	A relative of the European pilchard.	
Saurichthys breviabdominalis	Sp. nov	Valid	Maxwell et al.	Middle Triassic (Ladinian)	Besano Formation	Switzerland	A saurichthyiform, a species of Saurichthys.	
Saurichthys rieppeli	Sp. nov	Valid	Maxwell et al.	Middle Triassic (Ladinian)	Besano Formation	Switzerland	A saurichthyiform, a species of Saurichthys.	
Saurichthys yangjuanensis	Sp. nov	Valid	Wu et al.	Middle Triassic (Anisian)	Guanling Formation	China	A saurichthyiform, a species of Saurichthys.	
Scutatoclupea	Gen. et sp. et comb. nov	Valid	Bannikov	Late Cretaceous (Cenomanian)		Lebanon; Mexico	A member of Clupeomorpha belonging to the group Ellimmichthyiformes and the family Paraclupeidae. The type species is Scutatoclupea bacchiai; genus also includes "Triplomystus" applegatei Alvarado-Ortega & Ovalles-Damián (2008).	
Serenichthys	Gen. et sp. nov	Valid	Gess & Coates	Devonian (Famennian)		South Africa	A coelacanth. The type species is Serenichthys kowiensis.	
Silurus joergi	Sp. nov	Valid	Gaudant	Late Miocene		Germany	A catfish belonging to the family Siluridae, a species of Silurus.	
Sinamia lanzhouensis	Sp. nov	Valid	Peng et al.	Early Cretaceous		China	A sinamiid amiiform (a relative of the bowfin), a species of Sinamia.	
Symphodus westneati	Sp. nov	Valid	Carnevale	Miocene	Eisenstadt-Sopron Basin	Austria	A wrasse, a species of Symphodus.	
Tchunglinius	Gen. et sp. nov	Valid	Wang & Wu	Oligocene	Nima Basin	China	A member of Cyprinidae. The type species is Tchunglinius tchangii.	
Trewasciaena suzini	Sp. nov	Valid	Bratishko et al.	Miocene (early Serravallian)		Kazakhstan	A member of Sciaenidae, a species of Trewasciaena.	
Tricerichthys	Gen. et sp. nov	Valid	Taverne & Capasso	Late Cretaceous (late Cenomanian)		Lebanon	A member of Pycnodontiformes belonging to the family Gladiopycnodontidae. The type species is T. wenzi.	
Trollichthys	Gen. et sp. nov	Valid	Marramà & Carnevale	Early Eocene (late Ypresian)		Italy	A round herring. The type species is Trollichthys bolcensis.	
Ursichthys	Gen. et sp. nov	Valid	Newbrey & Konishi	Late Cretaceous (late Campanian)	Bearpaw Formation	Canada	A member of Aulopiformes. The type species is Ursichthys longiparietalis.	
Valencia arcasensis	Sp. nov	Valid	Gaudant et al.	Miocene		Spain	A species of Valencia.	
Wainwrightilabrus	Gen. et comb. nov	Valid	Carnevale	Miocene	Eisenstadt-Sopron Basin	Austria	A wrasse. The type species is Wainwrightilabrus agassizi (Münster 1846).	
Waldmanichthys	Gen. et comb. nov		Sferco, López-Arbarello & Báez	Early Cretaceous	Koonwarra Beds	Australia	A teleost related to Luisiella feruglioi and Cavenderichthys talbragarensis; a new genus for "Leptolepis" koonwarri Waldman (1971).	
Wushaichthys	Gen. et sp. nov	Valid	Xu, Zhao & Shen	Middle Triassic	Falang Formation	China	A member of Thoracopteridae. The type species is Wushaichthys exquisitus.	
Xylognathus	Gen. et sp. nov	Valid	Smithson, Richards & Clack	Carboniferous (Tournaisian)	Ballagan Formation	United Kingdom	A lungfish. The type species is Xylognathus macrustenus.	

== Other fishes ==
Name	Novelty	Status	Authors	Age	Unit	Location	Notes	Images
Canyonlepis	Gen. et sp. nov	Valid	Andreev et al.	Ordovician (Sandbian)		United States	A possible cartilaginous fish. The type species is Canyonlepis smithae.	
Janusiscus	Gen. et sp. nov	Valid	Giles, Friedman & Brazeau	Early Devonian (middle Lochkovian)	Kureika Formation	Russia	A gnathostome related to the last common ancestor of cartilaginous fishes and bony fishes. The type species is Janusiscus schultzei.	
Tezakia	Gen. et sp. nov	Valid	Andreev et al.	Ordovician (Sandbian)		United States	A possible cartilaginous fish, a relative of Altholepis. The type species is Tezakia hardingensis.	
