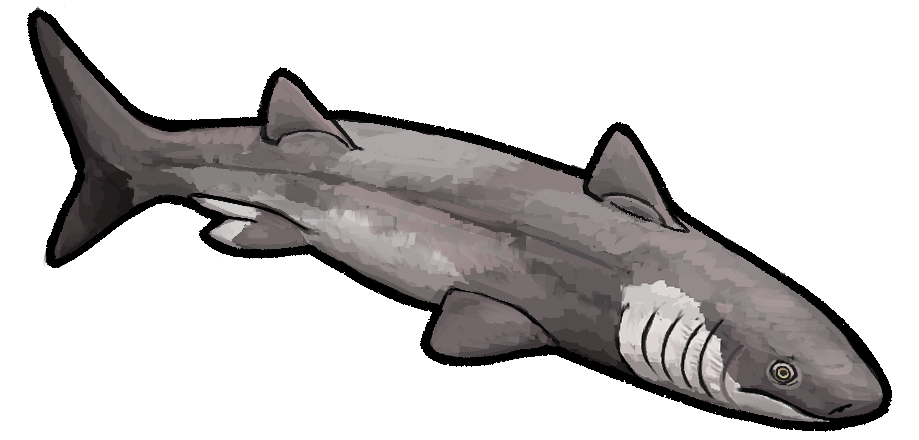
- Life restoration of Diademodus hydei

Scientific classification
- Kingdom: Animalia
- Phylum: Chordata
- Class: Chondrichthyes
- Subclass: Elasmobranchii
- Order: †Phoebodontiformes
- Family: †Phoebodontidae
- Genus: †Diademodus; Harris, 1951

Type species
- †Diademodus hydei Harris, 1951

Species
- †D. hydei (Harris, 1951); †D. utahensis (Ginter, 2008); †D. dominicus (Roelofs et al., 2015)

= Diademodus =

Diademodus Temporal range: Late Devonian (Pragian to Emsian), ~377–360 Ma

Extinct genus of cartilaginous fish

Diademodus is an extinct genus of phoebodontid elasmobranch that lived during the Late Devonian Period. The genus was first described by paleontologist John E. Harris on the basis of a body fossil from the Cleveland Shale formation of Ohio. Teeth attributable to this genus have also been reported from Utah, Nevada, Western Australia, and Russia.

== Description ==
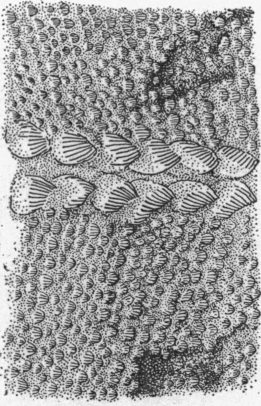
The denticles along the lateral line of D. hydei have been described as being similar in form to those of Ctenacanthus concinnus (pictured)

According to Harris, Diademodus was a long, slender cartilaginous fish that reached a body length of up to 40 cm (1.3 ft). He stated that the body may have been slightly wider than it was tall, making it comparable in overall form to the modern catshark genus Scyliorhinus. Like most cartilaginous fishes, its body was covered in tooth-like dermal denticles. These denticles were shorter near the head and larger in rows along the lateral line. The tail lacked an exaggerated keel such as that seen in the contemporaneous genus Cladoselache.

=== Fins ===
Diademodus possessed unusual fin morphology compared with other known chondrichthyans. Its pectoral fins were positioned unusually far back along the body, approximately 14 cm (5.5 in) from the tip of the head. They were also extremely small, extending only 5.2 cm (2.0 in) along the body and projecting about 2.5 cm (0.98 in) outward. The dorsal fin was located far forward, about 2 cm (0.79 in) ahead of the pectoral fin's front edge. The pelvic fins were described by Harris as being "normal in size" relative to the pectoral fins and were approximately 2.9 cm (1.1 in) in length. The caudal fin was heterocercal, with the upper lobe longer than the lower lobe. There is no evidence for fin spines, an anal fin, or a second dorsal fin in the only described body fossil of the genus, although it is inferred a second dorsal fin was present. Males possessed well-developed pelvic claspers.

=== Teeth ===
The teeth of Diademodus were very small, measuring approximately 1 mm (0.039 in) in basal width. Individual teeth bore between nine and seventeen cusps in total, depending on the species. The innermost and outermost cusps were the longest and had at least three smaller cusps positioned between them. Some teeth also exhibited additional, tiny cusps between the primary cusps of the dentition, indicating that Diademodus may have exhibited heterodont dentition.

== Classification ==
Diademodus was originally classified within the family Coronodontidae, a group that included only the genera Coronodus and Diademodus. This classification was disputed in 2010, and Diademodus was tentatively reassigned to the family Phoebodontidae within the order Phoebodontiformes, potentially placing it alongside Phoebodus and Thrinacodus. Phoebodonts are generally interpreted as early members of the subclass Elasmobranchii, which also includes modern sharks and rays.

== Paleobiology ==
The small fins, heterocercal tail, and elongated body of Diademodus suggest that it was most likely a bottom-dwelling fish. When the genus was first described, Harris proposed that its small teeth indicated a scavenging lifestyle. He also suggested that D. hydei was piscivorous, as bony fish scales belonging to palaeoniscoids are preserved in the stomach region of the fossil. In the 2008 description of D. utahensis, paleontologist Michał Ginter suggested that the teeth of this species may have been weakly attached to the jaws, potentially limiting the animal's ability to capture large prey. Based on this interpretation, he proposed that Diademodus may have been a filter feeder, using its multicusped teeth as a sieve to trap small organisms while seawater was expelled through the mouth.
