= Arnomobula =

Arnomobula eythrai Temporal range: Oligocene

Scientific classification
- Kingdom: Animalia
- Phylum: Chordata
- Class: Chondrichthyes
- Subclass: Elasmobranchii
- Order: Myliobatiformes
- Family: Myliobatidae
- Genus: †Arnomobula; Leder, 2015
- Species: †A. eythrai

Binomial name
- †Arnomobula eythrai Leder, 2015

Extinct Devil Ray Genus

Arnomobula is an extinct genus of devil ray from the Oligocene epoch. It contains a single species, A. eythrai, described from the middle Oligocene Böhlen Formation of Germany. It is currently only known from isolated teeth. The genus is named for Dr. Arnold Müller, curator of the geological and paleontological Collections of the University of Leipzig. The specific epithet is a reference to the former village of Eythra, a town which gave way to the Zwenkau lignite mine which produces this species.
