= Pauropetalichthys =

Pauropetalichthys Temporal range: Emsian

Scientific classification
- Kingdom: Animalia
- Phylum: Chordata
- Class: †Placodermi
- Order: †Petalichthyida
- Family: †Quasipetalichthyidae
- Genus: †Pauropetalichthys
- Species: †P. magnoculus

Binomial name
- †Pauropetalichthys magnoculus Pan et al., 2015

Extinct genus of fishes

Pauropetalichthys is an extinct genus of quasipetalichthyid that lived during the Emsian stage of the Early Devonian epoch.

== Distribution ==
Pauropetalichthys magnoculus fossils are known from Yunnan, China.
