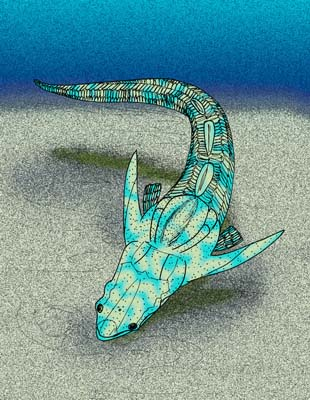

Scientific classification
- Kingdom: Animalia
- Phylum: Chordata
- Class: †Placodermi
- Order: †Petalichthyida
- Genus: †Neopetalichthys; Liu, 1973
- Species: †N. yenmenpaensis

Binomial name
- †Neopetalichthys yenmenpaensis Liu, 1973

= Neopetalichthys =

Neopetalichthys Temporal range: Emsian

Extinct genus of fishes

Neopetalichthys yenmenpaensis is an extinct petalichthid placoderm from the Early Devonian of China.

== Fossils ==
The holotype and only known specimen is a poorly preserved partial, and elongated skull from Emsian-aged strata in Sichuan. The skull may be around 8.5 cm (3.3 in) in length.

== Phylogeny ==
Denison 1978 questions Neopetalichthys' placement within Petalichthyida, regarding it as Placodermi incertae sedis, though he does acknowledge that the skull has anatomical features in common with petalichthyids.). According to Zhu's 1991 redescription of Diandongpetalichthys, Neopetalichthys' status as a petalichthyid is confirmed, though, in that study, it is regarded as a basal incertae sedis.

Quasipetalichthys is possibly closely related to Neopetalichthys, and may or may not be placed together within Quasipetalichthyidae.
