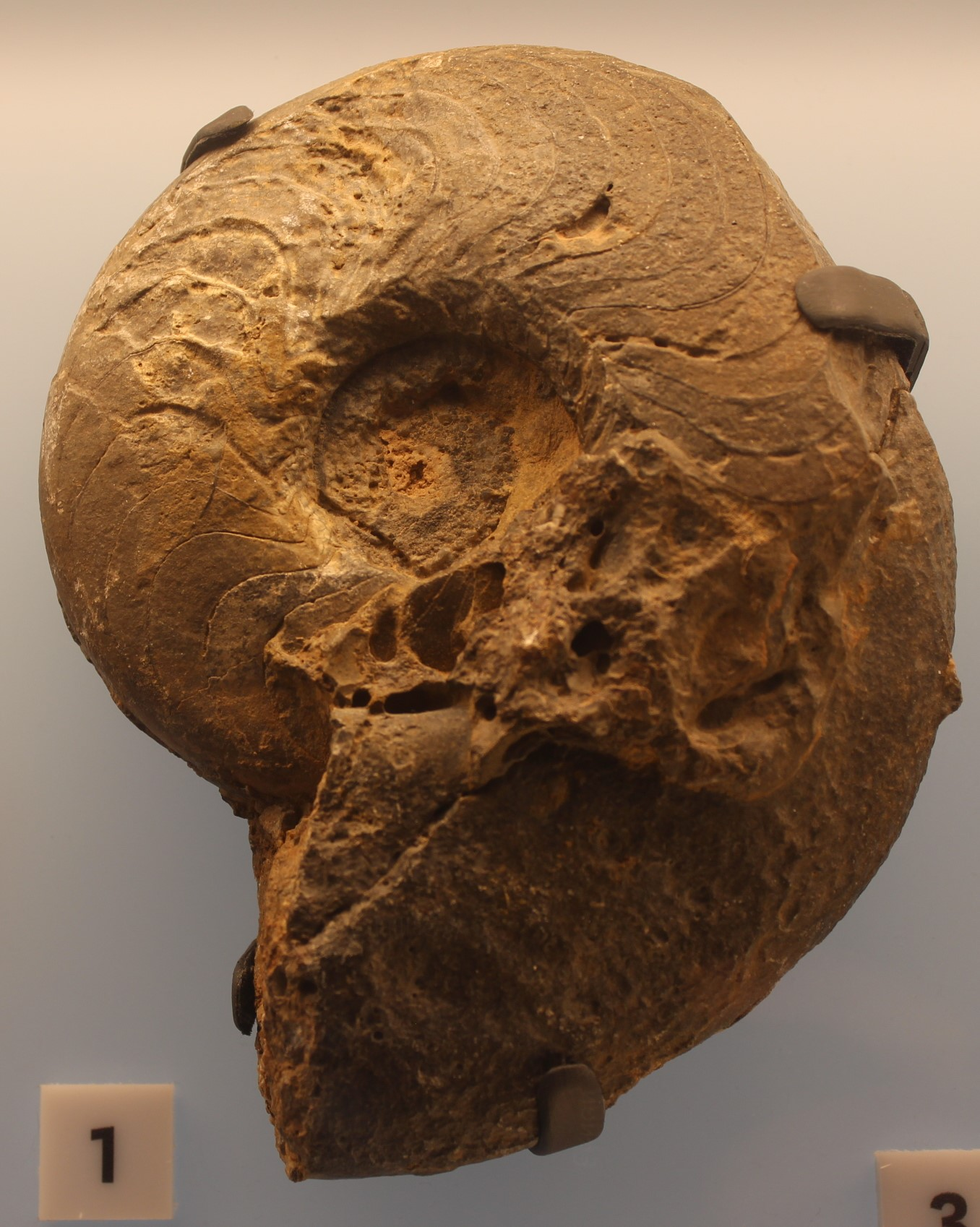
- Manticoceras evolutum fossil, National Museum of Natural History

Scientific classification
- Kingdom: Animalia
- Phylum: Mollusca
- Class: Cephalopoda
- Subclass: Ammonoidea
- Order: Agoniatitida
- Family: Gephuroceratidae
- Genus: Manticoceras Hyatt 1884

= Manticoceras =

Manticoceras Temporal range: Frasnian to Famennian 382.21–368.5 Ma

Extinct genus of molluscs

Manticoceras is a genus of agoniatitid ammonoids included in the family Gephuroceratidae. These fast-moving nektonic carnivores lived in the Devonian period, from 382.4 to 376.1 Ma.

== Species ==
- Manticoceras adorfense
- Manticoceras contractum
- Manticoceras drevermanni
- Manticoceras intumescens
- Manticoceras lamed
- Manticoceras nodifer
- Manticoceras simulator
- Manticoceras sinuosum

== Distribution ==
Fossils of species within this genus have been found in the sediments of Germany, Australia, Canada, France, Poland, Spain, the United Kingdom and United States.
