= Kichkassia =

Kichkassia Temporal range: Middle Permian (Wordian)

Scientific classification
- Kingdom: Animalia
- Phylum: Chordata
- Class: Actinopterygii
- Order: †Eurynotoidiformes
- Family: †Eurynotoidiidae
- Genus: †Kichkassia; Minikh, 1990
- Species: †K. furcae

Binomial name
- †Kichkassia furcae Minikh, 1990

Synonyms
- Amblypterina Berg, 1940; Amblypterina costata (Eichwald, 1860)

Extinct genus of prehistoric freshwater ray-finned fish

Kichkassia is an extinct genus of prehistoric freshwater ray-finned fish from the order Eurynotoidiformes. It contains only a single species, K. furcae, known from the Middle Permian (Wordian) of European Russia. The former genus Amblypterina and its type species A. costata are considered a junior synonym of it, although some of its species have also been transferred to Isadia.

It had relatively narrow, unspecialized teeth, and may have thus been omnivorous in life, with a primary diet of soft-carapaced invertebrates.
