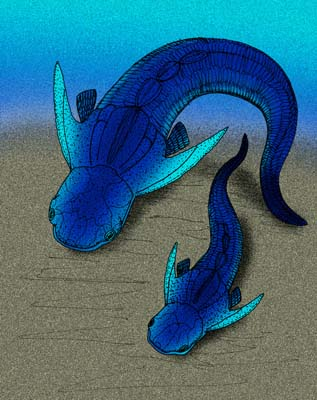

Scientific classification
- Kingdom: Animalia
- Phylum: Chordata
- Class: †Placodermi
- Order: †Petalichthyida
- Family: †Quasipetalichthyidae
- Genus: †Quasipetalichthys; Liu, 1973
- Species: †Q. haikouensis

Binomial name
- †Quasipetalichthys haikouensis Liu, 1973

= Quasipetalichthys =

Quasipetalichthys Temporal range: Middle Devonian: Givetian Stage

Extinct genus of fishes

Quasipetalichthys haikouensis is the type and only known species of the extinct petalichthid placoderm, Quasipetalichthys. Fossil remains of Quasipetalichthys have been found in the Middle Devonian, Givetian faunal stage of China.

== Fossils ==
Quasipetalichthys is known primarily from two poorly preserved skulls from the Givetian-aged Haikou Formation of Haikou, Kunming, China, where they were found in association with remains of antiarch placoderms such as Bothriolepis sinensis, and Hunanolepis. The larger of the two skulls may have been around 10 cm (3.9 in) in length.

== Phylogeny ==
Quasipetalichthys haikouensis is considered a basal petalichthyid (though in 1978 Denison referred to it as being "aberrant"). In Zhu's 1991 redescription of Diandongpetalichthys, Quasipetalichthys was placed within a different family: the Quasipetalichthyidae, and was regarded as the sister group of the more advanced Macropetalichthyidae, with Diandongpetalichthys serving as the primitive sister group of these two taxa.

Neopetalichthys may be very closely related to Quasipetalichthys, and may or may not be placed together within Quasipetalichthyidae in a more completed phylogeny. Whether or not Neopetalichthys is included in the family, Eurycaraspis is placed in Quasipetalichthyidae as a sister taxon toQuasipetalichthys.

== Distribution and habitat ==
The Haikou Formation, the only known set of rocks that has produced fossils of Quasipetalichthys, appears at the Earth's surface in south-central China. Other paleontological investigations into these sediments have produced spores and macrofossils from Devonian plants such as the Lycopods (classified as Lycopodophyta or Lycopsida)). These plant remains often occur alongside those of Placoderms such as Bothriolepis which implies a very near-shore or freshwater environment for this geologic formation.
