= Tezakia =

Tezakia Temporal range: Sandbian

Scientific classification
- Kingdom: Animalia
- Phylum: Chordata
- Class: Chondrichthyes
- Order: †Altholepidiformes
- Family: †Tezakidae
- Genus: †Tezakia
- Species: †T. hardingensis

Binomial name
- †Tezakia hardingensis Andreev et al., 2015

Extinct genus of tezakid

Tezakia is an extinct genus of tezakid that lived during the Sandbian stage of the Late Ordovician epoch.

== Distribution ==
Tezakia hardingensis is known from the Harding Sandstone of Colorado.
