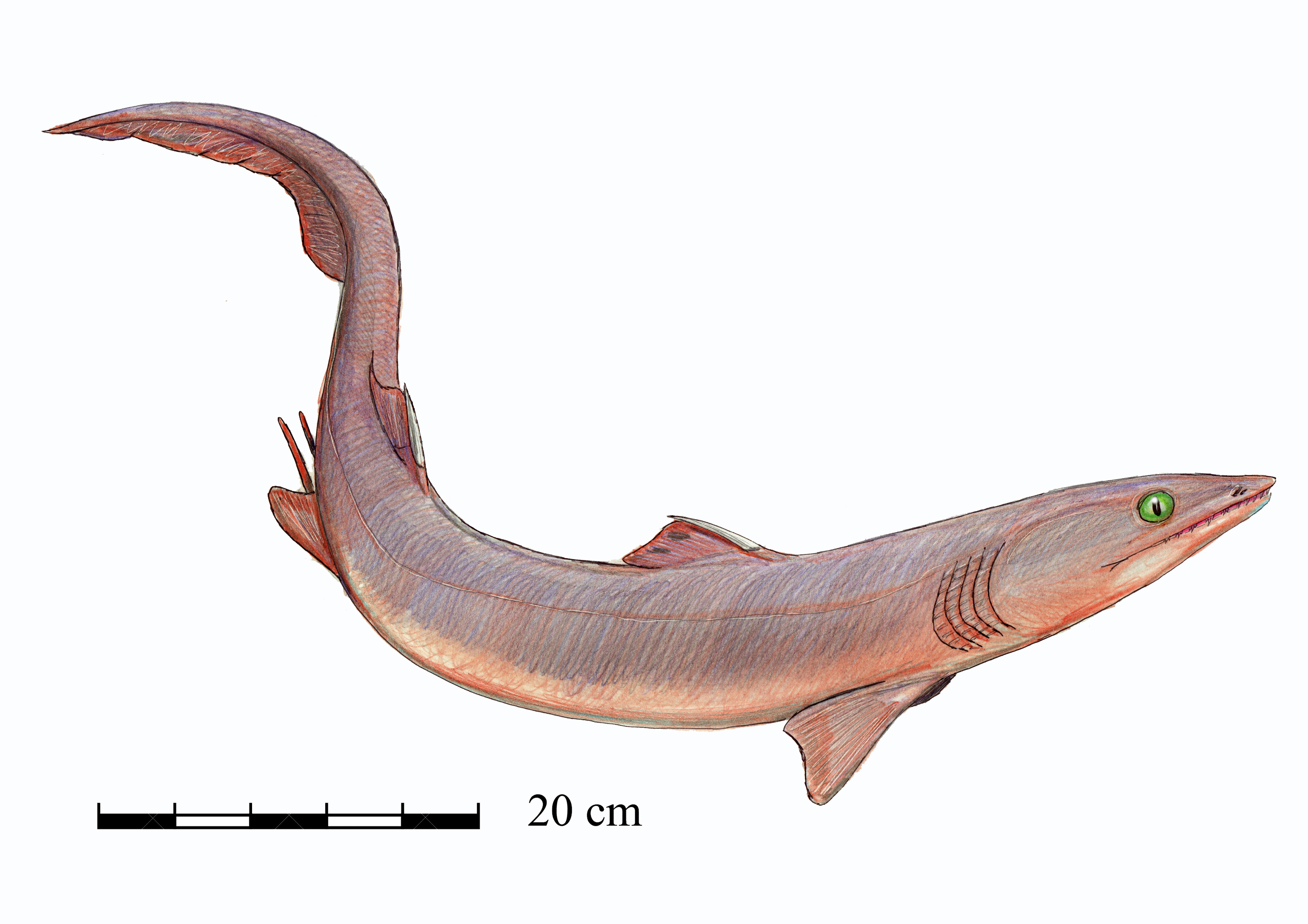
- Phoebodus
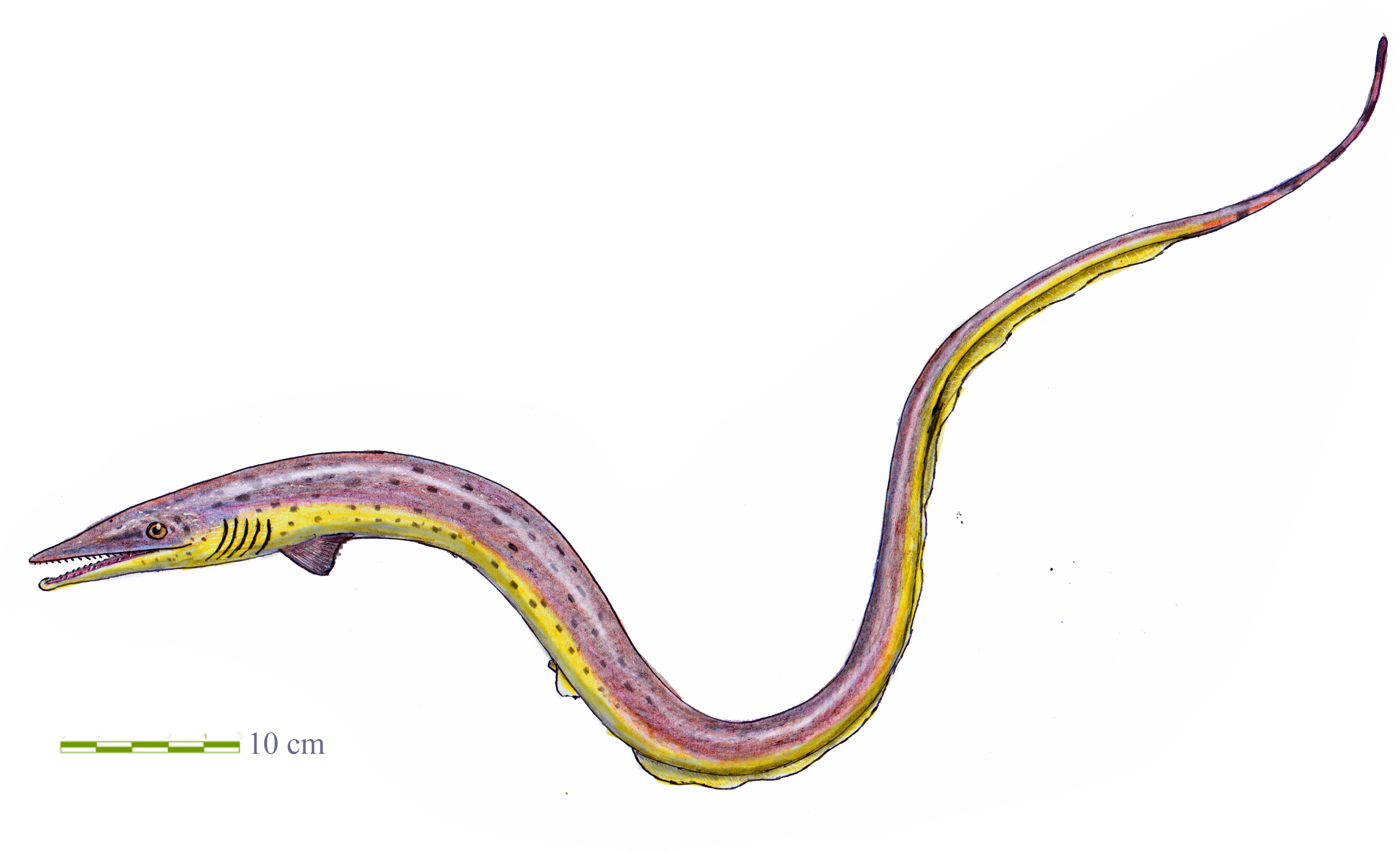
- Thrinacodus

Scientific classification
- Kingdom: Animalia
- Phylum: Chordata
- Class: Chondrichthyes
- Subclass: Elasmobranchii
- Order: †Phoebodontiformes; Ginter et al. 2002
- Family: †Phoebodontidae; Williams in Zangerl, 1985

Genera
- Phoebodus; Diademodus; Thrinacodus

= Phoebodontiformes =

Phoebodontiformes Temporal range: Middle Devonian–Early Carboniferous

Extinct group of elasmobranchs

Phoebodontiformes is an extinct group of elasmobranchs (sensu lato), known from the Devonian and Carboniferous periods. It includes the genera Phoebodus, Diademodus and Thrinacodus. Phoebodus and Thrinacodus have slender, elongate bodies. Their teeth are tricuspate (bearing three cusps). Some studies have recovered the group as paraphyletic.

Jalodus and other members of the family Jalodontidae, which range from the Devonian to the Triassic, were formerly included in this order, but have subsequently been assigned to their own order, the Jalodontiformes.
