= Eythra =

Former settlement in Germany

Coordinates: 51°14′N 12°18′E

Eythra is a former settlement near Leipzig, Germany. It is archaeologically important because it is one of the sites of Europe's oldest civilisation. Investigations between 1993 and 2005 under the direction of Harald Stäuble revealed a village complex and temple of 25 hectares (62 acres) at Eythra which had been home to up to 300 people. The village Eythra was demolished in the 1980s to make way for an open pit lignite mine. Its territory is now part of the municipalities of Leipzig and Zwenkau.
