= Aphia djafarovae =

Aphia djafarovae Temporal range: Serravallian

Scientific classification
- Kingdom: Animalia
- Phylum: Chordata
- Class: Actinopterygii
- Division: Teleostei
- Order: Gobiiformes
- Family: Gobiidae
- Genus: Aphia
- Species: †A. djafarovae

Binomial name
- †Aphia djafarovae Bratishko et al., 2015

Species of fish (fossil)

Aphia djafarovae is an extinct species of Aphia that lived during the Serravallian stage of the Miocene epoch.

== Distribution ==
Otolith fossils of A. djafarovae are known from the Mangyshlak Peninsula of western Kazakhstan.
