= Ctenodus =

Ctenodus Temporal range: Tournaisian–Moscovian

Scientific classification
- Domain: Eukaryota
- Kingdom: Animalia
- Phylum: Chordata
- Clade: Sarcopterygii
- Class: Dipnoi
- Family: †Ctenodontidae
- Genus: †Ctenodus; Agassiz, 1838

Extinct genus of fishes

Ctenodus (from Greek: κτείς kteis, 'comb' and Greek: ὀδούς odoús 'tooth') is an extinct genus of prehistoric lungfish and the longest-surviving genus of Carboniferous lungfish.
