= Lauren Sallan =

American paleobiologist

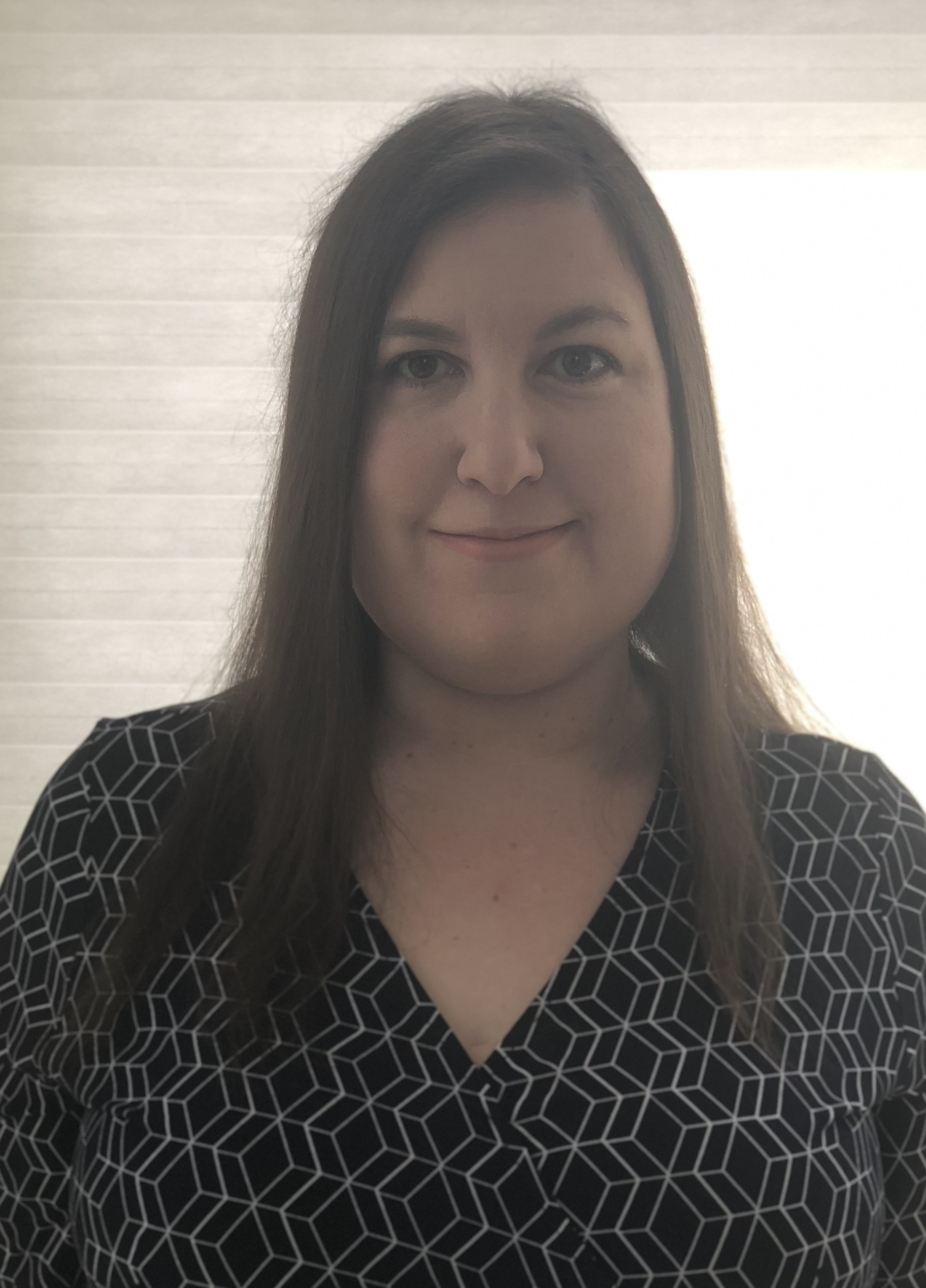
- Sallan in 2022
- Born: Lauren Cole; Chicago, Illinois, U.S.
- Education: Florida Atlantic University (BS, MS); University of Chicago (MS, PhD)
- Known for: Paleobiology; Ichthyology; Macroevolution
- Scientific career
- Workplaces: University of Michigan; University of Pennsylvania; Okinawa Institute of Science and Technology
- Doctoral advisor: Michael Coates

Lauren Sallan is an American academic who is the head of the Macroevolution Unit at the Okinawa Institute of Science and Technology and was previously the Martin Meyerson Assistant Professor in Interdisciplinary Studies at the University of Pennsylvania. She is a paleobiologist who uses big data analytics to study macroevolution. She is a TED Senior Fellow and has two TED talks with almost three million views as of 2022.

== Early life and education ==
Sallan was born in Chicago. She studied biology at Florida Atlantic University and graduated with a Bachelor of Science, cum laude, in 2003, and a Master of Science in biology in 2007 She then earned a Master of Science in organismal biology and a PhD in integrative biology from the University of Chicago.

== Career ==
=== Research ===
Sallan worked on End-Devonian extinction; a critical stage in the evolution of vertebrates. She found that the Hangenberg event was immensely important for modern biodiversity and a bottleneck in the evolutionary history of vertebrates. During her PhD, she studied the fossils of fish that diversified around the time of an extinction event, finding the head features diversified before body shapes. The work was covered in The New York Times, The Washington Post and Motherboard. After completing her PhD, Sallan joined the Michigan Society of Fellows at the University of Michigan She studied the early evolution of ray-finned fishes, including an early form with a tetrapod-like spine.

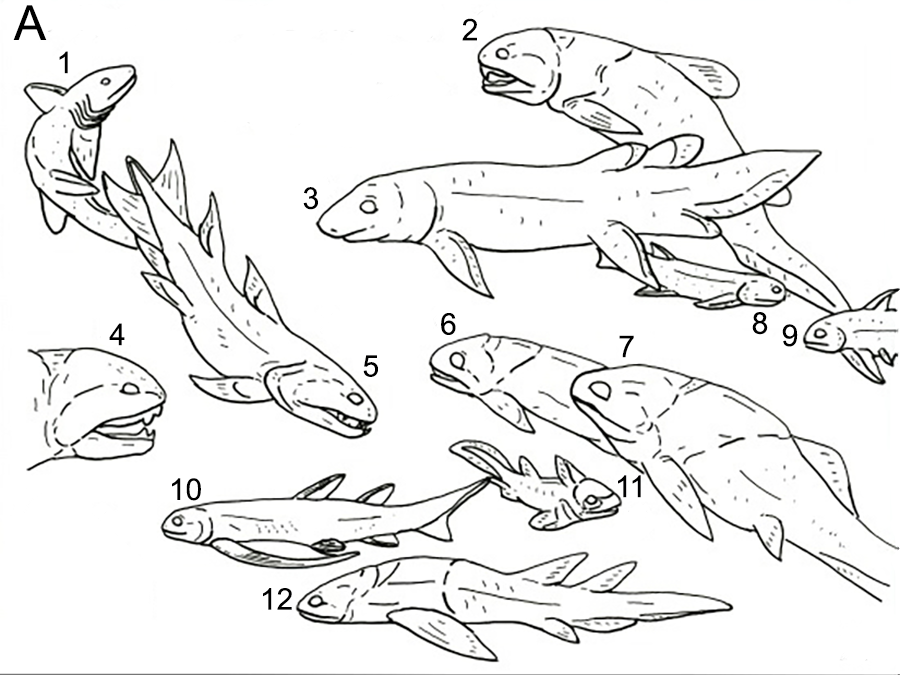
The Devonian fishes of Michigan - from her 2018 paper with Jack Stack

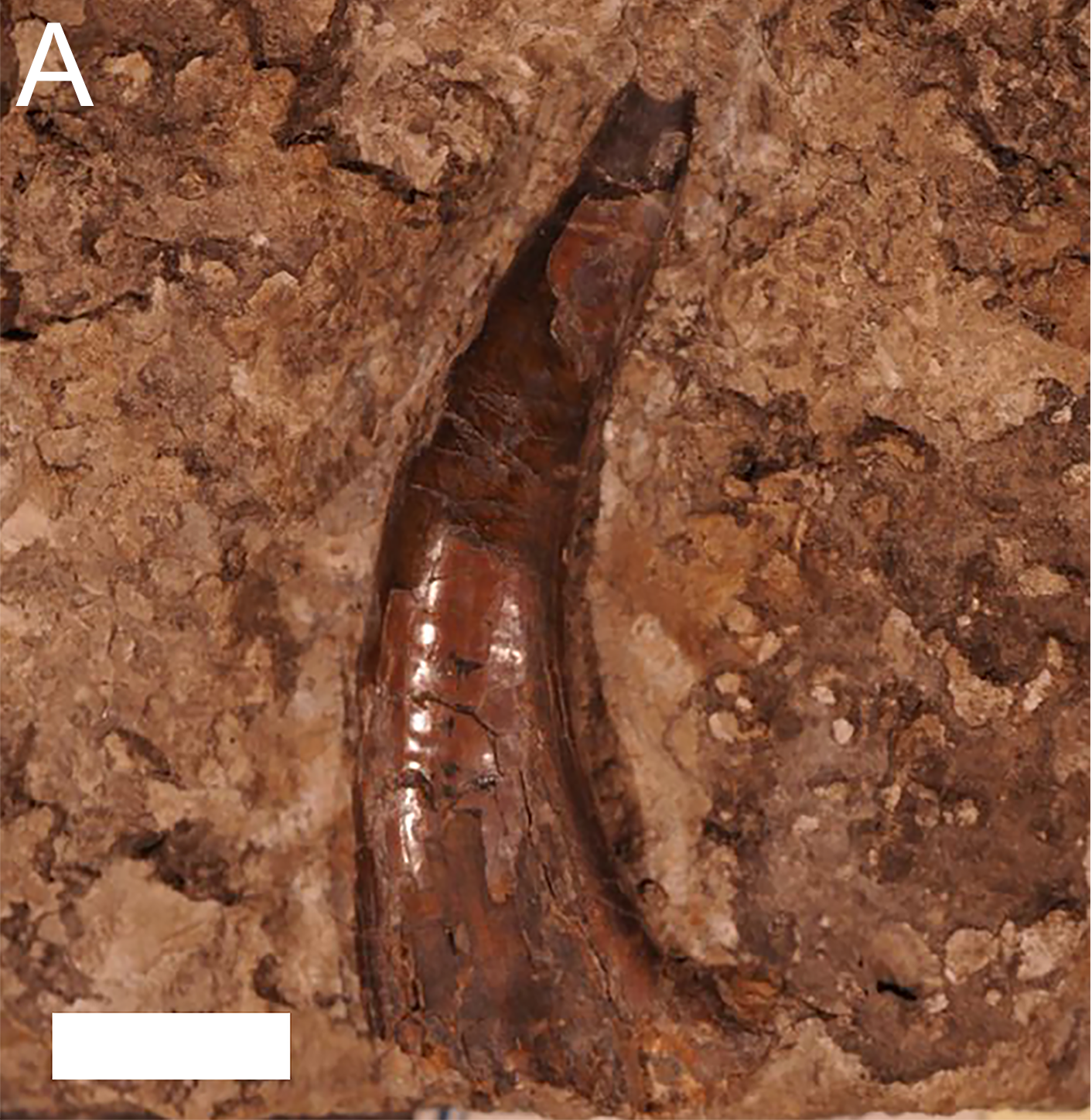
A fossilised Devonian fish of Michigan

Sallan uses big data analytics to study macroevolution, with a particular focus on palaeoichthyology. She uses data mining to identify why some species of fish persist whilst others die off. She joined the University of Pennsylvania in 2014. She leads a large research lab, which includes undergraduate and graduate students. In 2015, she developed a dataset of fish fossils with then undergraduate student Andrew Galimberti. Their analysis showed that during the Devonian period vertebrates gradually increased in size, obeying Cope's rule. She has continued to study the Hangenberg event, finding small-bodied species with rapid reproduction dominate post-extinction communities. She investigated the fossils of the Aetheretmon and found how ray-finned fishes got their tail fins, which are distinct from the tails of land animals. The fossils were recovered from Scotland, and included some of the smallest (3 cm long) and least studied species.

Sallan compiled a comprehensive database of 3,000 fish fossils found between 360 and 480 million years ago. By investigating these fossils, Sallan found that the earliest vertebrate fossils were found near the shore, perhaps due to stronger skeletons due to crashing waves. She studied 31,526 fish species and found the fastest species formation rates occurred in the coldest oceans. Cold water fish form new species at twice the rate of tropical fish. She was named the Martin Meyerson Assistant Professor in Interdisciplinary Studies at the University of Pennsylvania in 2017. The position is for an "outstanding faculty member whose pursuits exemplify the integration of knowledge".

=== Public engagement ===
Sallan was one of fifteen people to be selected as a TED fellow in 2017. In April 2017 she delivered a talk entitled "How to win at evolution and survive a mass extinction". She developed a TEDed class on why fish were fish shaped, and why they didn't swim upside down. She was featured in the popular science book The Ends of the World, written by Peter Brannen. In 2018 Sallan was awarded the University of Chicago Medical and Biological Sciences Distinguished Service Award.

In 2019, Sallan was named as one of 10 TED Senior Fellows. She gave a second TED Talk, "A brief tour of the last 4 billion years (dinosaurs not included)" at TEDSummit 2019 in Edinburgh, Scotland

== Awards and honors ==
- 2009 Palaeontological Association Sylvester-Bradley Award
- 2009 American Society of Ichthyologists and Herpetologists Raney Award
- 2015 International Symposium on Early Vertebrates/Lower Vertebrates Stensiö Award
- 2017 TED Fellow
- 2018 University of Chicago Distinguished Service Award for Early Achievement
- 2019 NSF Award
- 2019 TED Senior Fellow
