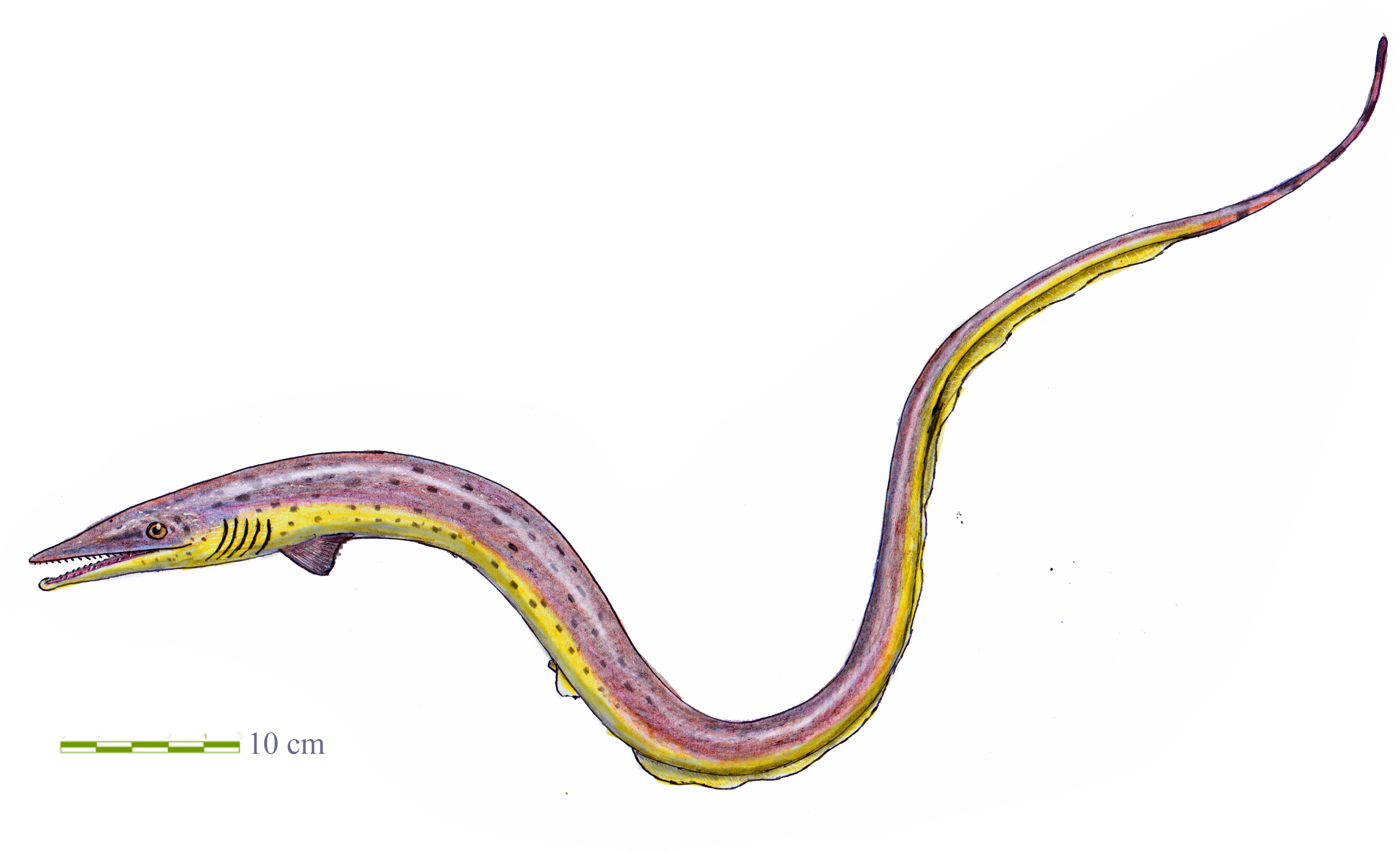
- Restoration of T. gracia
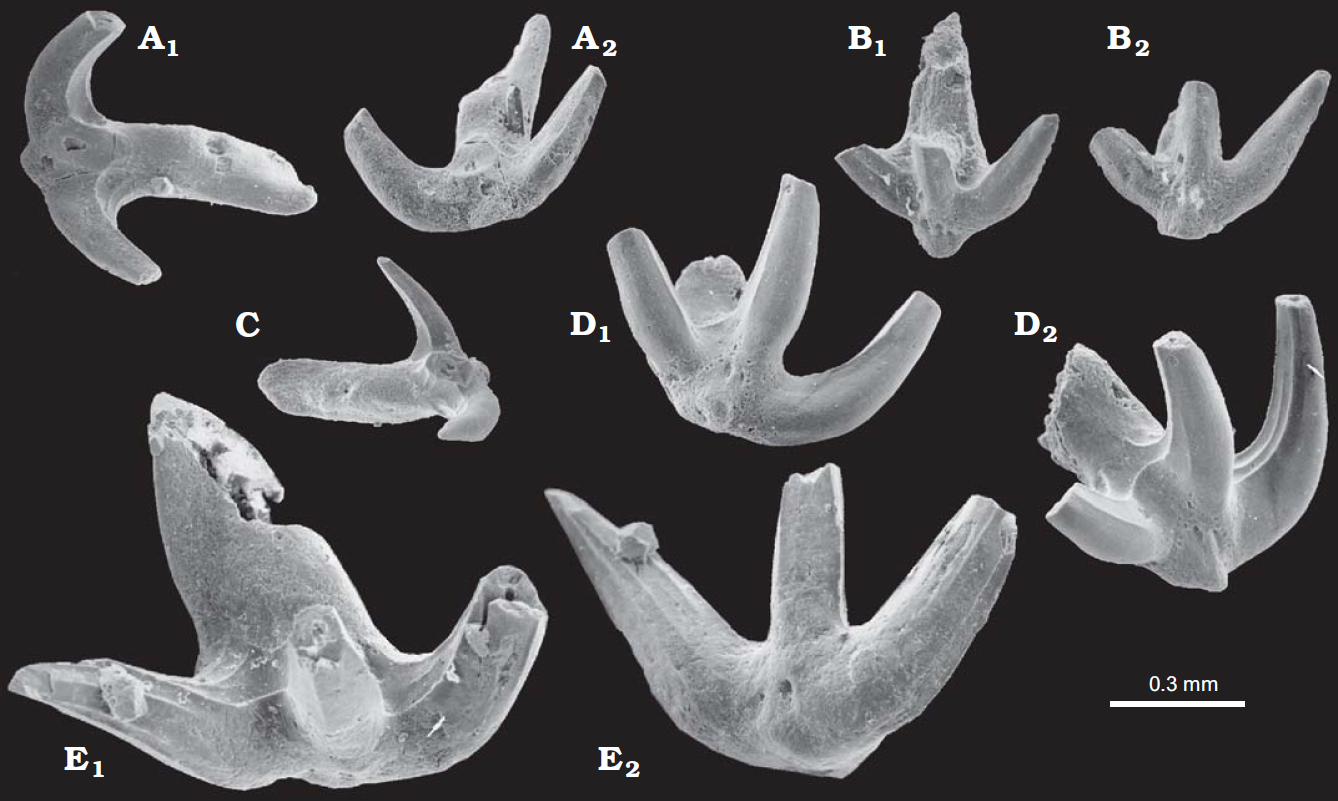
- Teeth of T. dziki

Scientific classification
- Kingdom: Animalia
- Phylum: Chordata
- Class: Chondrichthyes
- Subclass: Elasmobranchii
- Order: †Phoebodontiformes
- Family: †Phoebodontidae
- Genus: †Thrinacodus; St. John and Worthen, 1875

Species
- Thrinacodus bicuspidatus Ginter and Sun, 2007; Thrinacodus dziki Ginter et al. 2014; Thrinacodus ferox (Turner, 1982); Thrinacodus gracia (Grogan & Lund, 2008); Thrinacodus incurvus Newberry and Worthen, 1866; Thrinacodus nanus St. John and Worthen, 1875; Thrinacodus tranquillus Ginter, 2000

Synonyms
- Thrinacoselache Grogan & Lund, 2008

= Thrinacodus =

Thrinacodus Temporal range: Late Devonian-Lower Carboniferous Famennian–Serpukhovian

Extinct genus of cartilaginous fishes

Thrinacodus is an extinct genus of basal elasmobranch, found worldwide from the Late Devonian-Lower Carboniferous. The type species is Thrinacodus nanus. Most species are only known from their tricuspid teeth. T. gracia, originally placed in the separate genus Thrinacoselache from the Serpukhovian-aged Bear Gulch Limestone, of what is now Montana, is known from full body impressions, showing a long, slender eel-like body up to a metre in length, with an elongate rostrum. Stomach contents of T. gracia include remains of crustaceans and small chondrichthyan fish (Harpagofututor and Falcatus). It is a member of the Phoebodontiformes.
