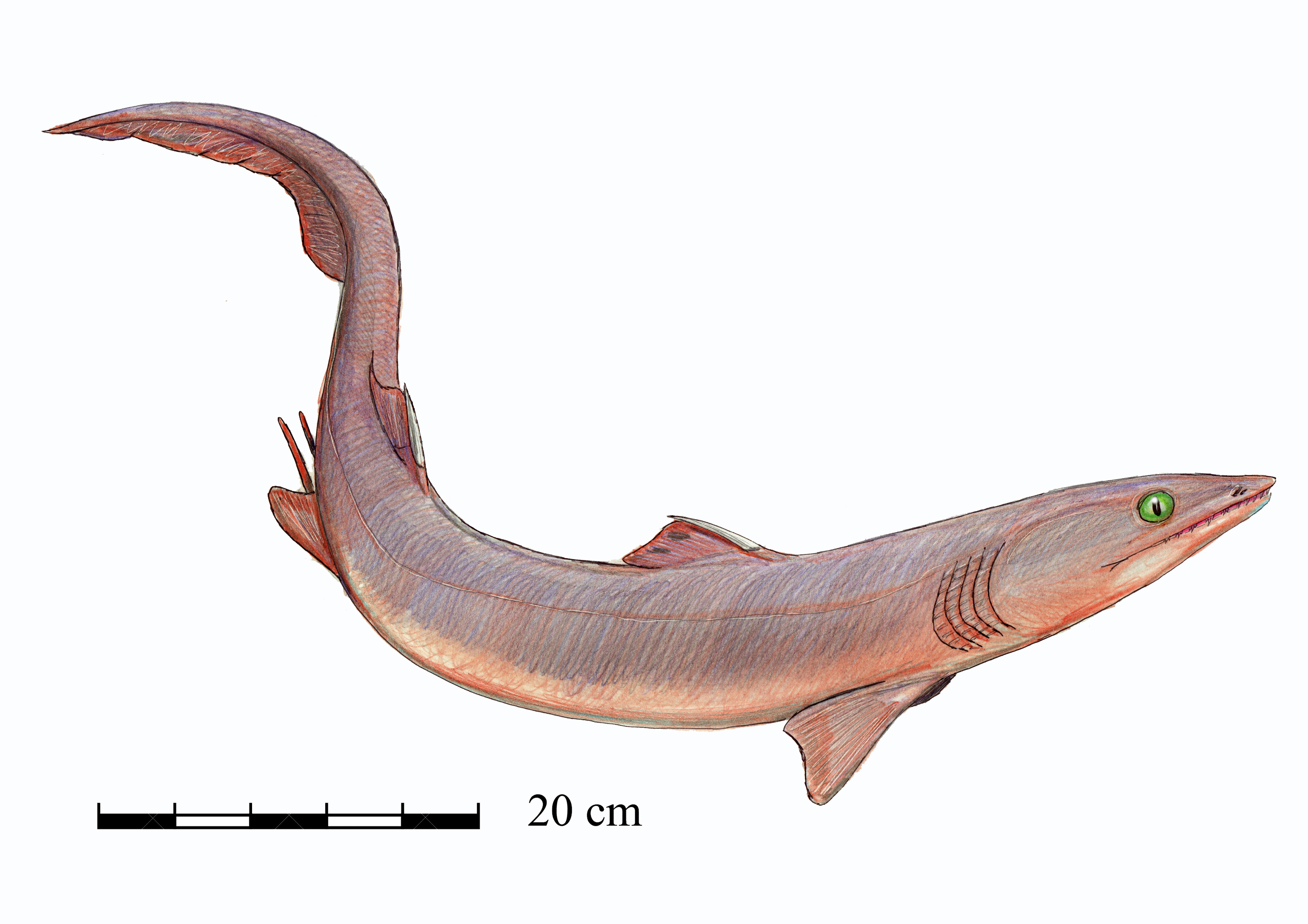
- Life restoration of Phoebodus saidselachus
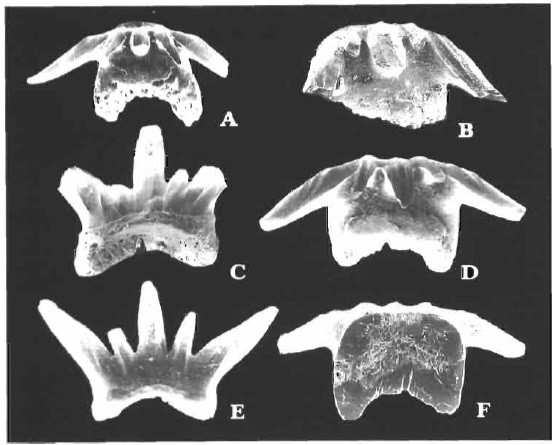
- Teeth of various species of Phoebodus

Scientific classification
- Kingdom: Animalia
- Phylum: Chordata
- Class: Chondrichthyes
- Subclass: Elasmobranchii
- Order: †Phoebodontiformes
- Family: †Phoebodontidae
- Genus: †Phoebodus; St. John and Worthen 1875

Species
- See text

= Phoebodus =

Phoebodus Temporal range: Middle Devonian–Late Devonian

Extinct genus of fishes

Phoebodus is an extinct genus of phoebodontiform total group elasmobranch, known from over a dozen species found worldwide spanning the middle to late Devonian, making it one of the oldest known total group elasmobranchs. Most species are only known from their isolated tricuspid teeth, but one species, Phoebodus saidselachus from the Late Devonian of Morocco, is known from a complete skeleton, estimated to have been 1.2 metres (3.9 ft) in total length in life, which shows that it had a slender body superficially similar to that of the living frilled shark. The teeth of Phoebodus and frilled sharks are also morphologically similar, and are designed for grasping prey. Phoebodus probably consumed small prey items that were capable of being swallowed whole. Prey of Phoebodus would have included thylacocephalans or cephalopods (such as ammonoids, bactritids and orthocerids).

== Species ==
After Ivanov, 2021

- Phoebodus sophiae St. John & Worthen, 1875 (type). Australia, Iran, Mauritania, Poland, Spain, Portugal, United States (Indiana, Iowa, New York), Russia (Siberia). Middle Devonian (Givetian)
- Phoebodus fastigatus Ginter & Ivanov, 1992. Australia, Mauritania, Morocco, Russia (Urals), Poland, Spain, United States (New York, Iowa, Utah, Indiana). Middle-Late Devonian (Givetian-upper Frasnian)
- Phoebodus curvatus Ivanov, 2021. Russia (Urals), Poland, Australia. Middle-Late Devonian (upper Givetian-upper Frasnian)
- Phoebodus latus Ginter & Ivanov, 1995. Australia, Russia (Urals, Siberia), Poland, Iran. Middle-Late Devonian (latest Givetian-upper Frasnian)
- Phoebodus bifurcatus Ginter & Ivanov, 1992. Australia, China, Mauritania, Iran, Poland, Czechia, Belgium, United States (Utah), Russia (Urals). Late Devonian (upper Frasnian)
- Phoebodus typicus Ginter & Ivanov, 1995. Australia, Morocco, Iran, Russia (Urals, Siberia). Late Devonian (lower-mid Famennian), forms labelled P. cf. typicus occur in the middle Famennian of Belarus and Armenia, and the upper Famennian of Siberia
- Phoebodus rayi Ginter & Turner, 1999. Australia, Canada, Iran. Late Devonian (lower-mid Famennian), forms labelled P. cf. typicus occur in Iran and Lithuania, ranging into the early late Fammenian
- Phoebodus turnerae Ginter & Ivanov, 1992 Algeria, Armenia, Belarus, Belgium, Iran, Poland, Morocco, United States (Alaska). Late Devonian (Famennian)
- Phoebodus gothicus Ginter, 1990. Russia (Urals), Iran, Armenia, Algeria, Morocco, Germany, France, Poland, United States (Ohio, Utah, Iowa), south China. Late Devonian (Famennian)
- Phoebodus depressus Ginter, Hairapetian & Klug, 2002. Algeria. Late Devonian (lower-mid Famennian), P. cf. depressus is known from Iran
- Phoebodus saidselachus Frey et al. 2019. Morocco. Late Devonian (early-mid Famennian)
- Phoebodus limpidus Ginter, 1990. Italy, south China, Russia (Urals, North Caucasus), Morocco, Poland, France, Germany, United States (Nevada, Wyoming, Utah). Late Devonian (mid-upper Famennian)
- Phoebodus politus Newberry, 1889. United States (Ohio). Late Devonian (upper Famennian)

Supposed species in this genus from the Triassic, like "Phoebodus" brodiei, and "Phoebodus" keuperinus are now placed in the genus Keuperodus in the family Jalodontidae.
