= Isadia =

Isadia Temporal range: Capitanian to Wuchiapingian

Scientific classification
- Kingdom: Animalia
- Phylum: Chordata
- Class: Actinopterygii
- Order: †Eurynotoidiformes
- Family: †Eurynotoidiidae
- Genus: †Isadia; Minikh, 1986

Species
- See text

Extinct genus of fishes

Isadia is an extinct genus of prehistoric freshwater ray-finned fish from the order Eurynotoidiformes. It is known from the Permian of European Russia. The genus Amblypterina is partially considered a junior synonym of both Isadia and Kichkassia.

The following species are known:

- I. arefievi Minikh, Arefiev & Golubev, 2015 - Wuchiapingian of Vologda, Russia (Salarevskaya Formation)
- I. aristoviensis Minikh, 1990 (syn: Amblypterina grandicostata) - Capitanian to Wuchiapingian of Vologda & Orenburg, Russia (Vyazovskaya, Kutuluk & Kulchumovskaya Formations)
- I. opokiensis Minikh & Andrushkevich, 2017 - Capitanian to Wuchiapingian of Vologda, Russia (Poldarsky Formation)
- I. suchonensis Minikh, 1986 (syn: Amblypterina pectinata) - Capitanian to Wuchiapingian of Vologda & Orenburg, Russia (Poldarsky & Malokinelskaya Formations)

Based on an extensive review of tooth morphology, Isadia was a herbivorous fish that predominantly fed on algae. I. suchonensis had teeth adapted for shearing off algae in manner similar to a surgeonfish, I. opokiensis & I. arefievi had teeth adapted for scraping algae off rocks similar to certain cichlids, and I. aristoviensis cropped parts of large algae and submerged vascular plants in a manner similar to rabbitfish. Based on this morphology, Isadia can be divided into two evolutionary lineages: one lineage comprising I. suchonensis→I. opokiensis→I. arefievi, and one lineage comprising just I. aristoviensis.

== See also ==
- Prehistoric fish
- List of prehistoric bony fish
