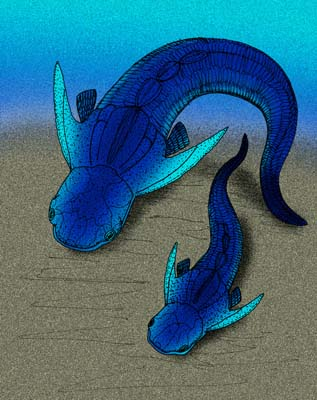
- Quasipetalichthys, the type genus

Scientific classification
- Kingdom: Animalia
- Phylum: Chordata
- Class: †Placodermi
- Order: †Petalichthyida
- Family: †Quasipetalichthyidae

Type genus
- Quasipetalichthys Liu, 1973

Genera
- Eurycaraspis; Quasipetalichthys; Yipetalichthys

= Quasipetalichthyidae =

Quasipetalichthyidae Temporal range: Givetian

Extinct family of fishes

Quasipetalichthyidae is an extinct family of primitive petalichthyid placoderms from Givetian-aged marine strata of Yunnan, China, and possibly Vietnam.

== Anatomy ==
The family differ from the more advanced macropetalichthyids by having more squared skulls that have the eye sockets placed on the side of their skulls, rather than nearer to the center. More basal petalichthyids, such as Diandongpetalichthys and Neopetalichthys, differ from the Quasipetalichthyidae by having comparatively elongated skulls.

Synapomorphies of the family include the presence of a posterior descending lamina, the absence of a supraorbital process, the posterior position of the ossification center of the nuchal plate, and the roundness of the preorbital plate.
