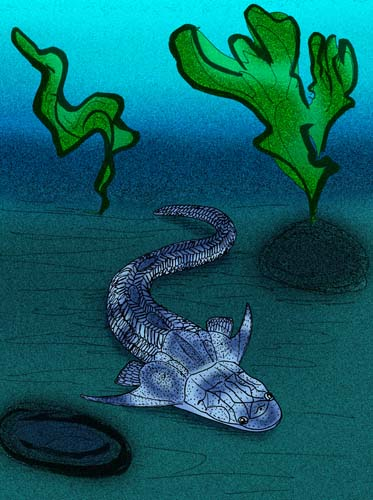

Scientific classification
- Kingdom: Animalia
- Phylum: Chordata
- Class: Placodermi
- Order: Petalichthyida †
- Genus: Diandongpetalichthys
- Species: D. liaojiaoshanensis

Binomial name
- Diandongpetalichthys liaojiaoshanensis P'an & Wang, 1978

= Diandongpetalichthys =

Diandongpetalichthys Temporal range: Lochkovian

Extinct petalichthyid placoderm

Diandongpetalichthys liaojiaoshanensis is an extinct petalichthyid placoderm from the Early Devonian of China.

== Fossils ==
Several specimens, in the forms of one complete and several incomplete skull roofs, disarticulated portions of the trunk shield, and spines, are known, found in the Devonian aged Liaojiaoshan Hill of Qujing, Yunnan, a non-marine portion of the Xishancun Formation, in the Cuifengshan Group.

== Phylogeny ==
The holotype of D. liaojiaoshanensis is a poorly preserved, incomplete skull roof, and was, at the time of its description in 1978, regarded as "Petalichthyida incertae sedis. In light of more, better preserved specimens that show features in common with primitive arthrodires, such as actinolepids and the phlyctaeniids, D. liaojiaoshanensis is now regarded as a basal petalichthyid.
