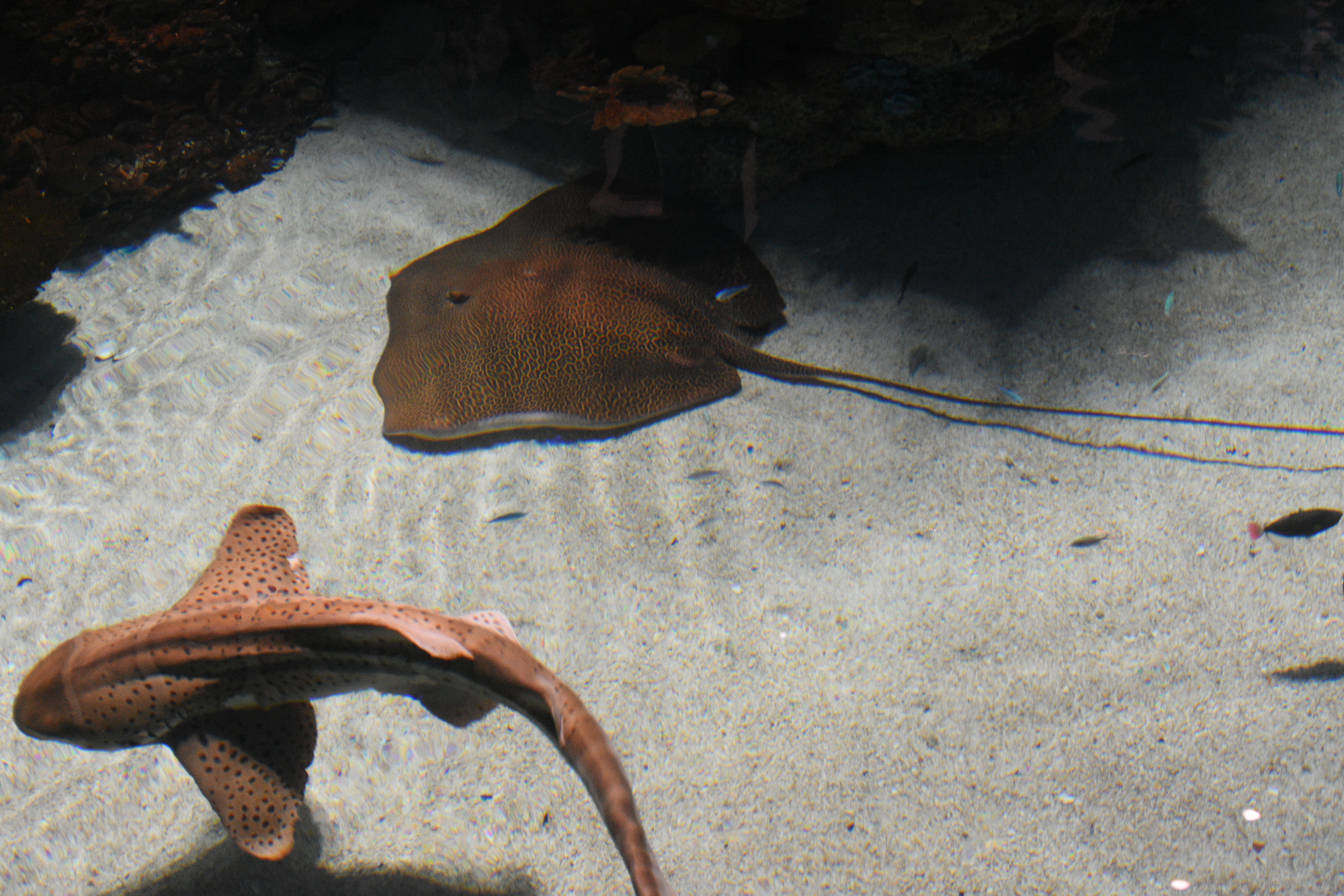
- Representatives of the two extant divisions of elasmobranchs: a reticulate whipray (Himantura uarnak) (top), a batomorph; and a zebra shark (Stegostoma tigrinum) (bottom left), a shark, at the National Aquarium in Baltimore
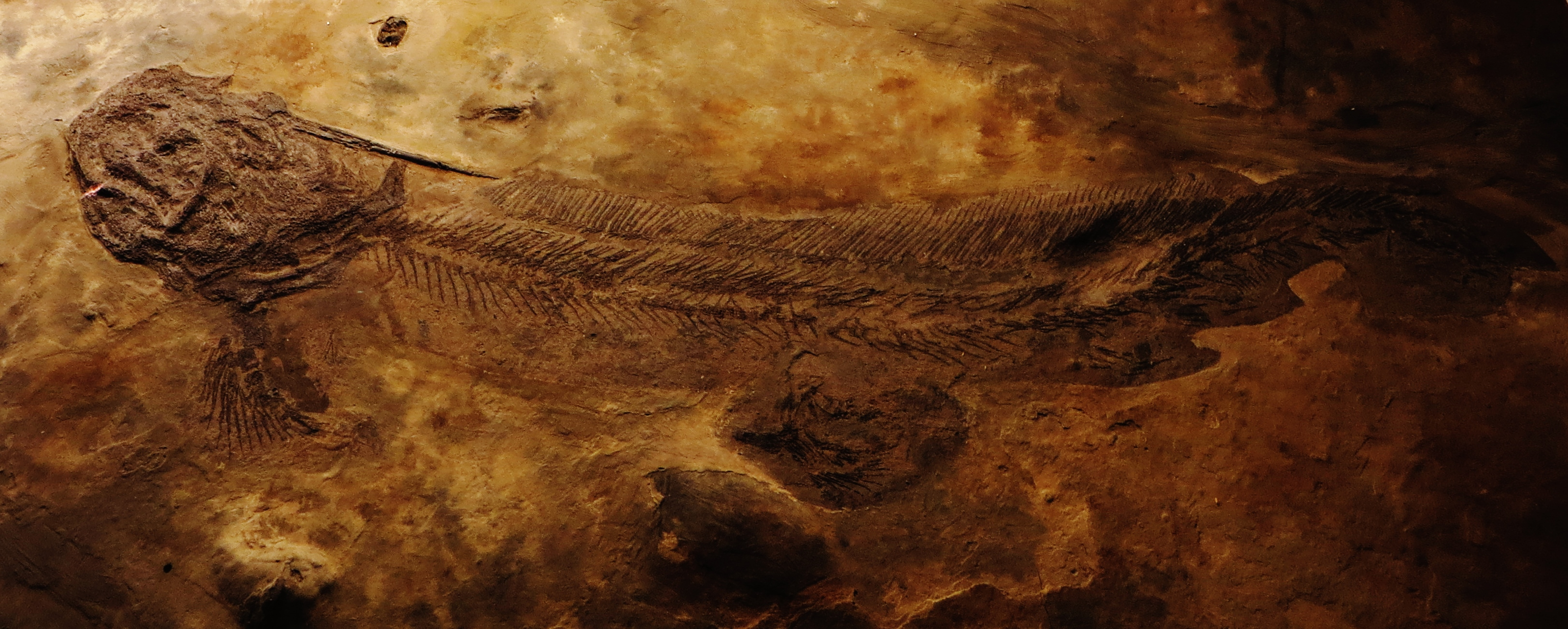
- Fossil skeleton of Triodus sessilis, a xenacanth

Scientific classification
- Kingdom: Animalia
- Phylum: Chordata
- Class: Chondrichthyes
- Clade: Euselachii
- Subclass: Elasmobranchii; Bonaparte, 1838

Major subgroups (total group)
- †Ctenacanthiformes; †Xenacanthiformes; †Phoebodontiformes; Euselachii; †Hybodontiformes; Neoselachii; Selachii (modern sharks); Batoidea (rays and skates); For others, see text

= Elasmobranchii =

Elasmobranchs Temporal range: Givetian–Recent

Subclass of fishes

Elasmobranchii (/ɪˌlæzməˈbræŋkiaɪ/) is a subclass of Chondrichthyes or cartilaginous fish, including modern sharks (division Selachii), and batomorphs (division Batomorphi, including rays, skates, and sawfish). Members of this subclass are characterised by having five to seven pairs of gill slits opening individually to the exterior, rigid dorsal fins and small placoid scales on the skin. The teeth are in several series; the upper jaw is not fused to the cranium, and the lower jaw is articulated with the upper. The details of this jaw anatomy vary between species, and help distinguish the different elasmobranch clades. The pelvic fins in males are modified to create claspers for the transfer of sperm. There is no swim bladder; instead, these fish maintain buoyancy with large livers rich in oil.

The definition of the clade is unclear with respect to fossil chondrichthyans. Some authors consider it as equivalent to Neoselachii (the crown group clade including modern sharks, rays, and all other descendants of their last common ancestor). Other authors use the name Elasmobranchii for a broader branch-based group of all chondrichthyans more closely related to modern sharks and rays than to Holocephali (the clade containing chimaeras and their extinct relatives). Important extinct groups of elasmobranchs sensu lato include the hybodonts (Order Hybodontiformes), xenacanths (order Xenacanthformes) and Ctenacanthiformes. These are also often referred to as "sharks" in reference to their similar anatomy and ecology to modern sharks.

The name Elasmobranchii comes from the Ancient Greek words elasmo- ("plate") and bránchia ("gill"), referring to the broad, flattened gills which are characteristic of these fishes.

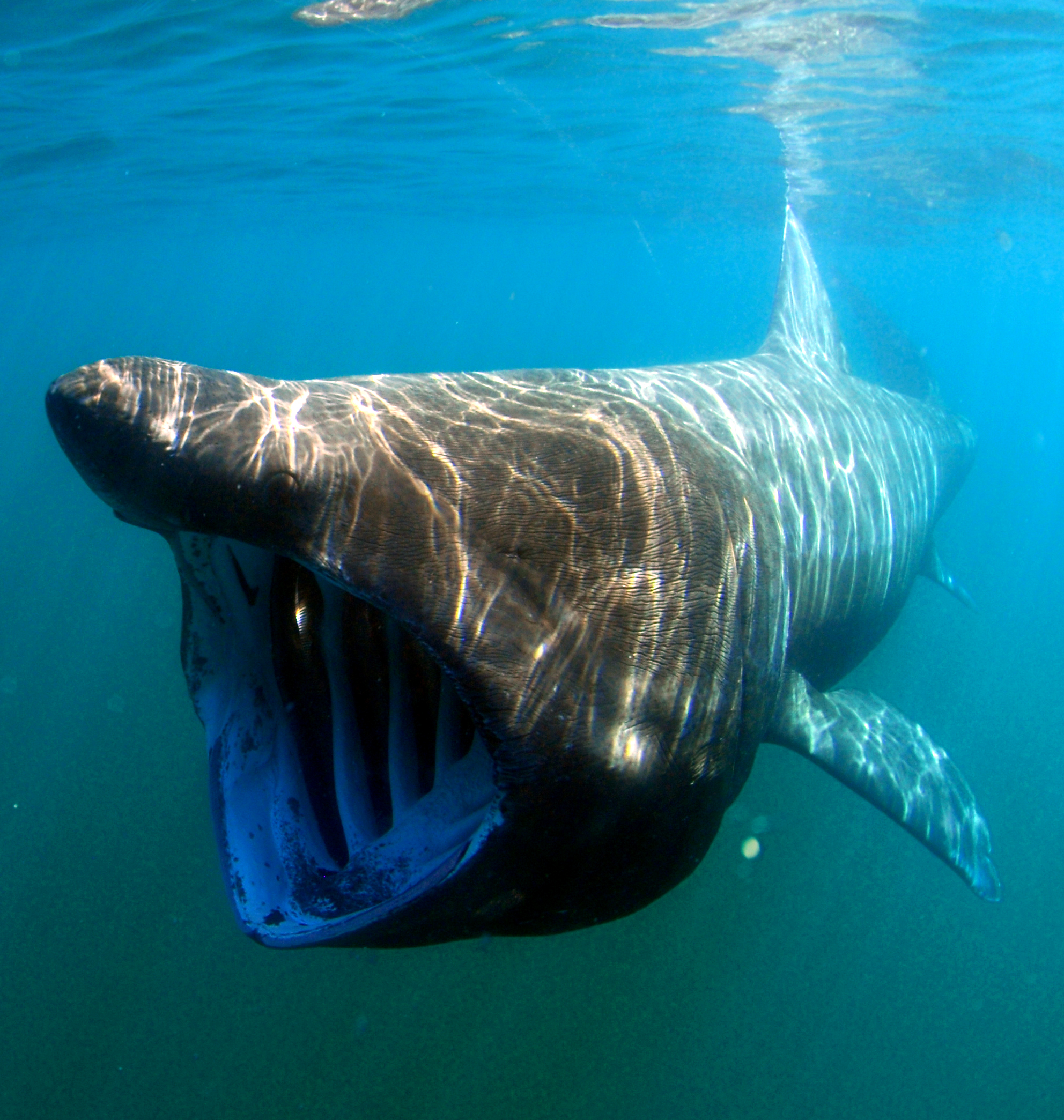

Elasmobranchs lack swim bladders, and maintain buoyancy with oil that they store in their livers. Some deep sea sharks are targeted by fisheries for this liver oil, including the school, gulper and basking sharks (pictured). All three of these species have been assessed by the IUCN as vulnerable due to overfishing.

From a practical point of view the life-history pattern of elasmobranchs makes this group of animals extremely susceptible to over fishing. It is no coincidence that the commercially exploited marine turtles and baleen whales, which have life-history patterns similar to the sharks, are also in trouble.

== Description ==
Members of the Elasmobranchii subclass have no swim bladders, five to seven pairs of gill clefts opening individually to the exterior, rigid dorsal fins, and small placoid scales. The teeth are in several series; the upper jaw is not fused to the cranium, and the lower jaw is articulated with the upper.

Extant elasmobranchs exhibit several archetypal jaw suspensions: amphistyly, orbitostyly, hyostyly, and euhyostyly. In amphistyly, the palatoquadrate has a postorbital articulation with the chondrocranium from which ligaments primarily suspend it anteriorly. The hyoid articulates with the mandibular arch posteriorly, but it appears to provide little support to the upper and lower jaws. In orbitostyly, the orbital process hinges with the orbital wall and the hyoid provides the majority of suspensory support.

In contrast, hyostyly involves an ethmoid articulation between the upper jaw and the cranium, while the hyoid most likely provides vastly more jaw support compared to the anterior ligaments. Finally, in euhyostyly, also known as true hyostyly, the mandibular cartilages lack a ligamentous connection to the cranium. Instead, the hyomandibular cartilages provide the only means of jaw support, while the ceratohyal and basihyal elements articulate with the lower jaw, but are disconnected from the rest of the hyoid. The eyes have a tapetum lucidum. The inner margin of each pelvic fin in the male fish is grooved to constitute a clasper for the transmission of sperm. These fish are widely distributed in tropical and temperate waters.

Many fish maintain buoyancy with swim bladders. However elasmobranchs lack swim bladders, and maintain buoyancy instead with large livers that are full of oil. This stored oil may also function as a nutrient when food is scarce.

== Evolutionary history ==
The oldest unambiguous total group elasmobranch, Phoebodus, has its earliest records in the Middle Devonian (late Givetian), around 383 million years ago. Several important groups of total group elasmobranchs, including Ctenacanthiformes and Hybodontiformes, had already emerged by the latest Devonian (Famennian). During the Carboniferous, some ctenacanths would grow to sizes rivalling the modern great white shark with bodies in the region of 7 metres (23 ft) in length. During the Carboniferous and Permian, the xenacanths were abundant in both freshwater and marine environments, and would continue to exist into the Triassic with reduced diversity. The hybodonts had achieved a high diversity by the Permian, and would end up becoming the dominant group of elasmobranchs during the Triassic and Early Jurassic. Hybodonts were extensively present in both marine and freshwater environments. While Neoselachii/Elasmobranchi sensu stricto (the group of modern sharks and rays) had already appeared by the Triassic, they only had low diversity during this period and only began to extensively diversify from the Early Jurassic onwards, when modern orders of sharks and rays appeared. This co-incided with the decline of the hybodonts, which had become minor components of marine environments by the Late Jurassic but would remain common in freshwater environments into the Cretaceous. The youngest remains of hybodonts date to the very end of the Cretaceous.

== Taxonomy ==
Elasmobranchii was first coined in 1838 by Charles Lucien Bonaparte. Bonaparte's original definition of Elasmobranchii was effectively identical to modern Chondrichthyes, and was based around gill architecture shared by all 3 living major cartilaginous fish groups. During the 20th century it became standard to exclude chimaeras from Elasmobranchii; along with including many fossil chondrichthyans within the group. The definition of Elasmobranchii has since been subject to much confusion with regard to fossil chondrichthyans. Maisey (2012) suggested that Elasmobranchii should exclusively be used for the last common ancestor of modern sharks and rays, a grouping which had previously been named Neoselachii by Compagno (1977). Other recent authors have used Elasmobranchii in a broad sense to include all chondrichthyans more closely related to modern sharks and rays than to chimaeras.

The total group of Elasmobranchii includes the cohort Euselachii Hay, 1902, which groups the Hybodontiformes and a number of other extinct chondrichthyans with Elasmobrachii sensu stricto/Neoselachii, to the exclusion of more primitive total group elasmobranchs, which is supported by a number of shared morphological characters of the skeleton.

- Total group Elasmobranchii
  - †Order Phoebodontiformes
  - †Order Squatinactiformes
  - †Order Xenacanthiformes
  - †Order Ctenacanthiformes
  - †Order Jalodontiformes
  - †Bandringa
  - Infraclass Euselachii
    - †Order Hybodontiformes
    - †Family Protacrodontidae
    - †Family Tristychiidae
      - Tristychius
      - Acronemus
    - †Artiodus
    - Division Neoselachii (Elasmobranchii sensu stricto)
      - †Family Anachronistidae
      - †Order Synechodontiformes (incertae sedis)
      - Subdivision Selachii (Selachimorpha) (modern sharks)
        - Superorder Galeomorphi
          - Order Heterodontiformes (bullhead sharks)
          - Order Orectolobiformes (carpet sharks)
          - Order Lamniformes (mackerel sharks)
          - Order Carcharhiniformes (ground sharks)
        - Superorder Squalomorphi
          - Order Echinorhiniformes (bramble sharks)
          - Order Hexanchiformes (frilled and cow sharks)
          - Order Squaliformes (dogfish sharks)
          - †Family Protospinacidae
          - Order Squatiniformes (angel sharks)
          - Order Pristiophoriformes (sawsharks)
      - Subdivision Batoidea (rays, skates, and sawfish)
        - Order Torpediniformes (electric rays)
        - Order Rhinopristiformes (sawfishes, guitar fishes, wedgefishes and relatives)
        - Order Rajiformes (skates and relatives)
        - Order Myliobatiformes (stingrays and relatives)

The 5th edition of Fishes of the World sets out the following classification of the Elasmobranchs:

- Infraclass Elasmobranchii
  - Division Selachii (sharks)
    - Superorder Galeomorphi
      - †Order Synechodontiformes
      - Order Heterodontiformes
      - Order Orectolobiformes
        - Suborder Parascyllioidei
        - Suborder Orectoloboidei
      - Order Lamniformes
      - Order Carcharhiniformes
    - Superorder Squalomorphi
      - Series Hexanchida
        - Order Hexanchiformes
      - Series Squalida
        - Order Squaliformes
      - Series Squatinida
        - †Order Protospinaciformes
        - Order Echinorhiniformes
        - Order Squatiniformes
        - Order Pristiophoriformes
  - Division Batomorphi (rays)
    - Order Torpediniformes
    - Order Rajiformes
    - Order Pristiformes
    - Order Myliobatiformes
      - Suborder Platyrhinoidei
      - Suborder Myliobatoidei

Recent molecular studies suggest the Batoidea are not derived selachians as previously thought. Instead, skates and rays are a monophyletic superorder within Elasmobranchii that shares a common ancestor with the selachians.

== See also ==
Osteichthyes
