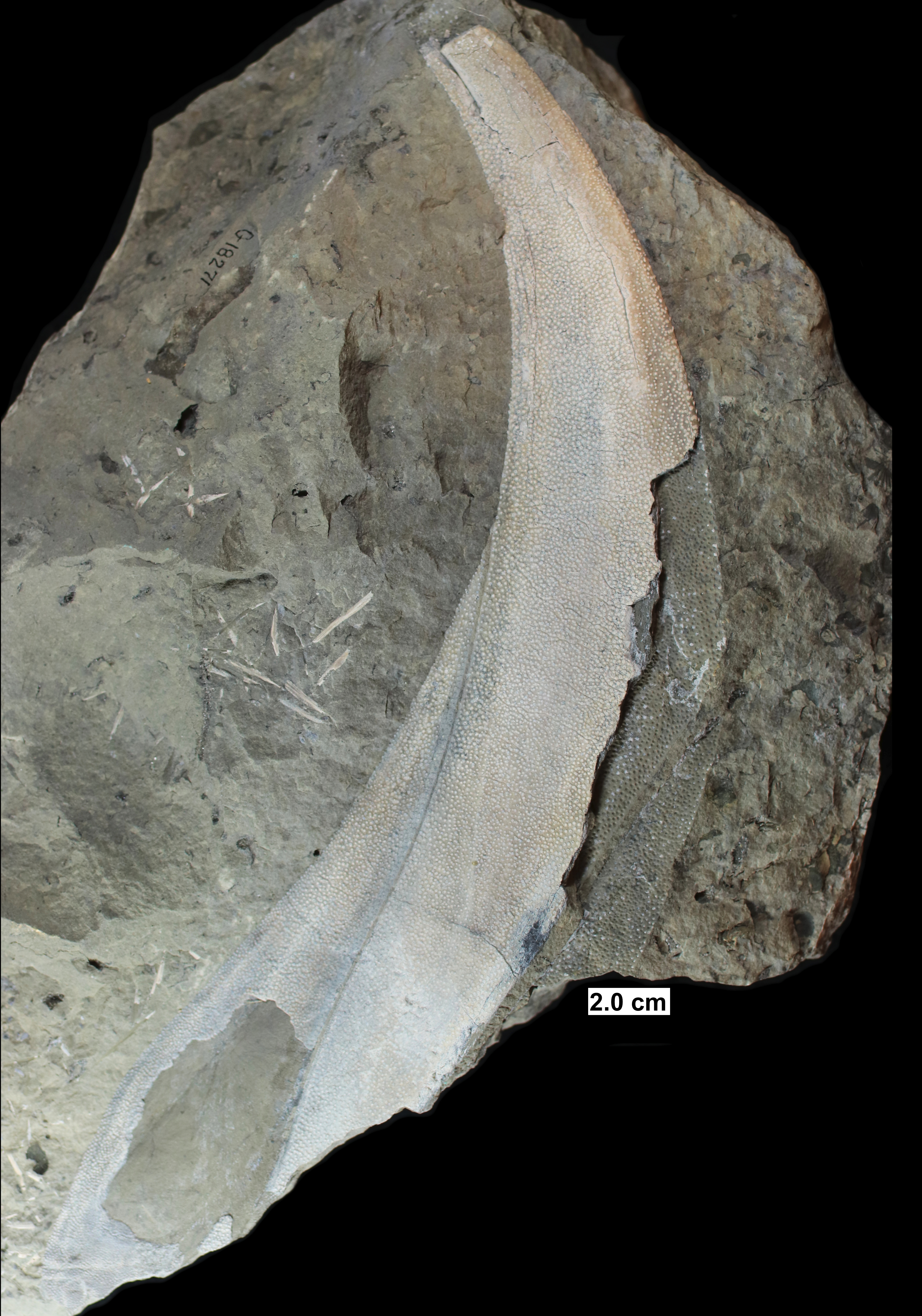
- Fin spine UWM-GM 1827 of Eczematolepis .sp from the Milwaukee Formation of Wisconsin

Scientific classification
- Kingdom: Animalia
- Phylum: Chordata
- Class: †Placodermi
- Order: †Ptyctodontida
- Family: †Ptyctodontidae
- Genus: †Eczematolepis; Miller, 1892

Type species
- †Eczematolepis fragilis Newberry, 1857

Other species
- †E. pustulosus Newberry, 1875; †E. telleri Eastman, 1898

Synonyms
- Acantholepis Newberry, 1875 (preoccupied); Phlyctsenacanthus telleri Eastman, 1898

= Eczematolepis =

Eczematolepis Temporal range: Middle Devonian, Givetian

Extinct genus of fishes

Eczematolepis is an extinct genus of ptyctodontidan from the Milwaukee Formation of Wisconsin. Three species are known: E. fragilis, E. pustulosus and E. telleri. It was originally classified as the genus Acantholepis but that name was preoccupied.
