= Acantholepis =

Acantholepis is the scientific name of several genera of organisms. It may refer to:

- Echinops, a genus of plants; synonym Acantholepis (Less.)
- Argentina, a genus of fish; synonym Acantholepis (Krøyer, 1846)
- Lepisiota, a genus of ants; synonym Acantholepis (Mayr, 1861)
- Eczematolepis, an extinct genus of ptyctodontidan
