= Hunsrück Slate =

Geological formation in Germany

- Stratigraphic range: latest Pragian to early Emsian 408–400 Ma
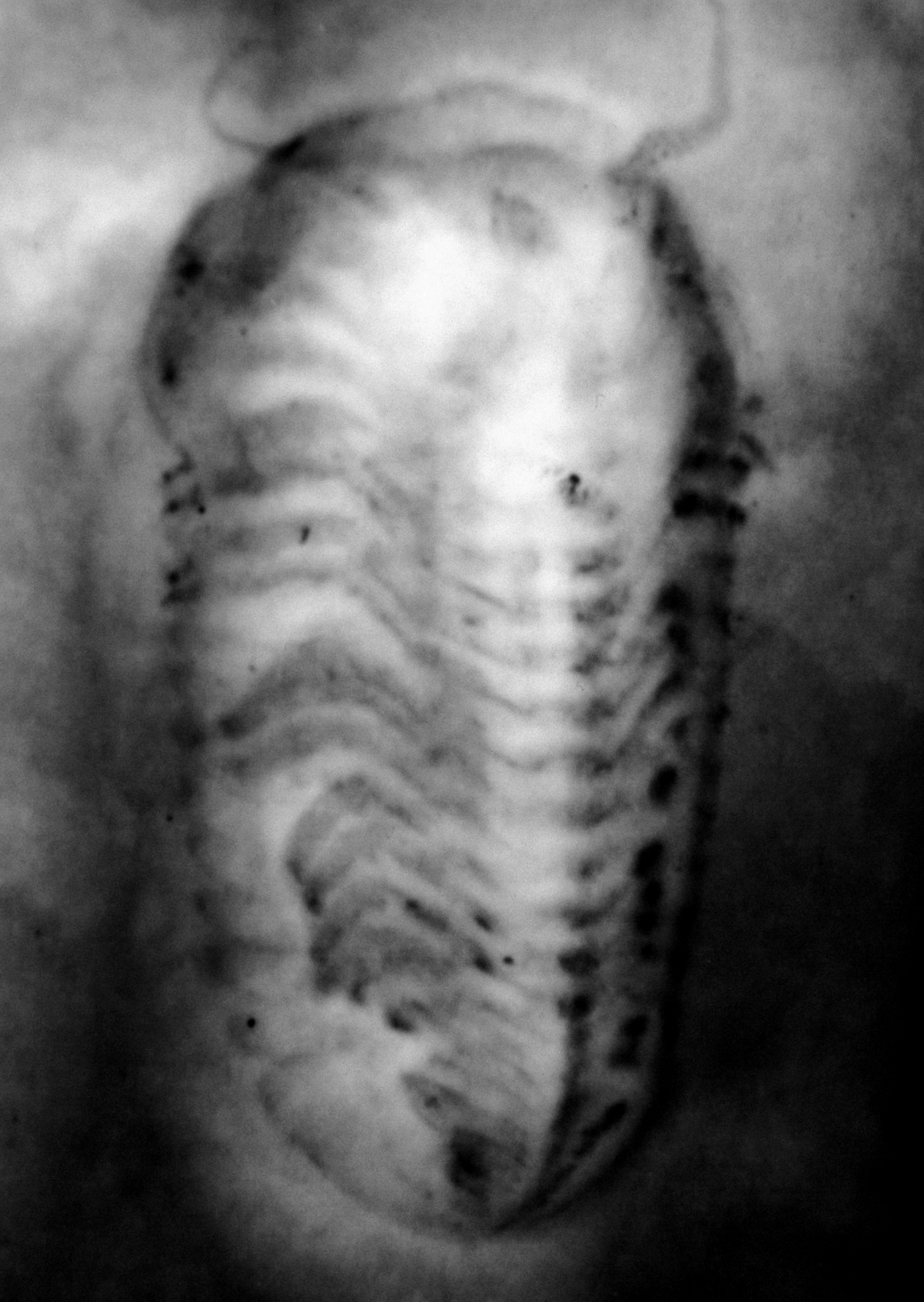
- X-ray photograph of fossil of Chotecops ferdianandi, a common trilobite from Hunsrück Slate
- Type: Geological formation

Lithology
- Primary: Slate

Location
- Region: Hunsrück
- Country: Germany

The Hunsrück Slate (German: Hunsrück-Schiefer) is a Lower Devonian lithostratigraphic unit, a type of rock strata, in the German regions of the Hunsrück and Taunus. It is a lagerstätte famous for exceptional preservation of a highly diverse fossil fauna assemblage.

== Geology ==
The Emsian stratigraphy of the southern Rhenish Massif can be divided into two lithological units: the older slates of the Hunsrück-Schiefer and the younger sandstones of the Singhofener Schichten. Stratigraphically below the Hunsrück Slates is the (older) Taunus quartzite. All these metasedimentary rocks were originally deposited in the marine Rhenohercynian Basin, a back-arc basin south of the paleocontinent of Laurussia.

The Hunsrück Slate roughly comprises the Sauerthal-Schichten, Bornich-Schichten and Kaub-Schichten. These are 408–400 Mya old, making them part of the Latest Pragian to Early Emsian stages of the Devonian.

== History of mining ==
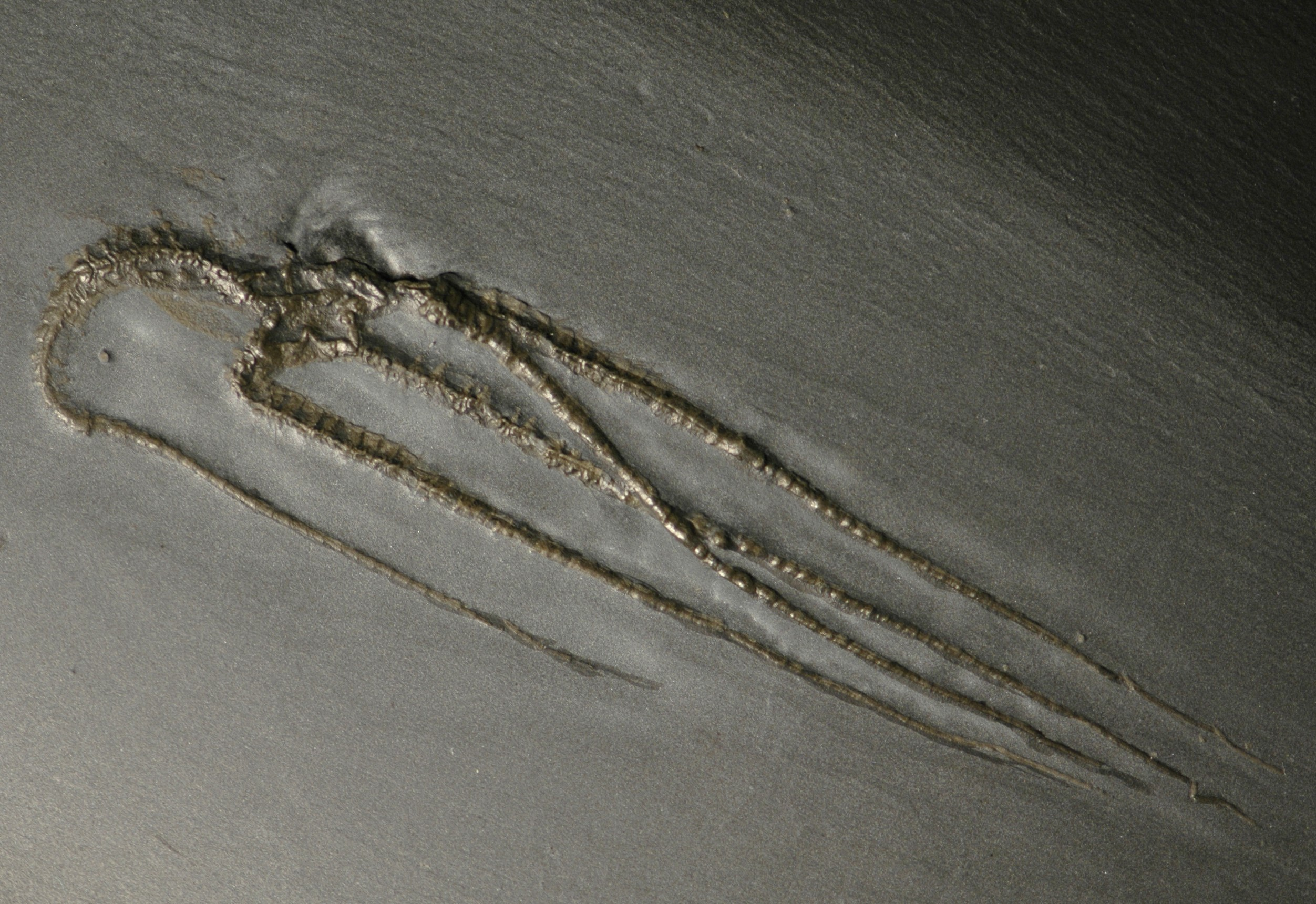
Pyritized Furcaster paleozoicus Stürtz, 1886 (8.5 centimeters long), a fossil brittle star (ophiuroid) from the Hunsrück Lagerstätte. All five arms are bent in the same direction, indicating current direction before final burial

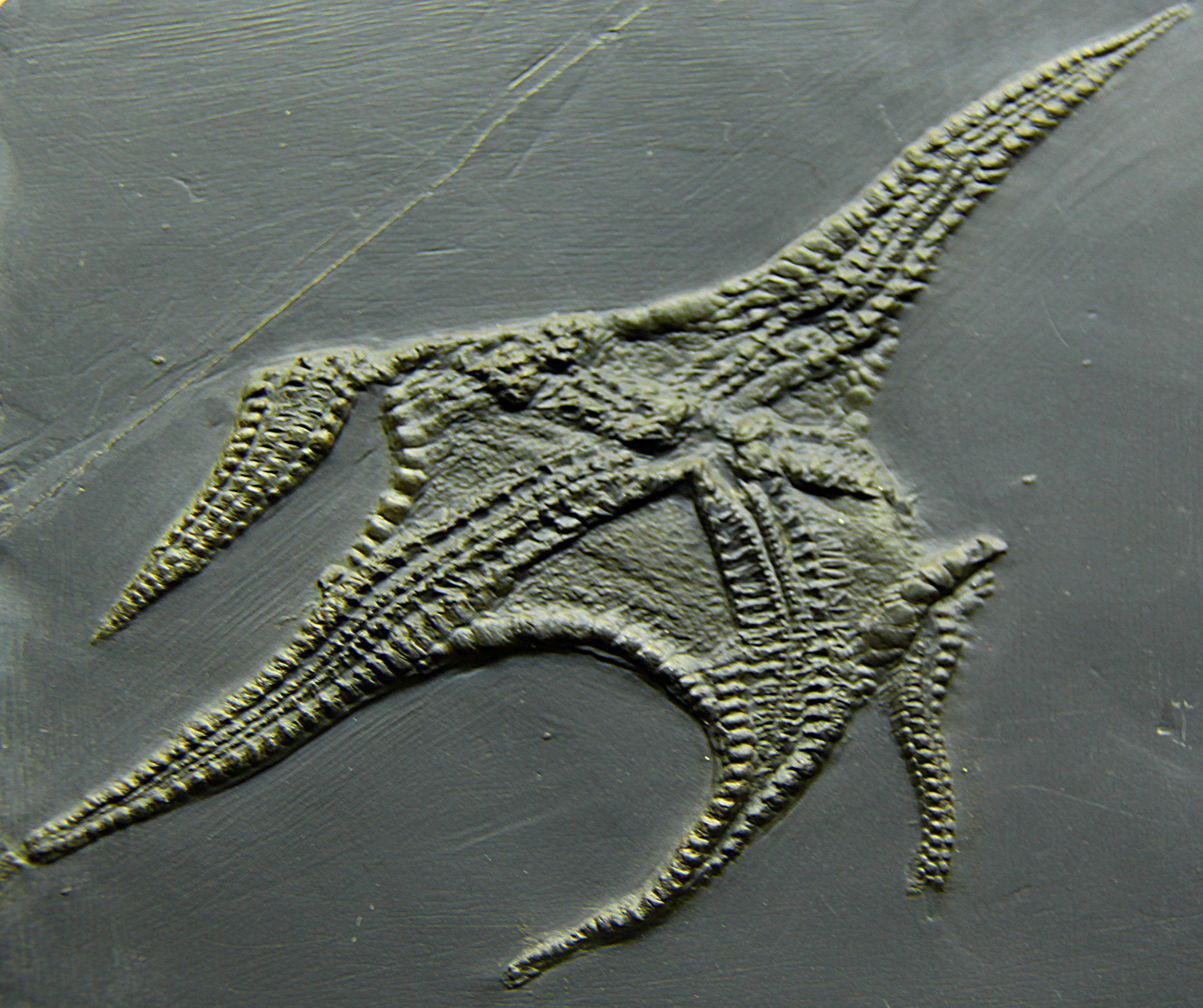
Pyritized Euzonosoma tischbeiniana Bundenbach, an extinct seastar, with soft-tissue webbing well-preserved between the arms. An exceptional Hunsrück fossil

The Hunsrück slate was a source for Rhenish slate over several centuries. Archaeological finds in West Germany show that the slate was used in Roman times. The first documented case of mining in this area dates from the 14th century. The production continued with the Industrial Revolution at the end of the 1700s, but in 1846–49, the industry fell into crisis, resulting in poverty and misery in the mining areas.

The economic upturn after the Franco-Prussian War of 1870-71 resulted in a renewed increase in slate production, where companies used more extensive pits. Production continued until the 1960s, when the competition from cheaper synthetic or imported slate resulted in production decline. Only a single pit in the Bundenbach region was worked in the 1990s. Since 1999, slate imports from Spain, Portugal, Argentina and China caused the abandonment of local mining.

Mining of Hunsrück slate was important for the discovery of fossils. Although not rare, fossils can only be found through extensive mining of slate. Many of the fine fossils exhibited in museums today were originally found by the slate miners. The first scientific publication on these fossils comes from Ferdinand von Roemer (1862), who described starfish and crinoid fossils from Bundenbach. German paleontologists such as R. Opitz, F. Broili, R. Judge, and W. M. Lehmann studied many fossils between 1920 and 1959. Lehmann's death in 1959 and the decline of the slate industry caused a decline in fossil research.

In 1970, Wilhelm Stürmer, a chemical physicist and radiologist at Siemens, developed a new method to examine the Hunsrück slate fossils using medium energy X-rays of 25-40 keV. He created high-resolution movies and stereoscopic images of unopened slates, which showed complex details of soft tissues that cannot be made visible with conventional methods. In the 1990s, Christoph Bartels and Günther Brassel have continued this work.

== Paleontology ==
The various fossil localities are quarries located mostly south of the River Mosel and west of the Rhine in western Germany. The biota of the Hunsrück Slate are commonly called "Bundenbach fossils" after the nearby German community of Bundenbach. More formally, the Hunsruck Slate is properly designated as a Konservat Lagerstätte due to the many fossils that exhibit preservation of soft tissues.

=== Preservation and taphonomy ===
Hunsrück is one of the few marine Devonian Lagerstätte having soft tissue preservation, and in many cases fossils are coated by a pyritic surface layer. Preservation of soft tissues as fossils normally requires rapid burial in an anoxic (i.e., with little or no oxygen) sedimentary layer where the decomposition of the organic matter is significantly slowed. The pyritization found in Bundenbach fossils facilitated preservation and enhanced the inherent beauty of the fossils.

Pyritization is rare in the fossil record, and is believed to require not only rapid burial, but both burial in sediments low in organic matter, and high in concentrations of sulfur and iron. Such pyritization is also prevalent in the lower Cambrian fossils from the Maotianshan shales of Chengjiang, China, the oldest Konservat Lagerstätte of Cambrian time.

The best localities for exceptionally preserved fossils are in the communities of Bundenbach and Gemünden. The slates were widely quarried in the past, mainly for roofing tiles from small pits, of which over 600 are known. Today, only a single quarry remains open in the main fossiliferous region of Bundenbach. There are also areas of the Hunsrück Slates where fossils are neither well preserved, nor pyritized, indicating that there also existed environments with shallow and fully oxygenated water.

=== Diversity of fauna ===
More than 260 animal species have been described from the Hunsrück Slate. The deposits occur in a strip some 15 km wide and 150 km long running from northwest to southeast. In the main depositional basins of Kaub, Bundenbach, and Gemünden, echinoderms are concentrated in the southwestern area around Bundenbach, with brachiopods predominating in the northeast. The presence of corals and trilobites with well-developed eyes and the rarity of plant fossils from the central basin areas suggest a shallow-water environment. Other animal fossils include sponges, corals, brachiopods, cephalopods, ctenophores, cnidarians, gastropods, and worm trace fossils. Trilobites and echinoderms are relatively abundant in some horizons. Crinoids and starfish are the predominant representatives of the echinoderms, although holothurians (sea cucumbers) are also represented. More than 60 species of crinoids are described from the Hunsrück Slate.

Many types of fishes have been described from the Hunsruck slate. Several genera of placoderm armoured fish have been recorded, including some preserved in three dimensions. Agnathan jawless fishes are the most commonly preserved vertebrates, particularly the flattened Drepanaspis, notable for its upwards-facing mouth, and the streamlined Pteraspis. Spines from acanthodii spiny sharks and a single sarcopterygian lobe-fin specimen are also known.

=== Paleobiota ===
Color key: Taxon / Reclassified taxon / Taxon falsely reported as present / Dubious taxon or junior synonym / Ichnotaxon / Ootaxon / Morphotaxon	Notes; Uncertain or tentative taxa are in small text; ~~crossed out~~ taxa are discredited.

==== Arthropods ====
===== Crustaceans =====
Crustaceans of the Hunsrück Slate.
Genus	Abundance	Notes	Images
Nahecaris		A phyllocarid crustacean	
Oryctocaris		A phyllocarid crustacean	
Ceratiocaris		A phyllocarid crustacean	
Heroldina		A phyllocarid crustacean	
Hohensteiniella		Early crustacean	

===== Eurypterids =====
Eurypterids of the Hunsrück Slate.
Genus	Abundance	Notes	Images
Jaekelopterus		A giant eurypterid, probably allochthonous	
Rhenopterus		Probably misidentified remains of trilobites	

===== Marrellomorphs =====
Marrellomorphs of the Hunsrück Slate.
Genus	Abundance	Notes	Images
Mimetaster	123 specimens	A marrellomorph, most common non-trilobite arthropod	
Vachonisia		A marrellomorph	

===== Sea spiders =====
Sea spiders of the Hunsrück Slate.
Genus	Abundance	Notes	Images
Flagellopantopus	1 specimen	A sea spider	
Palaeopantopus	3 specimens	A sea spider	
Palaeoisopus	Over 80 specimens	A sea spider, most common sea spider.	
Palaeothea	1 specimen (unlocatable)	A sea spider, potential nomen dubium	
Pentapantopus	3 specimens	A sea spider	

===== Trilobites =====
Trilobites of the Hunsrück Slate.
Genus	Abundance	Notes	Images
Chotecops		A trilobite, most common trilobite and arthropod	
Odontochile		A trilobite	
Cornuproetus		A trilobite	
Parahomalonotus		A trilobite	
Wenndorfia		A trilobite	
Rhenops		A trilobite	
"Asteropyge"		A trilobite	

===== Other Arthropods =====
Other arthropods of the Hunsrück Slate.
Genus	Abundance	Notes	Images
Bundenbachiellus		An arthropod of uncertain affinities	
Captopodus		Possible early mandibulate related to Acheronauta	
Cambronatus		An arthropod of uncertain affinities	
Magnoculocaris		An arthropod of uncertain affinities, originally named as Magnoculus	
Cheloniellon		A cheloniellid	
Palaeoscorpius		A primitive scorpion	
Schinderhannes	1 Specimen	A radiodont	
Weinbergina		A chelicerate	
Wingertshellicus		An arthropod of uncertain affinities	

==== Echinoderms ====
Echinoderms
Genus	Abundance	Notes	Images
Cheiropteraster		A brittle star	
Furcaster		A brittle star	
Loriolaster		A brittle star	
Taeniaster		A brittle star	
Bundenbachia		A brittle star	
Encrinaster		A brittle star	
Euzonosoma		A brittle star	
Lapworthura		A brittle star	
Mastigophiura		A brittle star	
Palaeophiomyxa		A brittle star	
Ophiurina		A brittle star	
Eospondylus		A brittle star	
Kentrospondylus		A brittle star	
Regulaecystis		A rhombiferan	
Echinasterella		A stenuroid	
Hystrigaster		A stenuroid	
Palasteriscus		A stenuroid	
Sturtzaster		A stenuroid	
Medusaster		A stenuroid	
Erinaceaster		A stenuroid	
Archasterina		A sea star	
Palaeosolaster		A sea star	
Palasterina		A sea star	
Helianthaster		A sea star	
Leioactis		A sea star	
Compsaster		A sea star	
Schlueteraster		A sea star	
Protasteracanthion		A sea star	
Kyraster		A sea star	
Baliactis		A sea star	
Urasterella		A sea star	
Hunsrueckaster		A sea star	
Palaeostella		A sea star	
Acanthocrinus		A crinoid	
Bactrocrinites		A crinoid	
Ctenocrinus		A crinoid	
Culicocrinus		A crinoid	
Diamenocrinus		A crinoid	
Orthocrinus		A crinoid	
Lasiocrinus		A crinoid	
Follicrinus		A crinoid	
Gissocrinus		A crinoid	
Propoteriocrinus		A crinoid	
Senariocrinus		A crinoid	
Iteacrinus		A crinoid	
Macarocrinus		A crinoid	
Pterinocrinus		A crinoid	
Hapalocrinus		A crinoid	
Thallocrinus		A crinoid	
Antihomocrinus		A crinoid	
Calycanthocrinus		A crinoid	
Codiacrinus		A crinoid	
Dicirrocrinus		A crinoid	
Dictenocrinus		A crinoid	
Gastrocrinus		A crinoid	
Imitatocrinus		A crinoid	
Parisangulocrinus		A crinoid	
Rhadinocrinus		A crinoid	
Rhenocrinus		A crinoid	
Triacrinus		A crinoid	
Eutaxocrinus		A crinoid	
Taxocrinus		A crinoid	
Rhenechinus		A echinoid	
Pentremitidea		A blastoid	
Schizotremites		A blastoid	
Mitrocystites (Dalejocystis)		A mitrate	
Rhenocystis		A mitrate	
Dehmicystis		A solute	
Pyrgocystis		A edrioasteroid	
Palaeocucumaria		A sea cucumber	

==== Annelids ====
Annelids
Genus	Abundance	Notes	Images
Bundenbachochaeta		A polychaete	
Crocancistrius		A polychaete	
Ewaldips		A polychaete	
Gilsonicaris		A eunicidan annelid, previously misidentified as a anostracan crustacean.	
Hunsrueckochaeta		A polychaete	
Lepidocoleus		A machaeridian	
Scopyrites		A polychaete	

==== Molluscs ====
Annelids
Genus	Abundance	Notes	Images
Anetoceras		An ammonoid cephalopod	
Ivoites		An ammonoid cephalopod	
Mimagoniatites		An ammonoid cephalopod	
Mimosphinctes		An ammonoid cephalopod	
Chebbites		An ammonoid cephalopod	
Praecardium		A bivalve	
Panenka		A bivalve	
Ctenodonta		A bivalve	
Cypricardella		A bivalve	
Ctenodonta		A bivalve	
?Puella		A bivalve	
Palaeozygopleura		A gastropod	
Bembexia		A gastropod	
Loxonema		A gastropod	
Platyceras		A gastropod	

==== Brachiopods ====
Brachiopods
Genus	Abundance	Notes	Images
Arduspirifer		A spiriferid brachiopod	
Euryspirifer		A spiriferid brachiopod	
Brachyspirifer		A spiriferid brachiopod	
Orbiculoidea			
Anoplotheca			
Atrypa			
Chonetes			
?Cryptonella			
Leptostrophia			
Loreleiella			
Meganteris			
Oligoptycherhynchus			
Platyorthis			
Plebejochonetes			
Tropidoleptus			

==== Vertebrates ====
Vertebrates
Genus	Abundance	Notes	Images
Stuertzaspis		A placoderm	
Tityosteus		A placoderm	
Stensioella		A placoderm	
Lunaspis		A placoderm	
Nessariostoma		A placoderm	
Drepanaspis		A pteraspidomorph jawless fish	
Rhinopteraspis		A pteraspidomorph jawless fish	
Paraplesiobatis		A placoderm	
Pseudopetalichthys		A placoderm	
Gemuendina		A placoderm	
Westollrhynchus		A lungfish	
Machaeracanthus		Acanthodian	

==== Other animals ====
Other animals
Genus	Abundance	Notes	Images
Archaeocydippida		A Ctenophore	
Paleoctenophora		A ctenophore	
Volgerophyllum		A rugose coral	
"Zaphrentis"		A rugose coral	
Favosites		A tabulate coral	
Pleurodictyum		A tabulate coral	
Palaeonectris		A hydrozoan	
Plectodiscus		A hydrozoan	
Hederella		A hederellid	
Conularia		A conulariid	
Sphenothallus		A conulariid	
Viriatellina		A tentaculitoid	
Nowakia		A tentaculitoid	
Styliolina		A tentaculitoid	
Tentaculites		A tentaculitoid	
"Protospongia" rhenana		A sponge	
Retifungus		A sponge	
Olkenbachia		A sponge	
Clionolithes		A sponge	

==== Ichnotaxon ====
Ichnotaxon
Genus	Abundance	Notes	Images
Chondrites		Ichnotaxon	
Planolites		Worm-like ichnotaxon	
Ctenopholeus		Ichnotaxon	
Heliochone		Ichnotaxon	
Protovirgularia		Ichnotaxon, including fossils originally misidentified as Edestus	
Pteridichnites		Ichnotaxon	
Endichnia		Ichnotaxon	

==== Plants ====
Flora
Genus	Abundance	Notes	Images
Drepanophycales indeterminate		A large lycophyte, washed into the basin from terrestrial sources, similar to Drepanophycus	
Psilophyton			
Trimerophyton			
Receptaculites			
Maucheria			

==== Incertae sedis ====
Fungi
Genus	Abundance	Notes	Images
Prototaxites		A macroscopic Eukaryote of unknown origin that grew in thick, tree-like trunks, washed in from terrestrial sources	

== See also ==
- List of fossil sites (with link directory)
