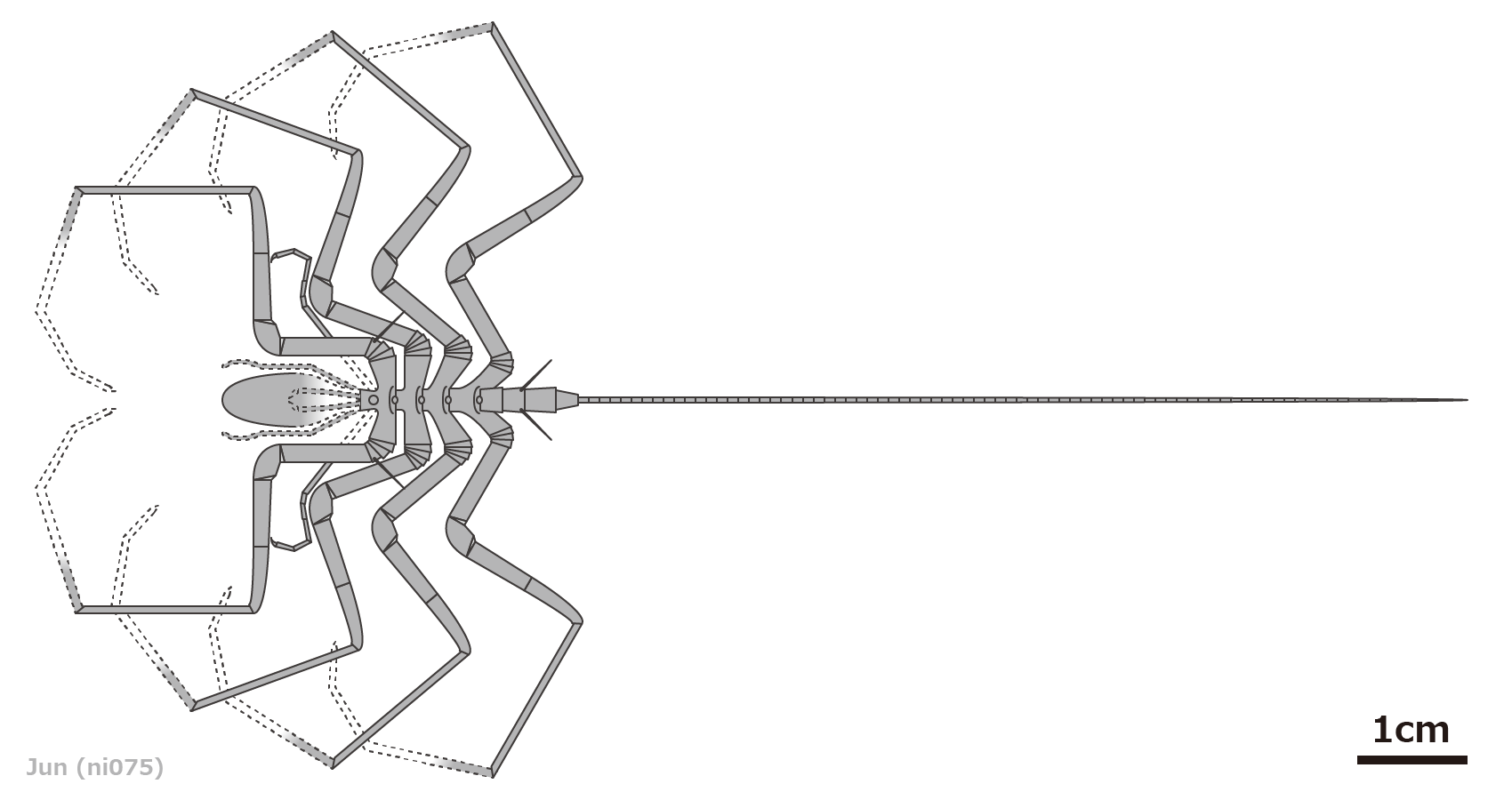
- Diagrammatic Reconstruction of F. blocki
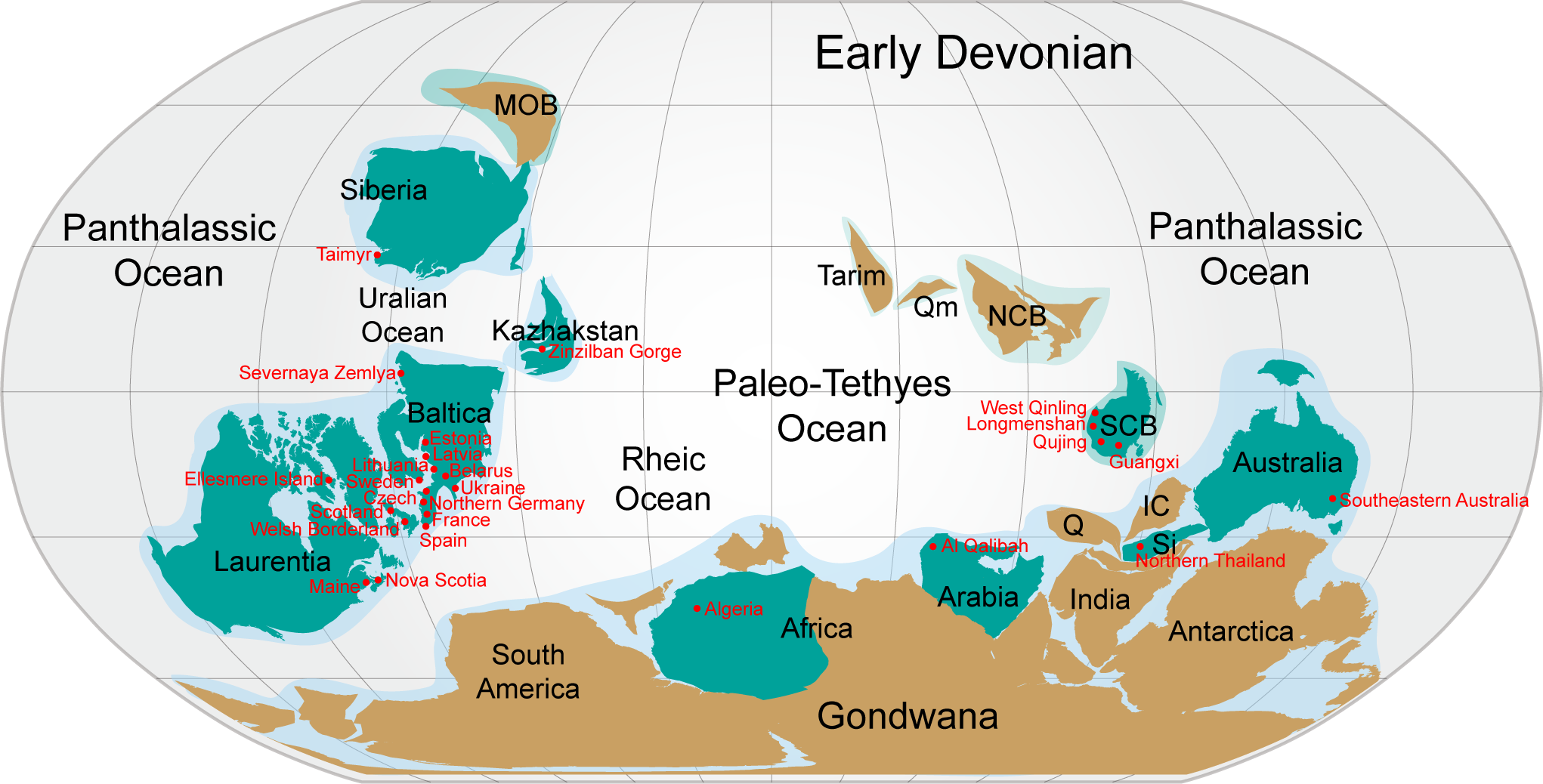
- World map of the lower Devonian (400 mya), roughly the same age as the Hunsrück Slate

Scientific classification
- Kingdom: Animalia
- Phylum: Arthropoda
- Subphylum: Chelicerata
- Class: Pycnogonida
- Genus: †Flagellopantopus; Poschmann & Dunlop, 2006
- Species: †F. blocki

Binomial name
- †Flagellopantopus blocki Poschmann & Dunlop, 2006

= Flagellopantopus =

Flagellopantopus Temporal range: Emsian

Extinct genus of sea spider

Flagellopantopus is an extinct genus of pycnogonid (sea spider) arthropod known from the lower Devonian aged Hunsrück Slate. A single species is currently known, Flagellopantopus blocki, which was described from the Emsian aged Kaub Formation in Germany.

F. blocki differs from other members of the Pycnogonida by possessing an extremely elongated telson, which was flagelliform in appearance. This animal was fairly large for a pycnogonid, with the whole body of the arthropod measuring around 26 mm (1.0 in) long, while the telson itself was around 66 mm (2.6 in) long. In its 2006 description, Poschmann and Dunlop placed Flagellopantopus into the order Pantopoda (which includes modern sea spiders). However, later publications have put doubt on this interpretation, and have suggested a new placement as a member of Pycnogonida incertae sedis. It is currently assumed to have lived a benthic lifestyle, as it lacks the flattened appendages and setae that pelagic species of pycnogonids typically have.

== Discovery and naming ==
The holotype (and only known) specimen of this pycnogonid, NHMMZ PWL 2004/5024-LS, was first described by Poschmann in 2004 for Project Nahecaris, (Note: Project Nahecaris, which was named after the phyllocarid crustacean Nahecaris, is an internationally funded program dedicated to studying the fauna and overall geologic significance of the Hunsrück Slate.) but was considered a nomen nudum due to the lack of a diagnosis. The specimen would later be given a proper diagnosis and description in 2006. The holotype specimen originates from the Kaub Formation, which is dated to the Emsian stage of the lower Devonian, but the exact locality of origin is uncertain. Poschmann and Dunlop (2006) state that the fossil was recovered from the Wingertshell Member, within the larger Obereschenbach quarry, near the municipality of Bundenbach. However, the administration housing the fossil, the Naturhistorisches Museum Mainz, states that the specimen originates from the Eschenbach-Bocksberg quarry.

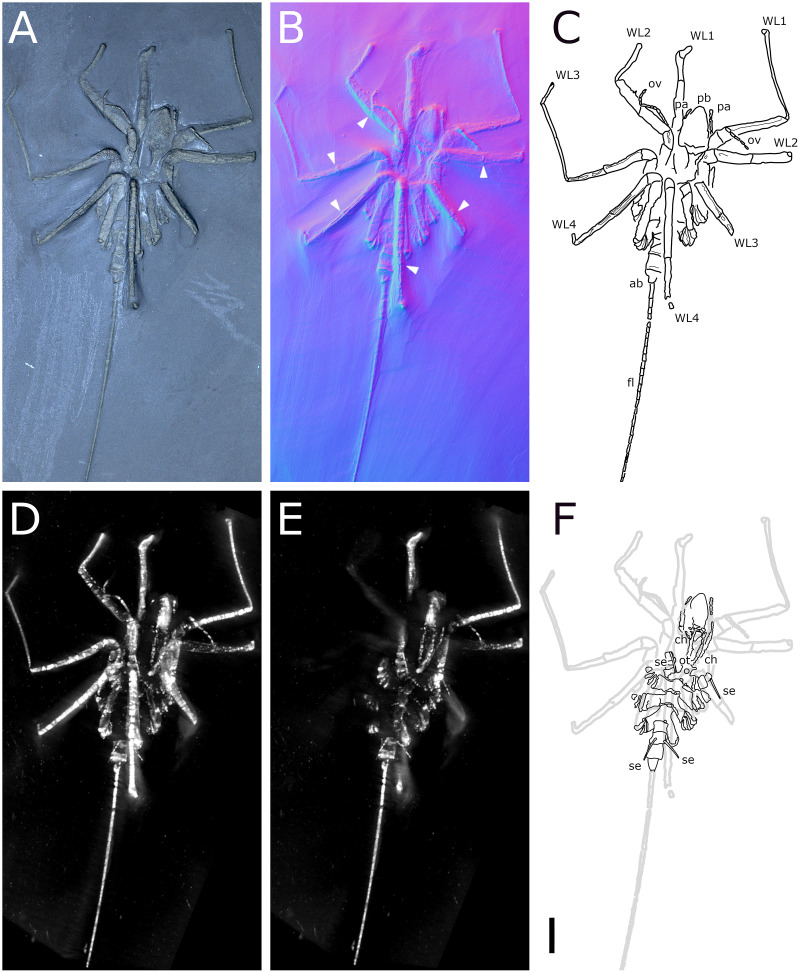
NHMMZ PWL 2004/5024-LS imaged using both normal, and x-ray visualization

The arthropod's genus name, Flagellopantopus, is derived from the Latin word flagella, meaning "whip", which was named after the elongated telson possessed by the genus, and the pycnogonid order Pantopoda, which is derived from the Latin words pant and poda, meaning "all feet". The specific name, blocki, is in honour of Helmut Block, who donated the holotype for public viewing and research.

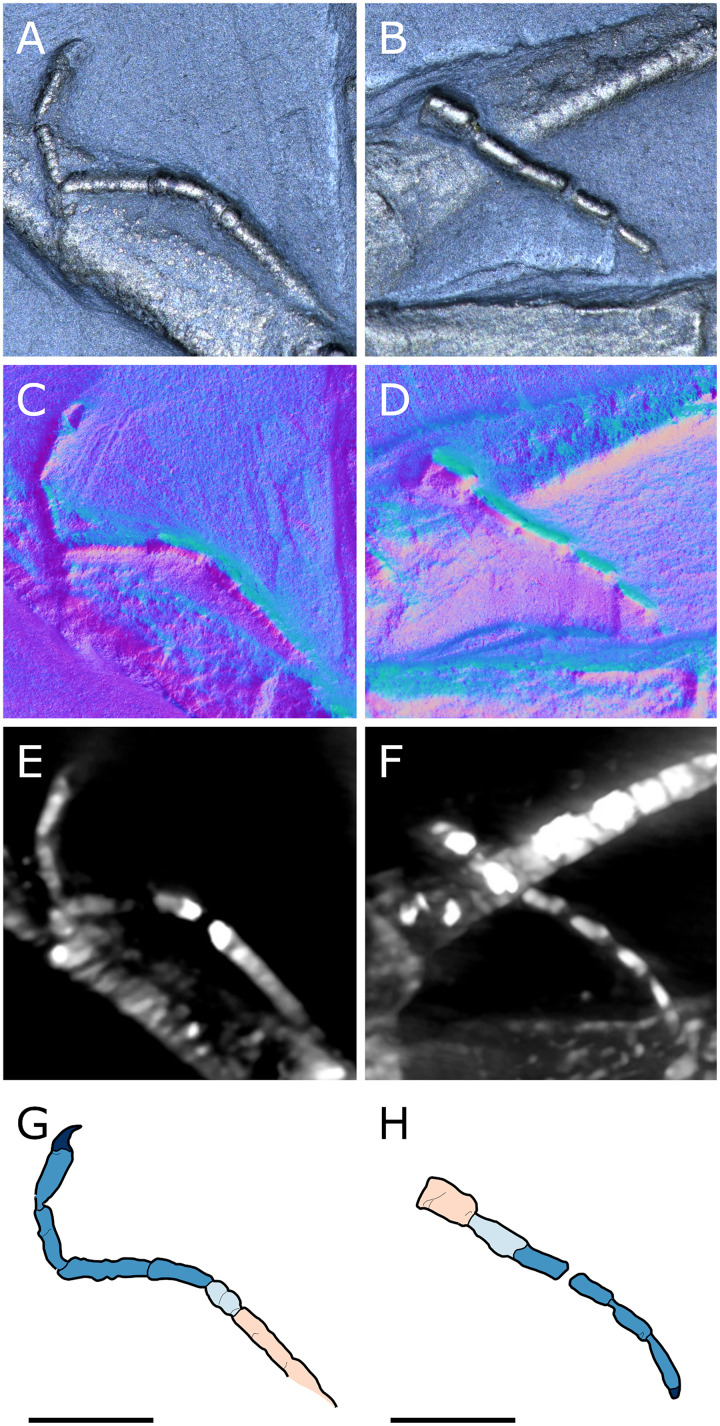
Ovigers of the holotype specimen under normal and x-ray visualization

== Description ==
Flagellopantopus was relatively large compared to most other pycnogonids, with the main body (excluding telson) of the arthropod measuring around 26 mm (1.0 in) long. There are 5 dorsal tubercles located across the cephalon and trunk segments, with the first one represent ocular tubercle. By far the most distinguishing trait of this taxon was its extremely elongated telson (flagella), which measured around 66 mm (2.6 in) long, nearly three times longer than the arthropods main body. The telson was preceded by a 4-segmented abdomen, which possess a pair of long projections at the second abdominal segment.

Like most other pycnogonids, this genus possessed four pairs of walking legs that had at least a 90 mm (3.5 in) arm-span. Each leg possess an annulated coxa 1 and immobile junction between segment 4-5 similar to Palaeopantopus, while the distal regions (tibia and tarsal region) are not preserved. Coxa 1 of the first leg pair possess a long projection.

All 3 pairs of cephalic appendages (chelifores, palps, ovigers) are evident, but most of the details are obscured by their poor preservation. Distal region of the oviger showing 6 segments (possibly patella, tibia, and 4 tarsal segments) and a terminal claw.

The proboscis of this taxon is partially obscured, and how it connected to the rest of the cephalic region is uncertain. The proboscis itself had a pyriform appearance and was roughly 6 mm (0.24 in) long, and had a width of around 4 mm (0.16 in) wide.

== Classification ==
Although they are often colloquially known as "sea spiders", pycnogonids are not closely related to them and other arachnids. However, their placement as basal members of the Chelicerata subphylum means that they are more closely related to them then to other groups. Flagellopantopus is confidently classified within the Pycnogonida, however its further placement is uncertain. Both Poschmann (2004) and Poschmann and Dunlop (2006) placed this taxon as a relatively basal member of the Pantopoda order (which includes all crown-group sea spiders) on the basis of its long telson, which is lost in more derived taxa. However, they classified this taxon as more derived than another contemporary pycnogonid, Palaeoisopus problematicus, due to Flagellopantopus possessing a less well developed abdomen, which is a derived trait in crown-group pycnogonids. However, later studies, including Sabroux et al. (2024) have suggested that not only was Flagellopantopus not a member of Pantopoda, but the entire order did not exist during the Devonian. They instead classified this taxon, and the other known Hunsrück pycnogonids into two different morphological groups separate from the Pantopoda.

== Paleoecology ==
The Hunsrück Slate is deposited within the regions of Hunsrück and Taunus within the country of Germany. Although debates still stand about the exact depth of the ecosystem during the Devonian, most recent studies have suggested a maximum depth of around 100 m (330 ft) deep, within the Epipelagic zone. Due to the fact that Flagellopantopus possessed chelifores, it is likely that it was not restricted to feeding on sessile organisms, which is common in modern representatives. It is also likely that it lived a fully benthic lifestyle, as it lacks the broad legs and long setae usually associated with swimming pycnogonids. The telson of this taxon most likely would've acted as a sensory structure, as it was probably too stiff to help with locomotion in the water column.

A plethora of other organisms are known to lived alongside Flagellopantopus, including other arthropods, echinoderms, placoderms, agnathans, and various other groups. Some notable examples of contemporary genera include the peytoiid radiodont Schinderhannes bartelsi, the marrellomorphid arthropods Mimetaster hexagonalis and Vachonisia rogeri, as well as the various placoderms of the bizarre Pseudopetalichthyida order (which are only found at Hunsrück). Also found in the area are various other pycnogonids, including Palaeopantopus maucheri, Pentapantopus vogteli, Palaeothea devonica, and the aforementioned Palaeoisopus problematicus. The level of pycnogonid genera found at the Hunsrück Slate makes it the most diverse assemblage of fossil pycnogonids yet discovered.
