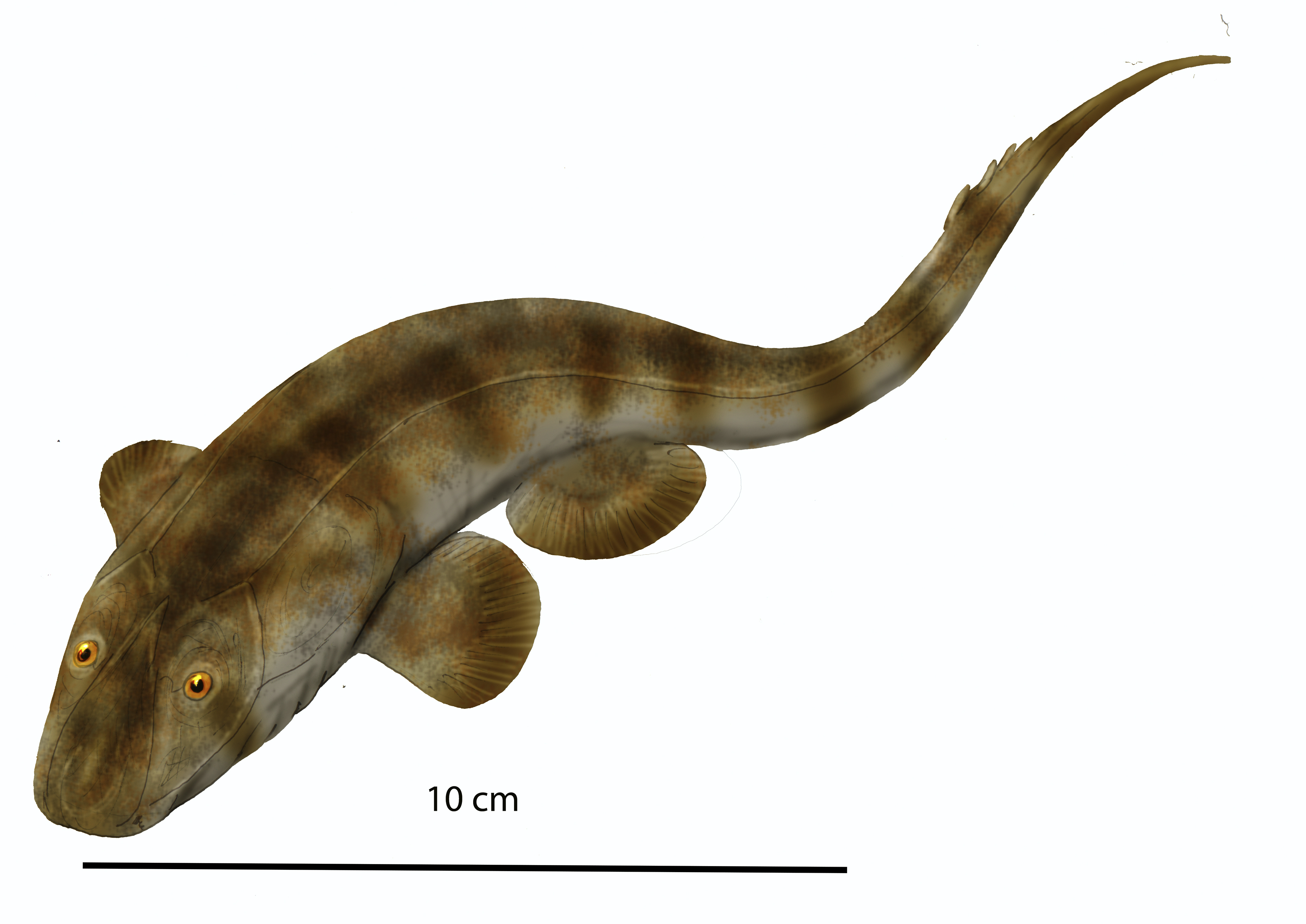
- Artist's reconstruction

Scientific classification
- Kingdom: Animalia
- Phylum: Chordata
- Class: Placodermi
- Order: Pseudopetalichthyida
- Family: Paraplesiobatidae
- Genus: Pseudopetalichthys Moy-Thomas, 1939
- Species: P. problematica

Binomial name
- Pseudopetalichthys problematica Moy-Thomas, 1939

Synonyms
- Parapetalichthys Kuhn, 1949

= Pseudopetalichthys =

Pseudopetalichthys Temporal range: Emsian

Extinct genus of fishes

Pseudopetalichthys problematica is a lightly armored pseudopetalichthyid placoderm from the Hunsrückschiefer Lagerstätte of Early Devonian Germany. The holotype and only known specimen is an articulated, but incomplete individual consisting of a large, mostly intact, plate-covered head, the bases of the pectoral fins, and most of the vertebral column, with a total length of 15 centimetres (6 in). The specimen superficially resembles Stensioella, though the structures of the mouth, and orbits (the orbits being unknown in Stensioella), and placement of the gill rakers all differ.

Some experts suggest that P. problematica and the related Paraplesiobatis are the same species, suggesting that the differences between them are merely due to different circumstances of taphonomy, but this hypothesis can not be tested until more specimens are found.

The holotype was originally held in the Schlosspark Museum in Bad Kreuznach, but was then lost at an unknown date.
