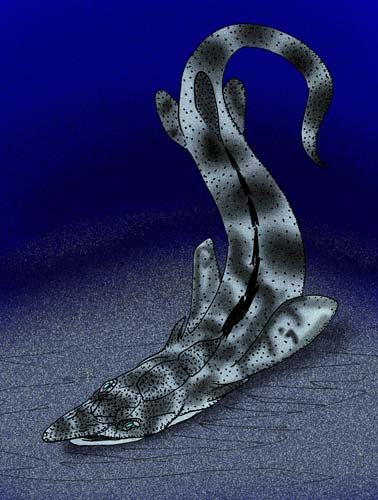
- Artist's reconstruction

Scientific classification
- Kingdom: Animalia
- Phylum: Chordata
- Class: Placodermi
- Order: Pseudopetalichthyida
- Family: Paraplesiobatidae
- Genus: Nessariostoma Broili, 1933
- Species: N. granulosum

Binomial name
- Nessariostoma granulosum Broili, 1933

= Nessariostoma =

Nessariostoma Temporal range: Emsian

Nessariostoma granulosum is a lightly armored pseudopetalichthyid placoderm from the Hunsrückschiefer Lagerstätte of Early Devonian Germany. The type and only known specimen is an articulated, but very incomplete individual, deformed and elongated, consisting of a large, incomplete, tubercle-covered head, a long, beak-like rostrum, and some of the trunk, with a total length of 18 centimeters. N. granulosum was once placed in Stensioellida, though most other experts regard it at as a pseudopetalichthyid: Denison 1978 regards it as a placoderm incertae sedis because the specimen is deformed and so poorly preserved so as to stymie proper attempts at classification.
