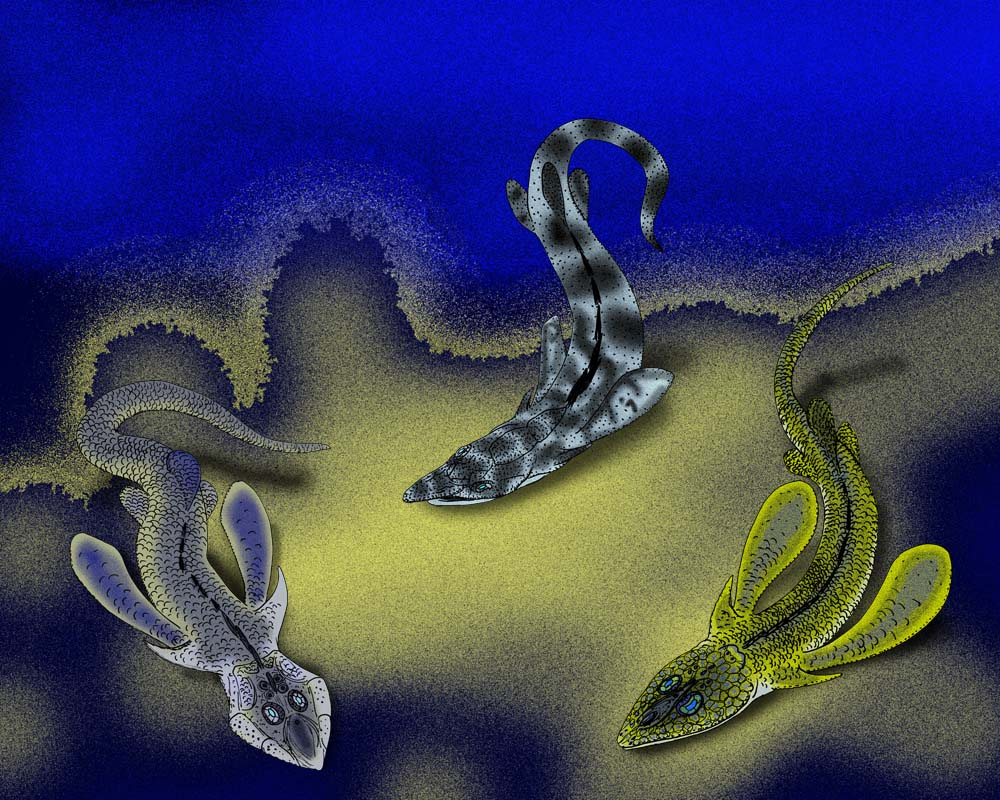
- Artist's reconstructions

Scientific classification
- Kingdom: Animalia
- Phylum: Chordata
- Class: †Placodermi
- Order: †Pseudopetalichthyida; Denison, 1975
- Family: †Paraplesiobatidae; Berg, 1940

Species
- Pseudopetalichthys problematica†; Paraplesiobatis heinrichsi †; Nessariostoma granulosa †

= Pseudopetalichthyida =

Pseudopetalichthyida Temporal range: Emsian

Pseudopetalichthyida is an order of lightly armored placoderms known only from rare fossils in Lower Devonian strata in Hunsrück, Germany. Like Stensioella heintzi, and the Rhenanida, the Pseudopetalichthids had armor made up of a mosaic of tubercles. Like Stensioella heintzi, the Pseudopetalichthids' placement within Placodermi is suspect. However, due to a gross lack of whole, uncrushed, articulated specimens, there are no other groups that the Pseudopetalichthids could be, for a lack of a better word, pigeonholed into.

On the other hand, according to anatomical studies done on the crushed specimens that have been found, those experts who do regard the Pseudopetalichthyida as placoderms consider them to be a group more advanced than the Ptyctodonts. And as such, pro-placoderm experts consider Pseudopetalichthyida to be the sister group of the Arthrodires + Phyllolepida + Antiarchi trichotomy and the Acanthothoraci + Rhenanida dichotomy.

The best known species is the type species Pseudopetalicthys problematica. Some experts have suggested that Paraplesiobatis heinrichsi is the same species as P. problematica, but, due to the specimens of the latter species being crushed in a different position than the specimen of the former species, the anatomies of the two forms appear different (Moy-Thomas & Miles). However, this problem will be resolved only with more specimens. The anatomy of the specimens of Nessariostoma granulosum are sufficiently different from the other two pseudopetalichthyids to be recognized as a separate species. N. granulosum bears a superficial resemblance to Stensioella heintzi, and it was this resemblance that originally led to the pseudopetalichthyids' grouping within Stensioellidae.
