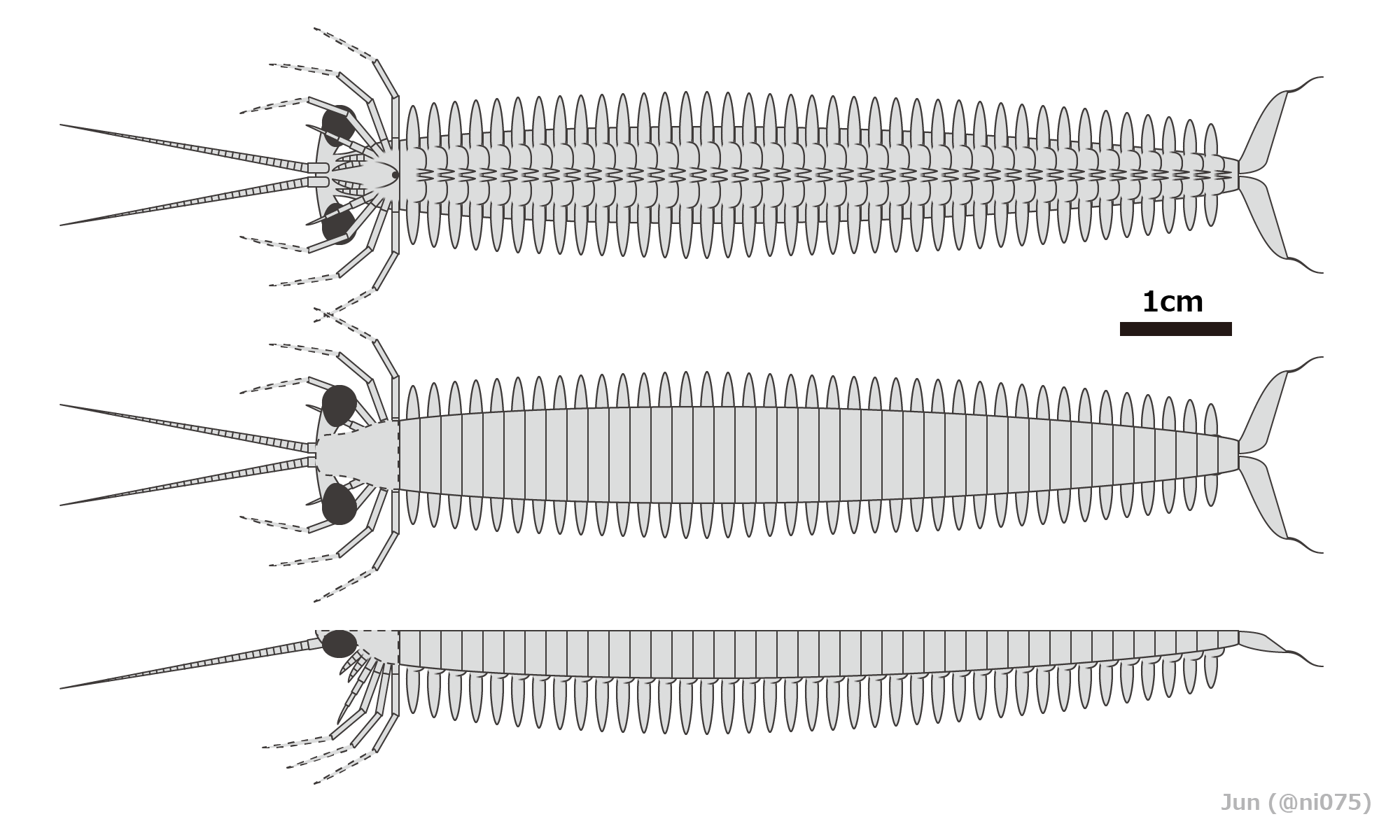
- Diagrammatic reconstruction of Wingertshellicus backesi

Scientific classification
- Kingdom: Animalia
- Phylum: Arthropoda
- (unranked): Deuteropoda
- Genus: †Wingertshellicus; Briggs & Bartles, 2001
- Species: †W. backesi

Binomial name
- †Wingertshellicus backesi Brigs & Bartles, 2001

Synonyms
- Devonohexapodus bocksbergensis Haas, Waloszek & Hartenberger, 2003

= Wingertshellicus =

Wingertshellicus Temporal range: Lower Devonian (Lower Emsian)

Extinct genus of arthropods

Wingertshellicus is an extinct genus of arthropod that has been found in Hunsrück Slate, that is located in the Rhenish Massif in Germany, and lived about 405 million years ago, during the Lower Emsian (part of the Lower Devonian).

== Etymology ==
Wingertshellicus has been named after the Wingertshell Member, part of the Hunsrück Slate near the German town of Bundenbach, in which it was found.

== Morphology ==
Wingertshellicus measured about 7.5 centimetres or 3.0 inches long. The body of consists of just two main parts (tagmata): a short head and an elongated trunk.

The head possess a pair of large stalked compound eyes and 7 pairs of appendages. The first appendages are long, annulated antennae. Within the remaining 6 pairs of leg-like appendages, the anterior 2 pairs are short and stout while the posterior 3 pairs were significantly elongated. The segmentation of the post-antennular appendages obscured by their limited preservation. A ventral triangular projection with terminal mouth opening located between the posterior appendages. There is no complex mouthparts (e.g. mandible; labium) nor subdivision of a thorax for the 6 elongated appendages like those of an insect.

The trunk comprises about 40 similar segments (somites), each carried a pair of biramous appendages, a trait of deuteropod arthropods, with enlarged basipod (basal segment), flap-like exopods (outer branch) and slender endopods (inner branch). The appendages were subequal, lacking any evidence of specializations. the trunk terminated by a pair of fluke-like appendages with flagellate structures.

== Taxonomy ==
Wingertshellicus backesi was originally described in 2001 from specimens that were exposed on their belly (or ventrally), and was tentatively identified as a crustaceanomorph at that time. Two years later, Devonohexapodus bocksbergensis was erected based on a specimen on its side (or laterally) from the same stratum. At first sight, it seems that the ventrally exposed specimens only have small and slender appendages, while the laterally exposed has three pairs of long and stout legs, hence the description of the latter as a new species of hexapod (a subphylum of arthropod compose of insects and close-related taxa). The lateral specimen were interpreted as a marine stem-hexapod originated just before the split of entognathan and true insect (Ectognatha) lineages, suggest the origin of the definitive six-legged thorax evolved before the terrestrialization of hexapod ancestors. The initial diagnoses of the lateral specimen, particularly the three pairs of legs, seemed to substantiate tentative finds based on genetic and ontogenetic studies that insects have a different crustacean ancestry than other land arthropods such as spiders and centipedes.

However, detailed redescription in 2009 showed that the vertrally and laterally exposed specimen share the same tagmosis (only head and trunk), long and slender antennas, two large eyes on stalks, the same number, make up and attachment of the head appendages, the same number of segments in the abdomen, small abdominal appendages and two tail flukes at the rear. In the Hunsrück Slate soft parts are preserved in pyrite and may represent the infill of the original cuticle. In other species the thickness of the appendages turns out to be highly variable dependent upon the orientation with respect to the bedding plain. So the apparent differences in the thickness of the appendages occurred between the ventral and lateral specimens does not necessarily indicate taxonomic difference. As the result, Devonohexapodus turns out to be a synonym of Wingertshellicus, the validity as an indication for early hexapod evolution by the lateral specimen was eventually flawed, since the 6 legs were revealed to be cephalic instead of thoraxic, and other supposed hexapod like-characters (e.g. posterior gonopods, cerci) turns out to be either mis- or overinterpretation as well. Due to the lack of mandibles and other taxonomic definitive characters, Wingertshellicus is not even assignable to Mandibulata (a clade composed of myriapods, crustaceans and hexapods) nor any known arthropod subgroups.
