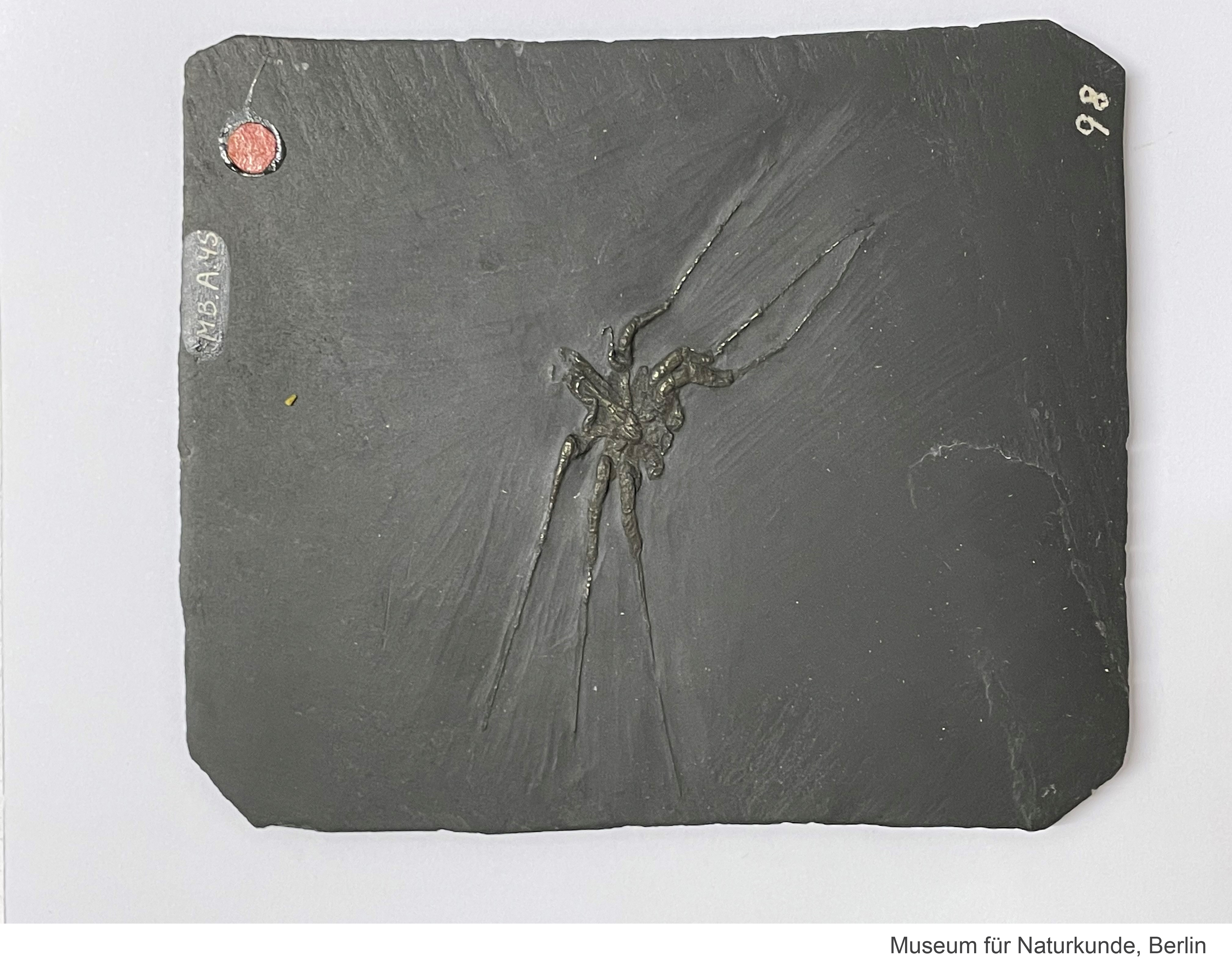
- Fossil of Palaeopantopus maucheri

Scientific classification
- Kingdom: Animalia
- Phylum: Arthropoda
- Subphylum: Chelicerata
- Class: Pycnogonida
- Genus: †Palaeopantopus; Broili, 1929
- Species: †P. maucheri

Binomial name
- †Palaeopantopus maucheri Broili, 1929

= Palaeopantopus =

Palaeopantopus Temporal range: Emsian

Extinct genus of sea spider

Palaeopantopus is a monotypic genus of fossil pycnogonid (sea spider), known only by one species, Palaeopantopus maucheri from the Devonian Hunsrück Slate of Germany.

== Description ==
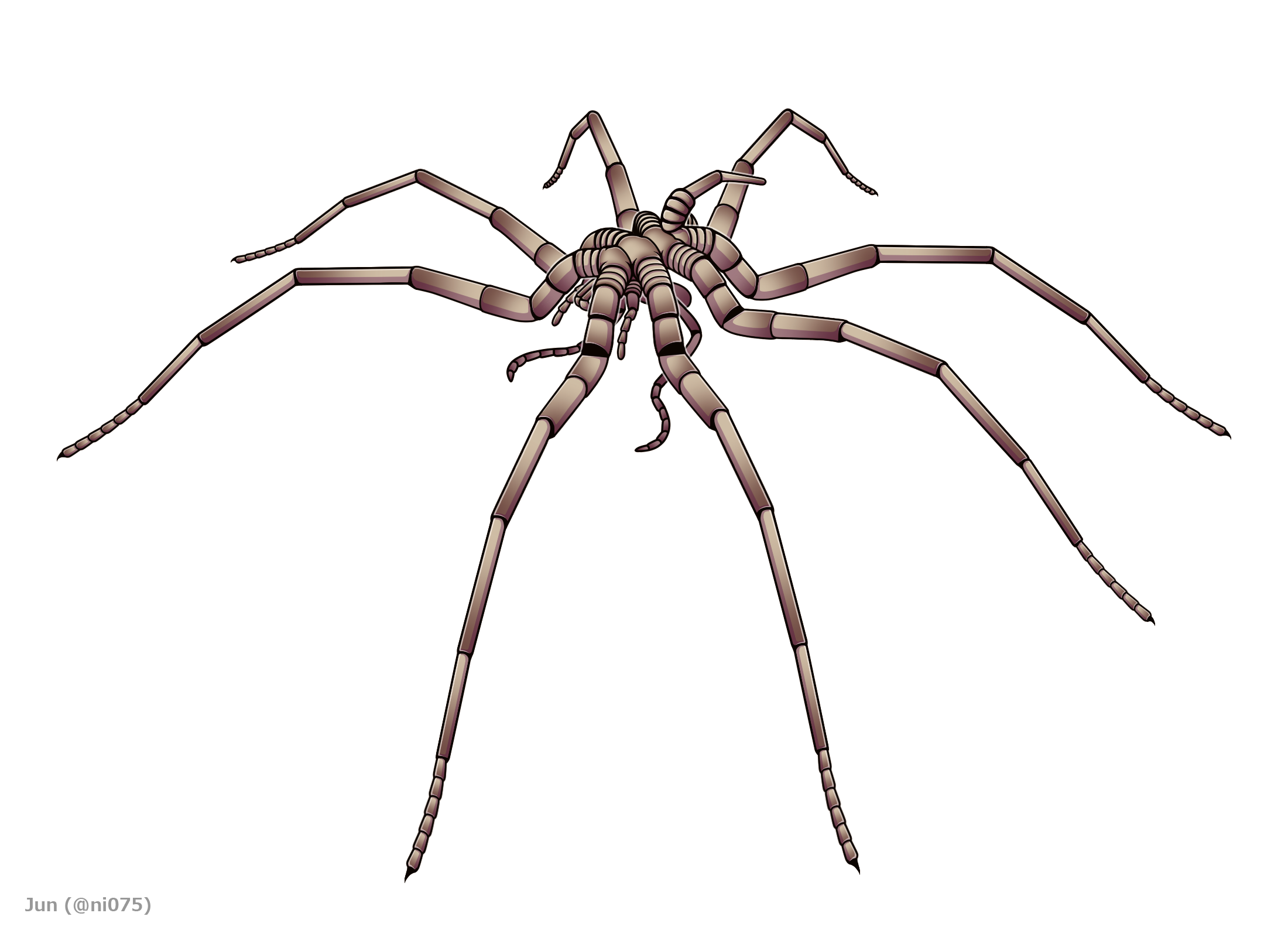
Reconstruction

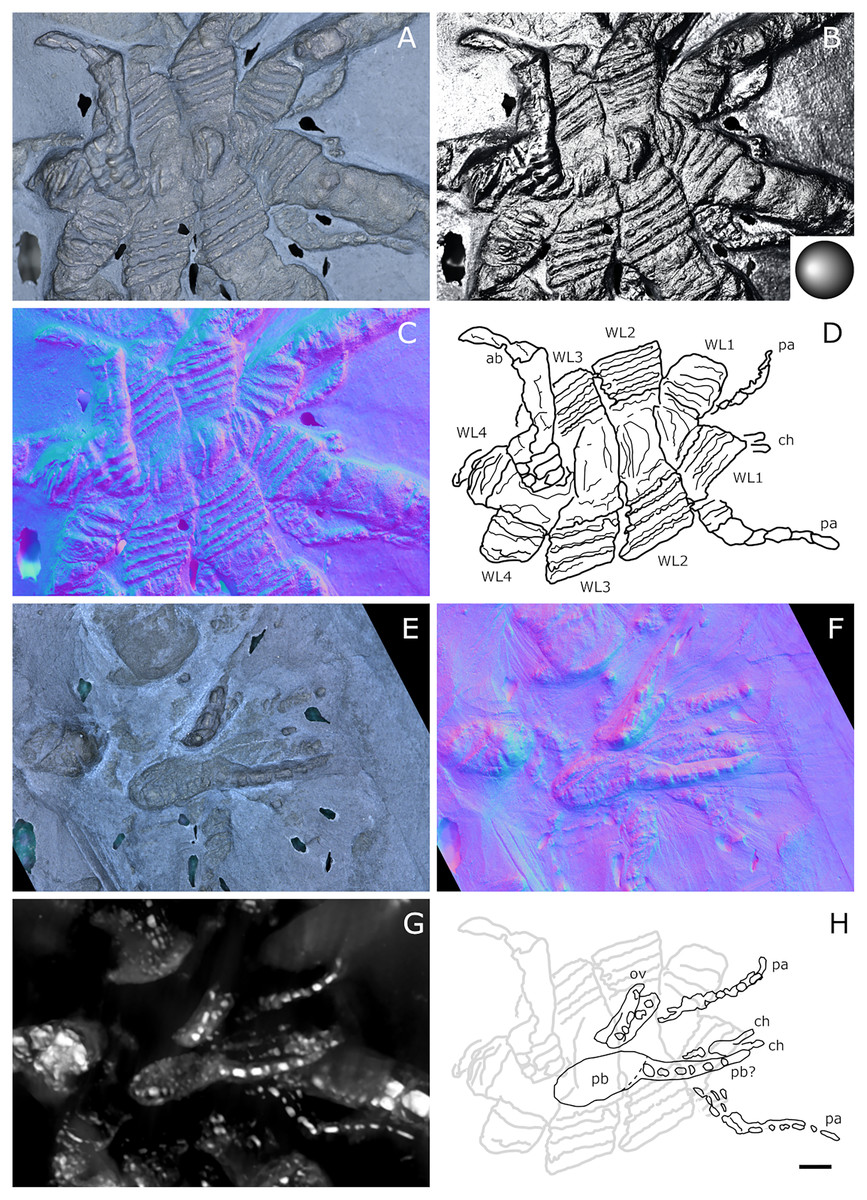
Details of body and underlying cephalic structures

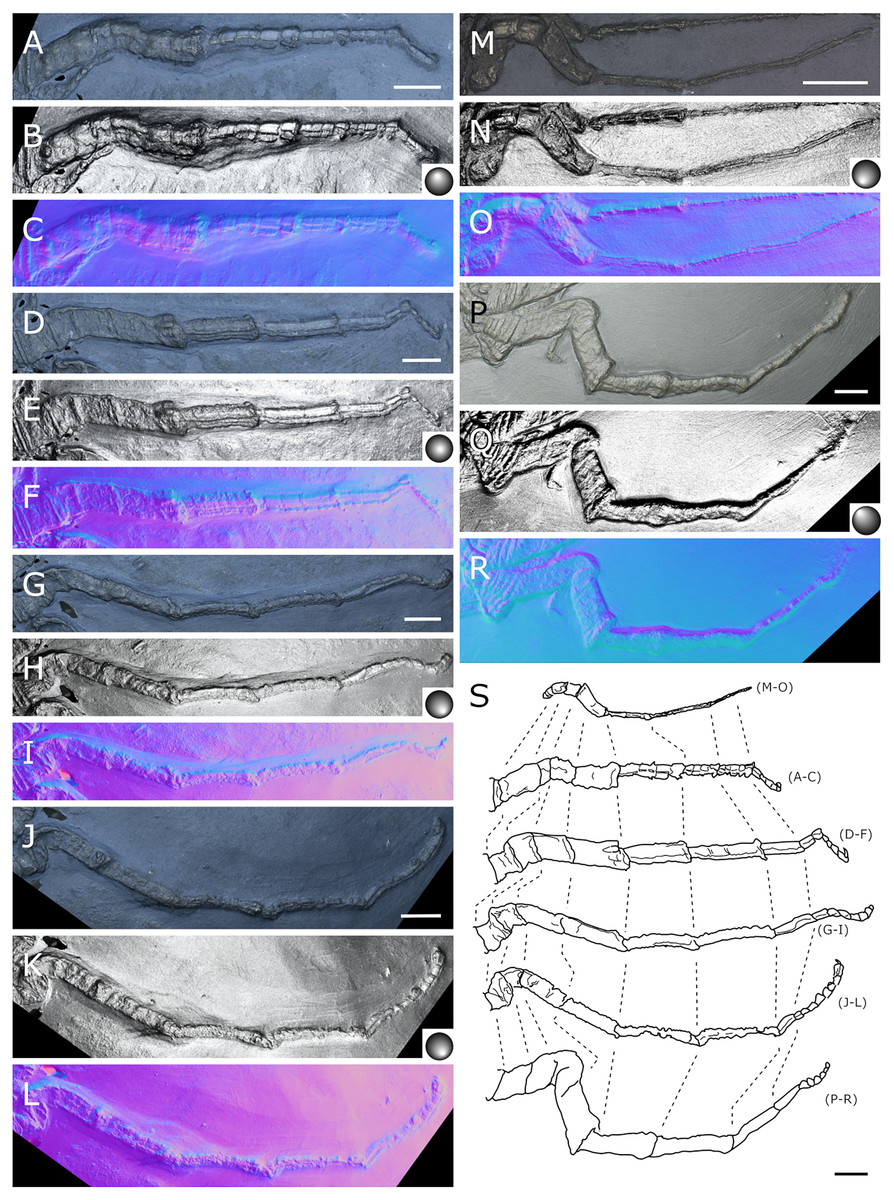
Details of legs

Palaeopantopus is known from 3 specimens, one of which is slightly smaller and may represent a different sex or earlier life stage. The body measured up to 1.5 cm with a leg span of about 14 cm. The genus is characterized by a "headless" appearance, as there is no sign of cephalon (except the posteriormost segment carrying the first walking legs, which is usually considered part of pycnogonid cephalon but alternatively counted as trunk segment by some studies) from any fossils, although cephalic organs such as proboscis and 3 pairs of cephalic appendages are still present underneath the trunk.

The proboscis is piriform and extends posteriorly, with an unusual elongate structure in front of it which may either be an oviger (with the proboscis folded under the body) or the continuation of the proboscis (in which case it would originate very posteriorly, between the third walking legs). All Cephalic appendages are poorly preserved and their exact number of segments (podomeres) are uncertain. The chelifores seem to have no pincer, the clawless palps seems to have annulated base similar to the walking legs. The ovigers have at least 2 long segments (counted up to 7 by Bergström et al. (1980)) and end in a claw.

The body is broad and surrounded by 4 pairs of short lateral processes (basal joints of walking legs). The abdomen is dorsal to the final trunk segment, it contains six elements represented by 4 annulations and 2 longer sections, with possible trace of gut suggest a terminal anus. However, the pyritization used to claim this is also found in the ovigers and palps (which never have gut diverticula in pycnogonids), therefore it likely does not represent the true extent of the gut, and the anus may not be terminal after all if the distalmost section is a telson (post-anal tail).

Just like most Paleozoic pycnogonids, the 4 pairs of walking legs have annular structures at their base which likely represent the first segment (coxa 1), although Bergström et al. (1980) suggested they were lateral processes instead. The first two segments (coxa 2–3) after this are relatively short, with increasing length in proportion to width down to the seventh podomere. Similar to Flagellopantopus, The apparently fourth and fifth segment was divided by an immobile joint, which might suggest the whole section is a subdivided femur (original fourth segment). After this, distal segments are relatively hard to discern due to fragmentation, although at least two are recorded, with four more recorded from a hook-like structure at the tip (although the boundaries of the "segments" in this region may be taphonomic artifacts), which itself may be tipped with a claw.
