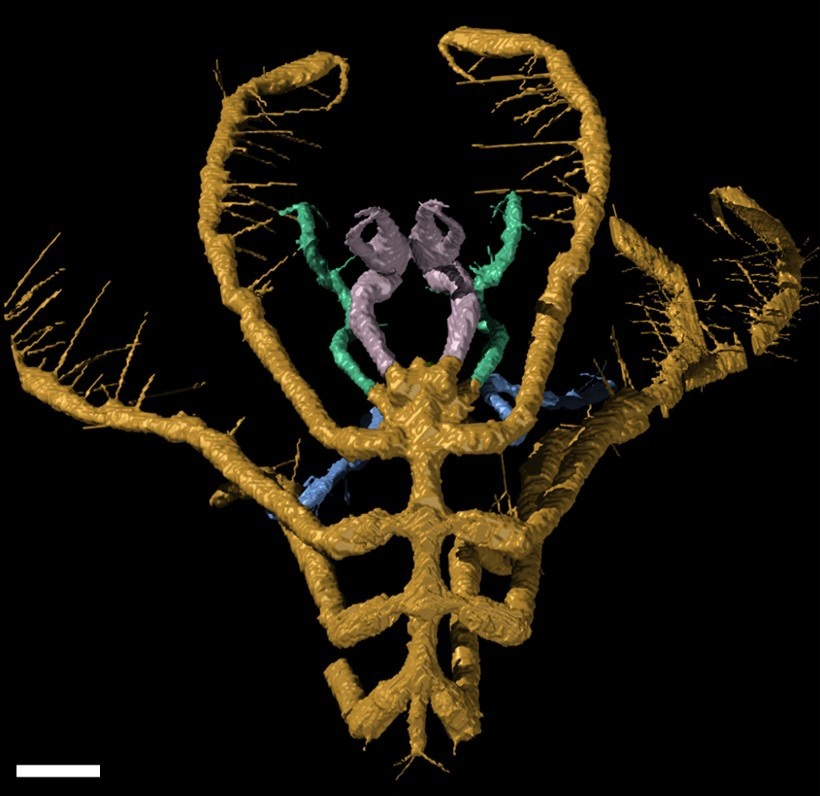
- 3D reconstruction of the fossil specimen

Scientific classification
- Kingdom: Animalia
- Phylum: Arthropoda
- Subphylum: Chelicerata
- Class: Pycnogonida
- Order: †Nectopantopoda; Bamber, 2007
- Family: †Haliestidae; Bamber, 2007
- Genus: †Haliestes; Siveter et al. 2004
- Species: †H. dasos

Binomial name
- †Haliestes dasos Siveter et al. 2004

= Haliestes =

Haliestes Temporal range: Silurian

Extinct genus of sea spiders

Haliestes is a genus of sea spider (pycnogonid) from the Silurian aged Coalbrookdale Formation of England. It contains a single species, Haliestes dasos. The species was first described by David Siveter et al. in 2004.

== Morphology ==
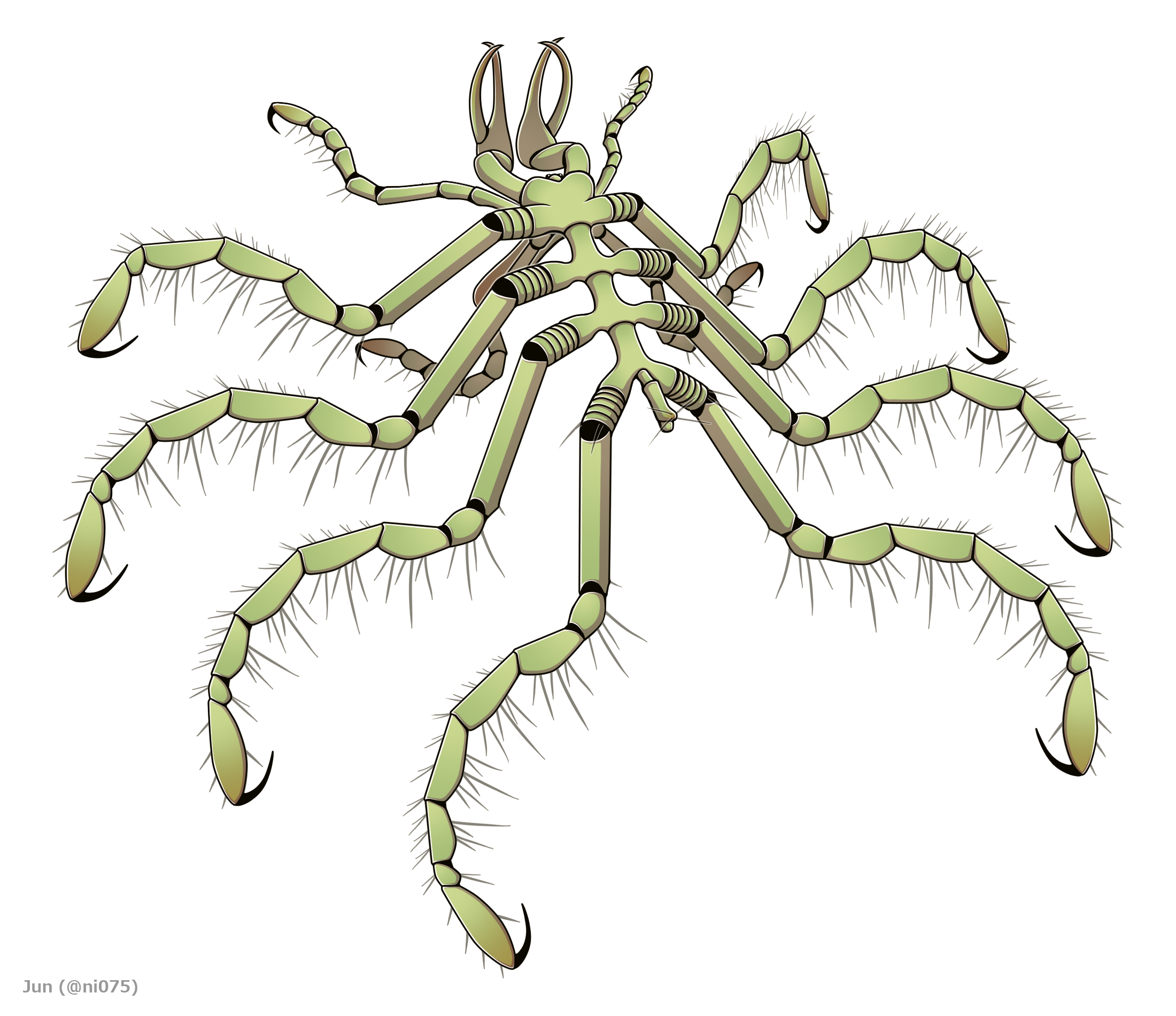
Reconstruction

Haliestes is a tiny sea spider measured only up to 5.7 mm in body length. Ocular tubercle is evident at the front, but it is unknown if it bore eyes or not. The tubular proboscis facing ventrally below its cephalon. The trunk segments are narrowed. The reduced abdomen was divided by 3 tiny segments.

All appendages are well developed. The chelifores featured a robust, upward-facing pincer, connected to the front by a 2-segmented scape. The palps and ovigers are subequal to each other, each possess 9 segments and a hooked terminal claw. The 8 legs are over twice of its body length, sharing some traits with the younger Hunsrück pycnogonids (e.g. Palaeoisopus, Pentapantopus) such as annulated coxa 1, paddle-like segments lined with long setae and hooked, robust terminal claw. The first leg pair have less annulations (3) and segments (8) than the other leg pairs (5 annulations and 9 total segment count).

== Paleoecology ==
Haliestes is considered to be a nektonic predator, swimming by using its legs and hunting with its cephalic appendages.
