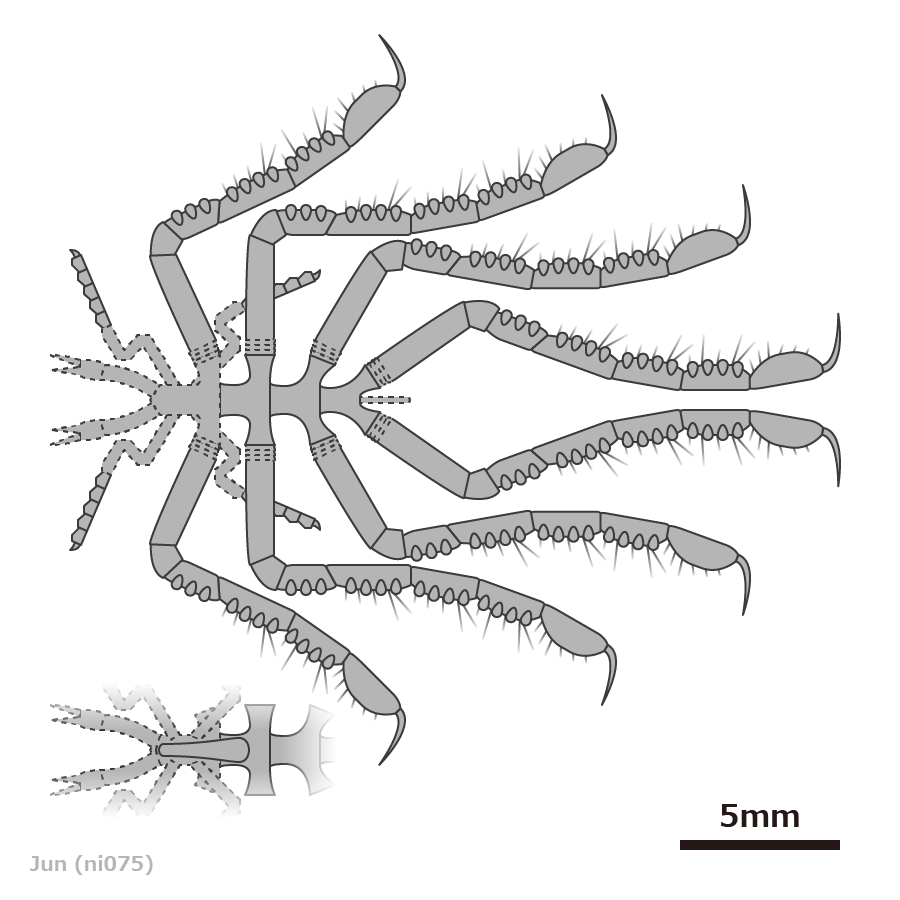
- Diagrammatic reconstruction of Pentapantopus vogteli

Scientific classification
- Kingdom: Animalia
- Phylum: Arthropoda
- Subphylum: Chelicerata
- Class: Pycnogonida
- Genus: †Pentapantopus; Kühl, Poschmann and Rust, 2013
- Species: †P. vogteli

Binomial name
- †Pentapantopus vogteli Kühl, Poschmann and Rust, 2013

= Pentapantopus =

Pentapantopus Temporal range: Emsian

Extinct genus of sea spider

Pentapantopus is a genus of fossil pycnogonid (sea spider). The only known species is Pentapantopus vogteli from the Hunsrück Slate of Germany. This sea spider was thought to have had five pairs of legs; however, a 2024 study disproved this. It is recognizable by its flattened, tuberculated legs with the first pair having less segments than other sea spiders.

== Description ==
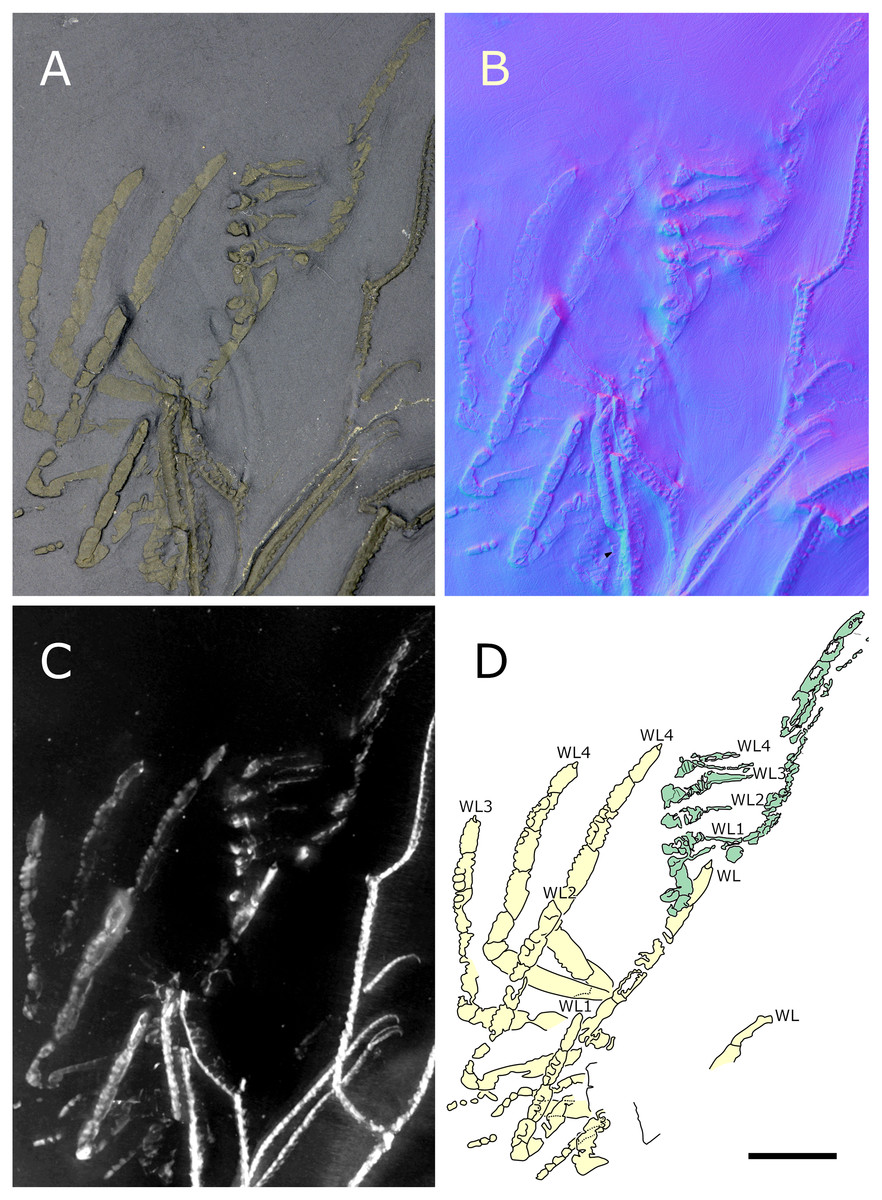
Holotype and paratype, showing 5 legs in a row led to the previous 10-legged interpretation.

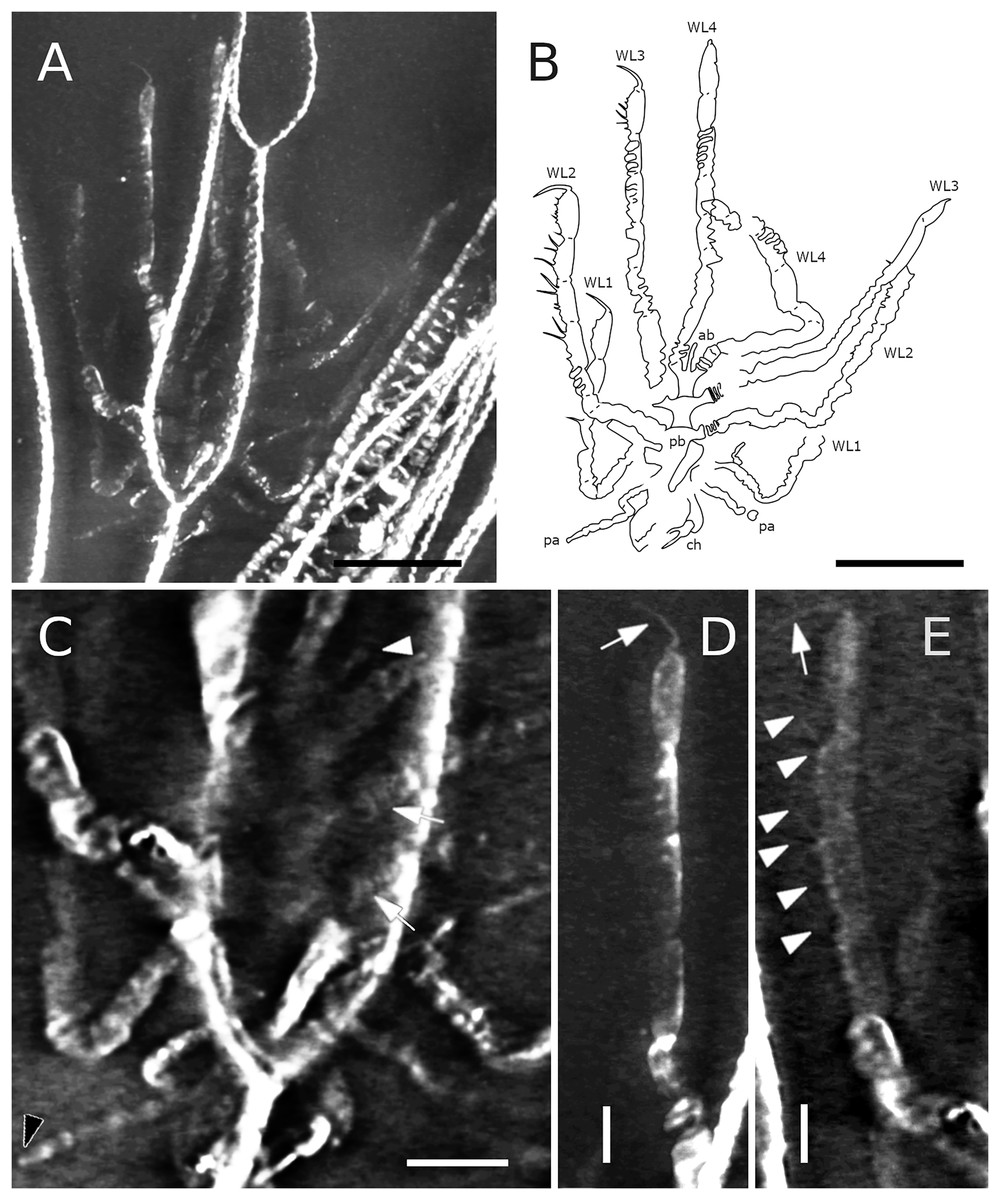
New specimen with more details preserved

Pentapantopus is a relatively small pycnogonid with a measured body length of up to 1.2 cm. It somewhat resembles the Silurian Haliestes, which was used to infer various details that are not well-preserved (e.g. cephalon, palps, ovigers, leg annulations, abdomen) on the former's redescription in 2024.

The cephalon is poorly preserved. The narrowed trunk has lateral processes measured as long as wide. The segmentation of the reduced abdomen is unclear, but it might have had 3 segments based on Haliestes. The proboscis was folded underneath its body, which might reflect its mobility. The chelifores have at least 3 segments (podomere): a 2-segmented pincer and an unsegmented scape, although the original description identified a 2-segmented scape. The palps and ovigers have poorly preserved segmentation, although the former may have a terminal claw.

When Pentapantopus was first described in 2013, it was thought to be a polymerous (extra-legged) species that had 5 pairs of legs (hence the name). However, with the description of another specimen in 2024, this has been refuted in favour of the common arrangement of 4 pairs of legs, as the previous "fifth leg" in the incomplete specimen was likely a misinterpretation of the opposite fourth leg. Each leg begins with a possibly annulated coxa and ends with a long, hook-like terminal claw. Each podomere from the fourth segment is wide and flattened, with most of them bearing tubercles and sparse pairs of long setae along the inner side. Within this section, the first pair of walking legs has one less segment than the other three, resulting in a total count of 7 segments for the first leg, which is unusual for a pycnogonid, in contrast to the usual 8 segments of the remaining 3 pairs.

== Taxonomy ==
In the original description, Pentapantopus was thought to be a crown-group pycnogonid (Pantopoda), based on the purported polymerous legs, a rare but derived feature only occurring in Pantopoda. This was questioned by the redescription in 2024, as there were considered to be only 4 pairs of legs, and other newly discovered features (alternated leg segments and the possibility of bearing clawed palps, annulated coxae and segmented abdomen) suggest it is unlikely to be a pantopod. Both the original paper and redescription agreed on its similarities to Haliestes, the latter also suggest their legs are the same type as Palaeoisopus, but it is uncertain if this type represents a clade or evolutionary grade of stem-group Pycnogonida.

== Etymology ==
The name Pentapantopus derives from the word "penta" meaning "5" in reference to the belief that it had five pairs of walking legs, alongside "pantopus", a common suffix for sea spiders. The species name vogteli honours Hans Vogtel, a former slate worker who helped find numerous fossils during the process of roof-slate production.
