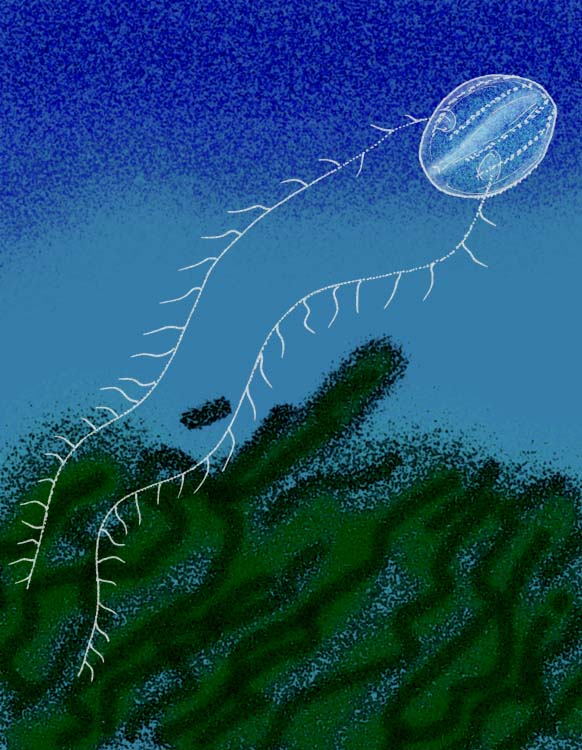
- Artist's reconstruction

Scientific classification
- Domain: Eukaryota
- Kingdom: Animalia
- Phylum: Ctenophora
- Class: Tentaculata
- Order: Cydippida
- Genus: †Paleoctenophora
- Species: †P. brasseli

Binomial name
- †Paleoctenophora brasseli Stanley & Stürner, 1983

= Paleoctenophora =

Paleoctenophora brasseli

Extinct genus of comb jellies

Paleoctenophora brasseli is a fossil species of ctenophore, found in Devonian slate near the German town of Buntenbach in Hunsrück, Germany, as a member of the Hunsrück Slate Lagerstätte.

== Paleobiology ==
It is approximately 400 million years old. Compared to the other Hunsrück species, Archaeocydippida hunsrueckiana, P. brasseli is poorly preserved. Portions of comb rows are preserved, but the number can not be determined: P. brasseli is assumed to have around 8 rows, based on comparison with the similar-looking modern sea gooseberry genus, Pleurobrachia, from the North Sea. The specimen does show the statocyst, however.

Both specimens of A. hunsrueckiana and P. brasseli are too delicate to be prepared, and all information extracted from them have been done via radiography

== Etymology ==
It is named after the fossil collector Günther Brassel and first documented in Nature magazine in 1983. The only known example is now in the Bavarian State Collection.
