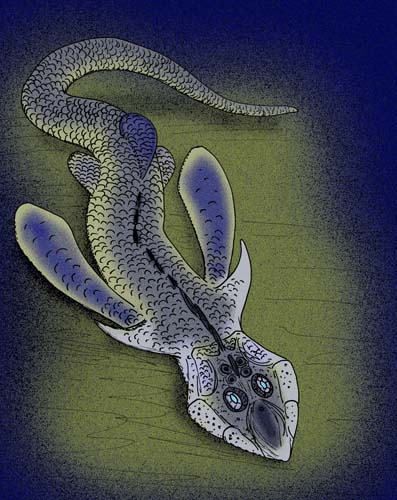
- Artist's reconstruction

Scientific classification
- Kingdom: Animalia
- Phylum: Chordata
- Class: Placodermi
- Order: Pseudopetalichthyida
- Family: Paraplesiobatidae
- Genus: Paraplesiobatis Broili, 1933
- Species: P. heinrichsi

Binomial name
- Paraplesiobatis heinrichsi Broili, 1933

= Paraplesiobatis =

Paraplesiobatis Temporal range: Emsian

Paraplesiobatis heinrichsi is a lightly armored pseudopetalichthyid placoderm from the Hunsrückschiefer Lagerstätte of Early Devonian Germany. The type and only known specimen is an articulated, but very incomplete individual consisting of a large, incomplete, plate-covered head, and some of the vertebral column, with a total length of 10 centimeters. The specimen strongly resembles Pseudopetalichthys to the point that many experts suggest they may be of the same genus or species, though because the only specimens of both genera are so poorly preserved, talk of synonymizing the two cannot begin (let alone continue) until more, better preserved specimens are found.
