= Cambronatus =

Cambronatus Temporal range: Emsian

Scientific classification
- Domain: Eukaryota
- Kingdom: Animalia
- Phylum: Arthropoda
- Class: incertae sedis
- Genus: †Cambronatus; Briggs & Bartels, 2001
- Species: †C. brasseli

Binomial name
- †Cambronatus brasseli Briggs & Bartels, 2001

Extinct genus of arthropod

Cambronatus is a genus of Devonian arthropod from the Hunsrück Slate of Germany. It contains one species, Cambronatus brasseli.

== Description ==
Cambronatus was roughly 7 cm long and somewhat resembled modern shrimp. The head was covered by a simple head shield longer than wide, with a raised margin. The first pair of head limbs were biramous antennae, with around 400 annulations on the longer ramus. The next four pairs were all relatively similar, with around 15 short podomeres, each with a stout spine. These appendages appear to have been uniramous, and what seems to be the fifth pair shows bunches of smaller, inward-facing spines. Eyes appear to be absent. The trunk consists of 11 segments, with overlapping tergites diminishing in length towards the posterior. The first ten trunk somites have uniramous limbs much like the head, however in this case the flap-like exopod is present. The most unusual feature of Cambronatus, however, is the eleventh trunk appendage. This appendage was triramous, with a flagella-like first ramus, alongside two paddle-shaped ones which formed a tail fan together with the telson. This telson was at least partially fringed with spines, with flagelliform structures on its tip forming a caudal furca.

== Etymology ==
Cambronatus derives from the unusual morphology of the animal, which makes it seem almost as if it belongs in the Cambrian. The species name brasseli honours Günther Brassel, who made major contributions to the study of Hunsrück Slate fossils for more than 35 years.

== Paleobiology ==
Cambronatus likely lived in a low-visibility environment, as evidenced by the lack of eyes and numerous antenna-like structures. The graduated length and spines of the head appendages suggest they were used to capture prey, similarly to habeliids. The trunk appendages were likely the main propulsive organs, with setae greatly enhancing thrust and the lobate structure of the flaps alongside the possibly retractable nature of the setae reducing drag on the recovery stroke. The tail fan likely was used for steering, and while it may have provided some propulsive force it was unlikely to be the main swimming organ. Combining all these suggests Cambronatus likely inhabited muddy environments, swimming just above the bottom and detecting softer prey with its various antenniform structures, before capturing it with its head appendages.
