= Palasteriscus =

Palasteriscus Temporal range: Devonian

Scientific classification
- Kingdom: Animalia
- Phylum: Echinodermata
- Class: Asteroidea
- Genus: †Palasteriscus

Extinct genus of starfishes

Palasteriscus is an extinct genus of sea star from the Lower Devonian.
