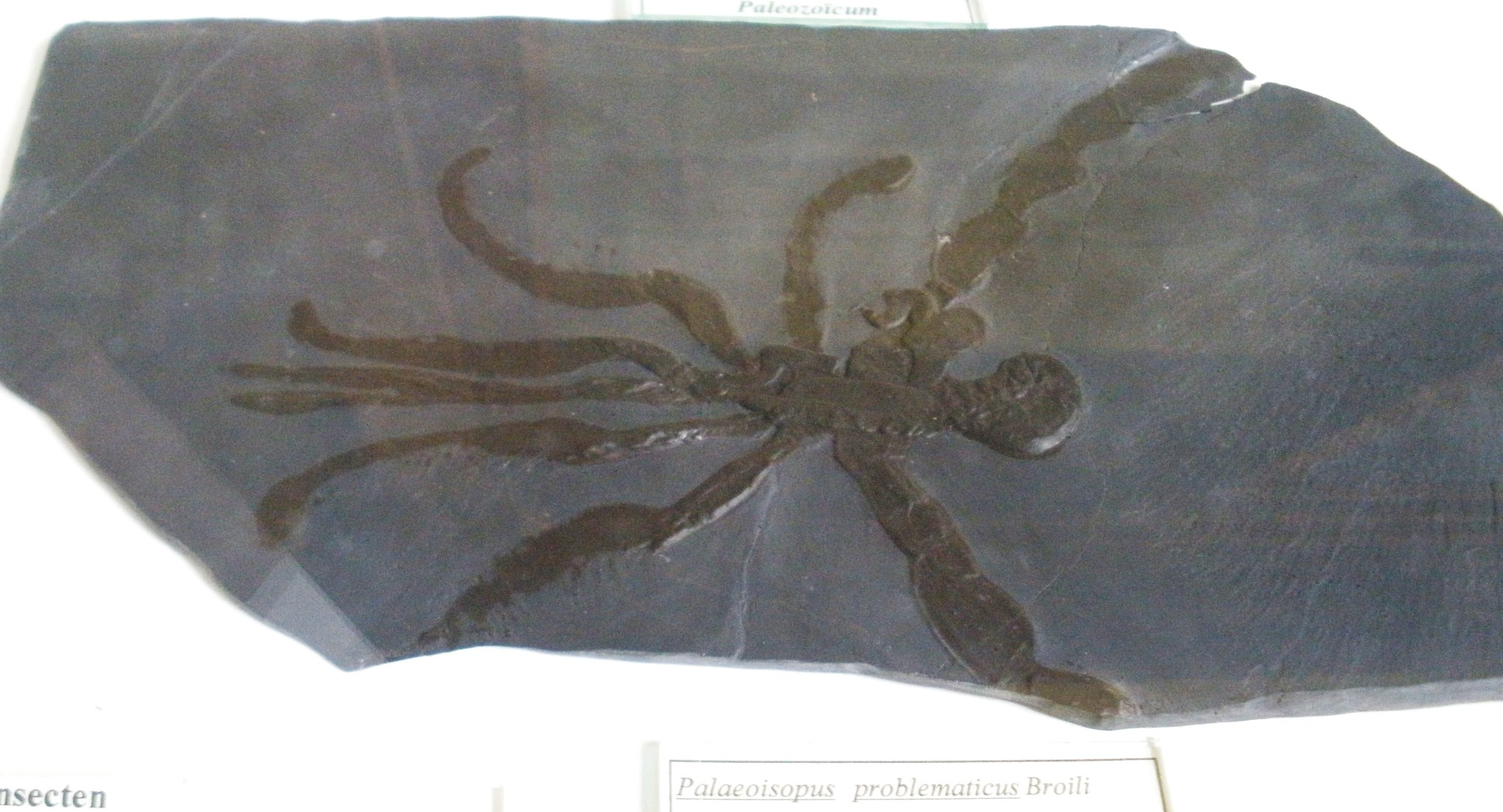
- Fossil
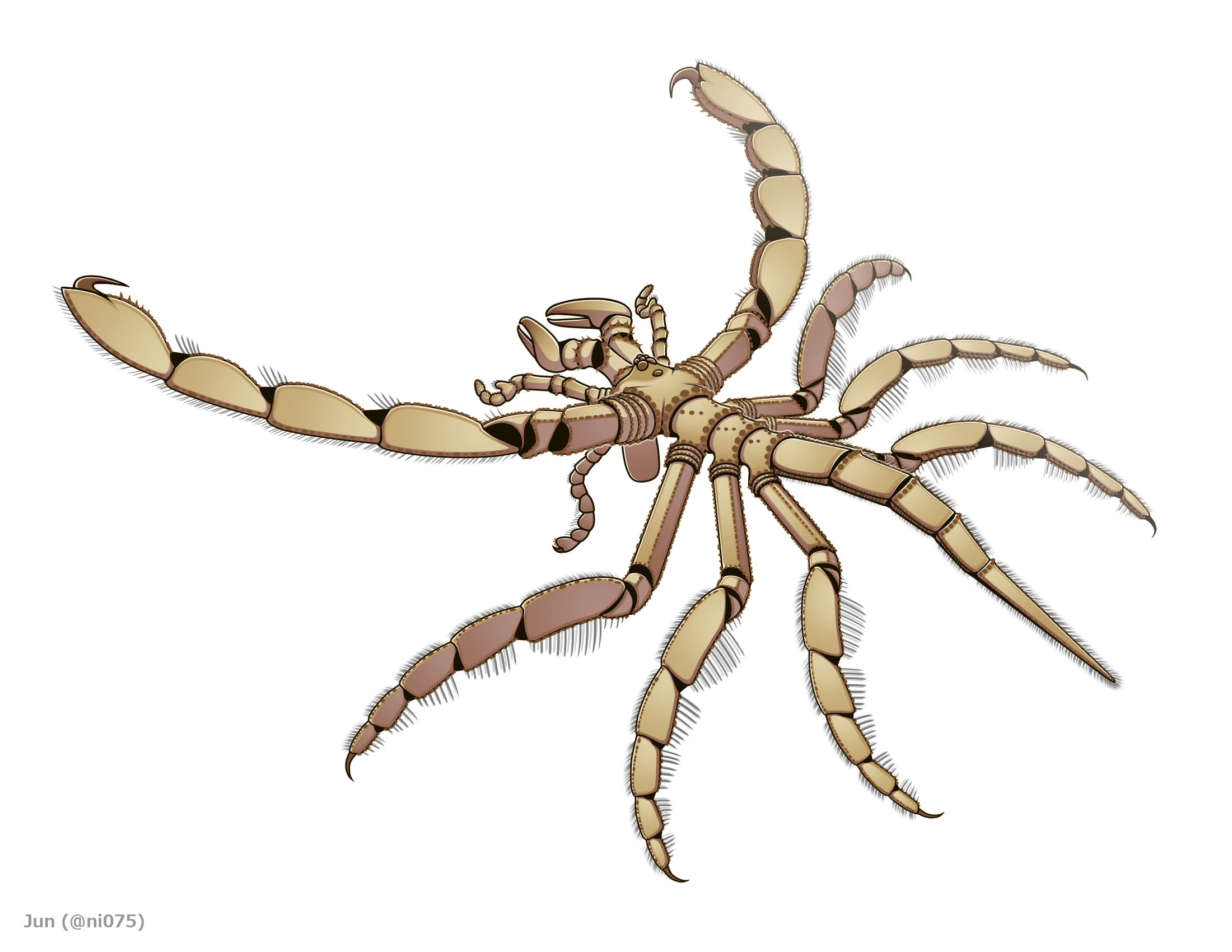
- Reconstruction

Scientific classification
- Kingdom: Animalia
- Phylum: Arthropoda
- Subphylum: Chelicerata
- Class: Pycnogonida
- Order: †Palaeoisopoda; Hedgpeth, 1978
- Family: †Palaeoisopodidae; Dubinin, 1957
- Genus: †Palaeoisopus; Broili, 1928
- Species: †P. problematicus

Binomial name
- †Palaeoisopus problematicus Broili, 1928

= Palaeoisopus =

Palaeoisopus Temporal range: Lower Devonian

Extinct genus of sea spiders

Palaeoisopus is a genus of fossil pycnogonid (sea spider). The only known species is Palaeoisopus problematicus from the Lower Devonian Hunsrück Slate of Germany. It is characterized by several features unusual for a pycnogonid, such as swimming legs of different sizes and a long, segmented abdomen.

== Discovery ==
Palaeoisopus is the most common pycnogonid of Hunsrück Slate, with over 80 fossil specimens had been discovered as of 2024.

When this arthropod was first described by Broili 1928, it was thought to be an isopod crustacean, hence the name Palaeoisopus. A few years later, it was reidentified as a pycnogonid by the same author. Even so, the anterior and posterior axis was reversed, with the overlapped chelifores and long abdomen being misinterpreted as a round abdomen and an elongated cephalon (head), respectively. This was corrected by Lehmann 1959, which using X-ray to identify cephalic structures such as ovigers and ocular tubercles between the "abdomen" (chelifores) and "fourth legs" (first legs). Bergström et al. 1980 using the same method to study more specimens, providing a detailed reconstruction of Palaeoisopus. Sabroux et al. 2024 redescribed this genus alongside other Hunsrück pycnogonid fossils, by using both X-ray and RTI method they discover some new details, mostly those of the cephalic structures.

== Morphology ==
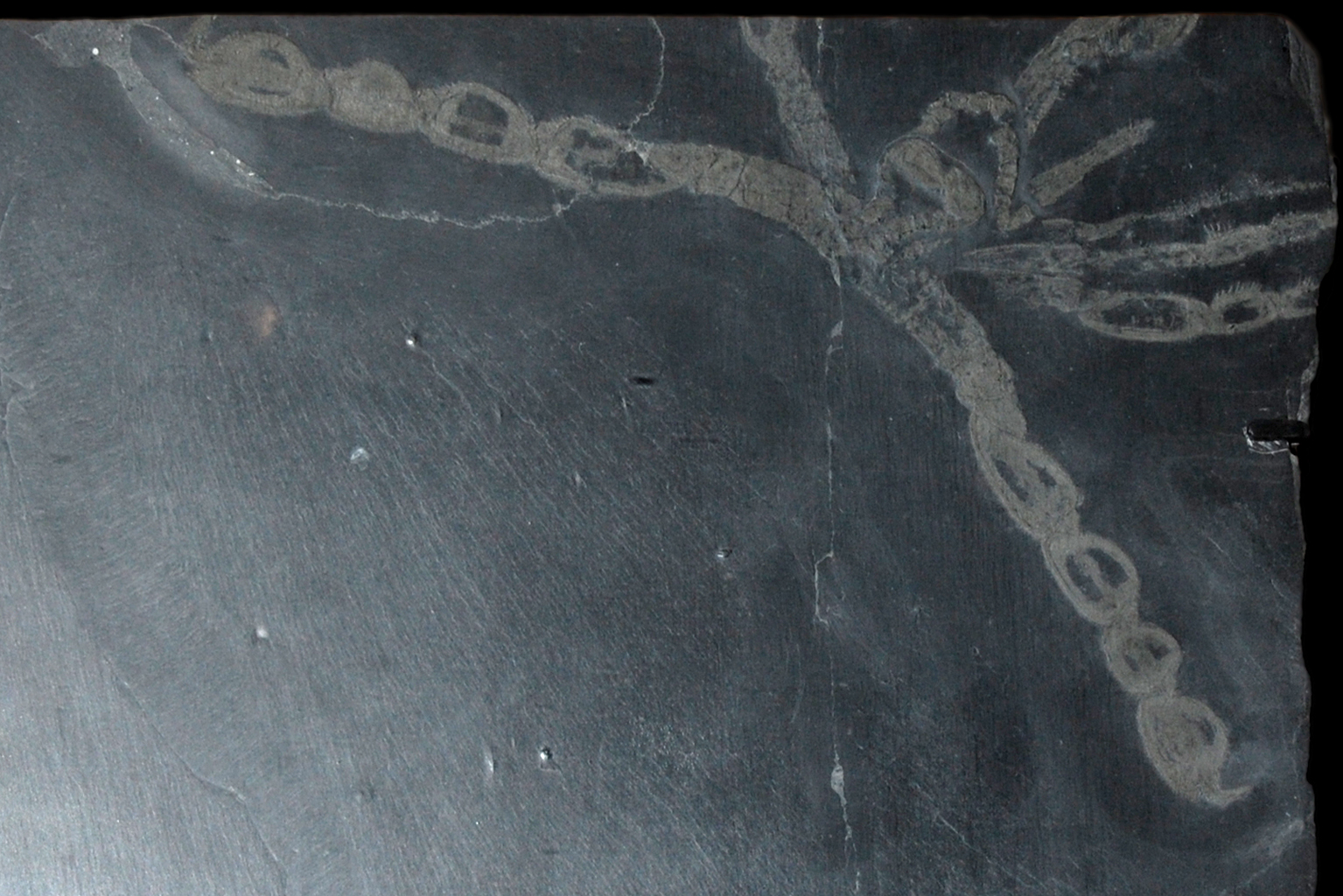
Fossil showing the long, fully-extended front legs

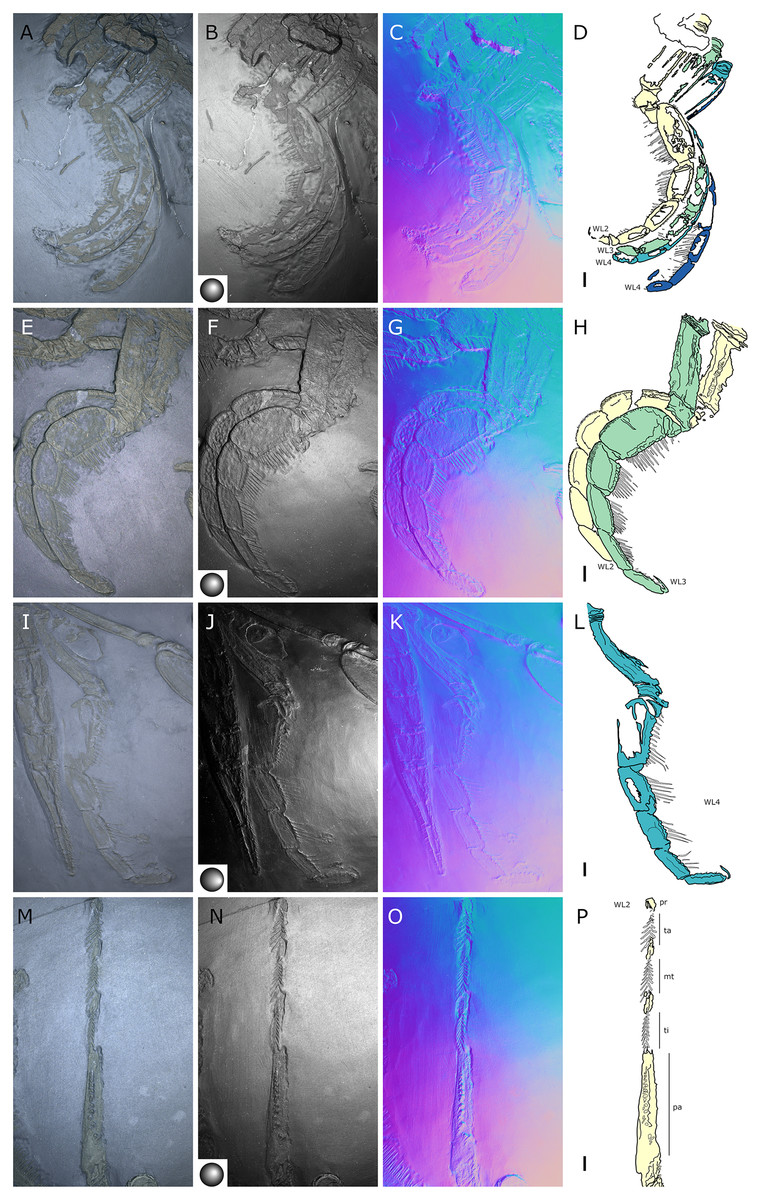
Details of second to fourth legs

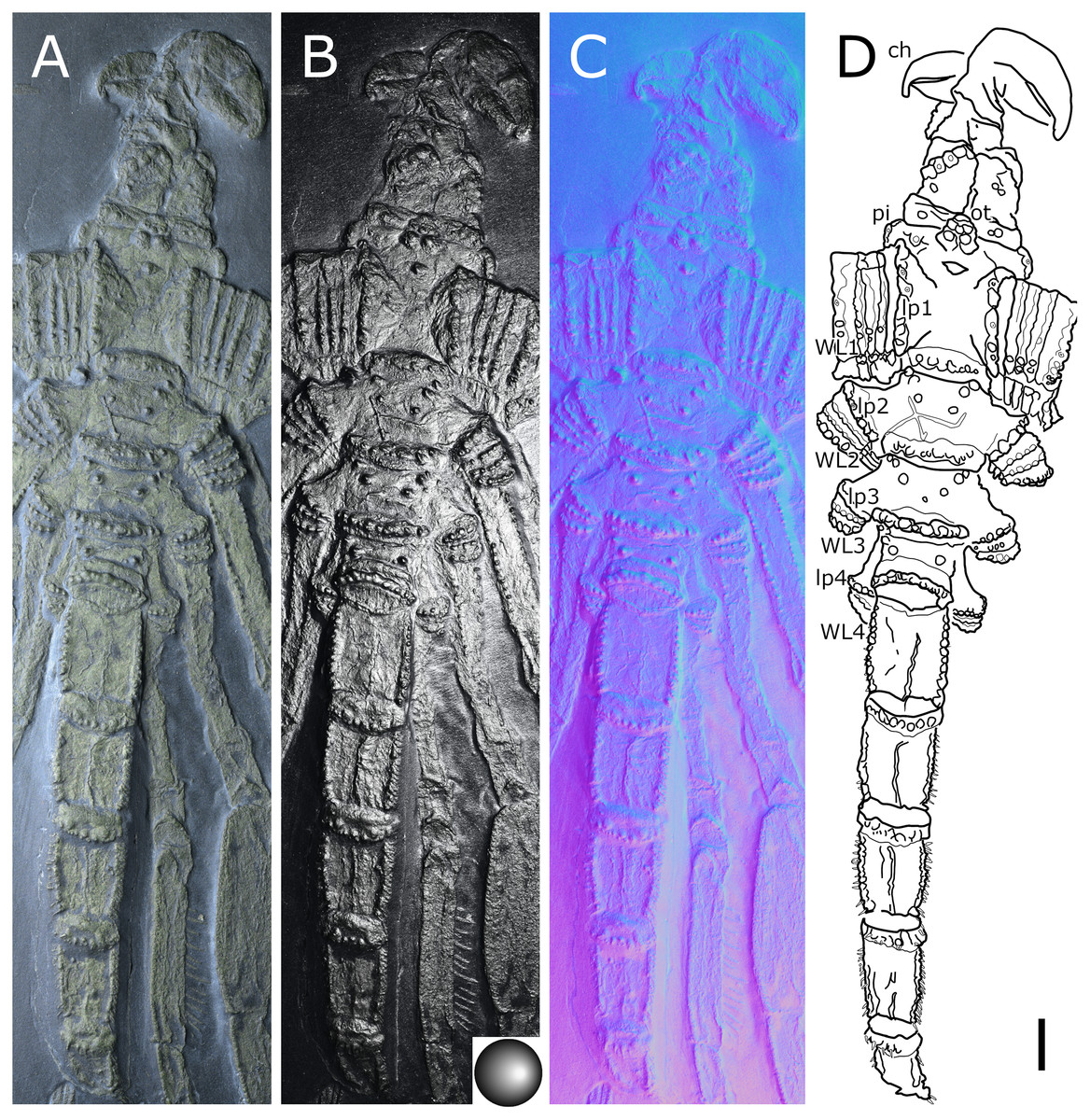
Main body

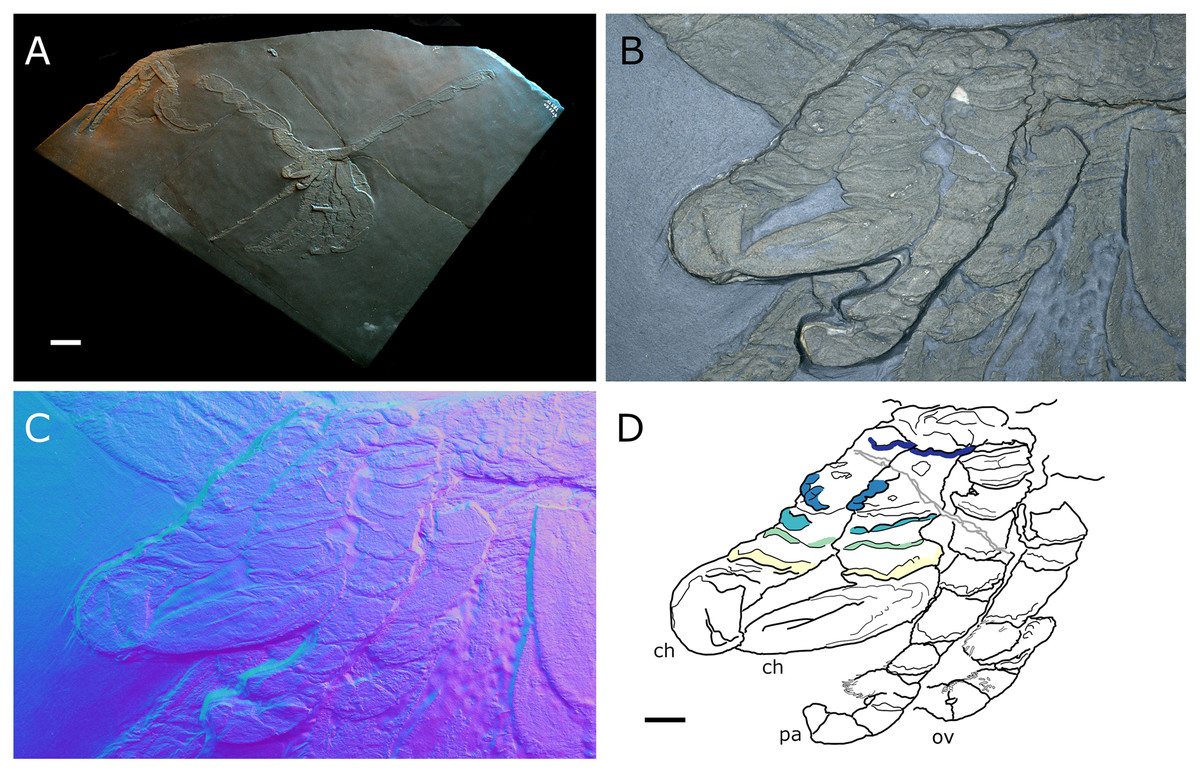
Chelifores, palps and ovigers

Palaeoisopus is a large pycnogonid, with a body length (excluding proboscis and chelifores) of at least 12.5 cm and leg spans of up to 40 cm, comparable to a modern Colossendeis (giant sea spider).

The margin of its exoskeleton are ornamented with tubercles. The body is widest at the box-shaped cephalon, with a cylinderal proboscis folded underneath it. The succeeding 3 trunk segments have pairs of dorsal tubercle and narrow towards the long abdomen. The abdomen apparently compose of 4 flexible segments and a styliform (sword-like) telson, but based on the medial position of anus (which, in telson-bearing chelicerates, always located at the ventral boundary of abdomen and telson), the latter was also suggest to be a fusion of fifth abdominal segment and the original telson.

There is a dorsal ocular tubercle at the front of its cephalon. In the classical reconstruction by Lehmann 1959 and Bergström et al. 1980, it compose of a pair of large eyes and 2 smaller eyes arranged in a midline, unlike the 2-paired ocelli of other pycnogonids. In the redescription by Sabroux et al. 2024, it was reinterpreted as having no eyes, with the purported eye-like structures representing either just tubercles or lateral sense organs.

The first appendages are a pair of robust, pincer-like chelifores in front of the cephalon. Based on Bergström et al. 1980, each chelifore compose of 5 segments (podomere): 3 for scape and 2 for pincer, instead of 3 or 4 (1 or 2 for scape and 2 for pincer) like those of the other pycnogonids. This was questioned by Sabroux et al. 2024, as the putative "second and third scape segment" might be just a second scape segment with an additional midway ridge. The palps and ovigers located laterally and lateroventrally to the anterior cephalic region, respectively. Each apparently have more segments (11 and 12) than those of other pycnogonids (up to 9 and 10), but their 3 basal "segments" might represent annulations of a subdivided first segment (coxa 1) as seen in the legs. The palps have a spur on its fourth distalmost segments and the ovigers terminated by a claw. The ovigers were apparently absent in some specimens, which may represent sexual dimorphism as seen in some modern pycnogonid taxa such as Pycnogonidae and Phoxichilidiidae (female lacking ovigers).

The remaining appendages are 4 pairs of enormous legs. Unlike other pycnogonids with subequal legs, each pair of them are different in sizes (smaller towards the posterior). The base was surrounded by multiple ring-like annulations (4 for leg 1, 3 for leg 2, 2 for leg 3-4) that represent coxa 1, connected to the short lateral processes of cephalon and trunk. The distal section (beyond the fourth segment/femur, which is unusually short for a pycnogonid) was flatten, lined with marginal setae and terminated by a robust, hook-like claw. The first legs are distinctive: they have significantly widen coxae, their flatten distal section compose of 4 segments with subequal width and bore a few ventral setae at each of their distal corner. In comparison, the second to fourth legs have 5 flatten distal segments that narrow towards the end and possess double rows of long ventral setae.

== Paleoecology ==
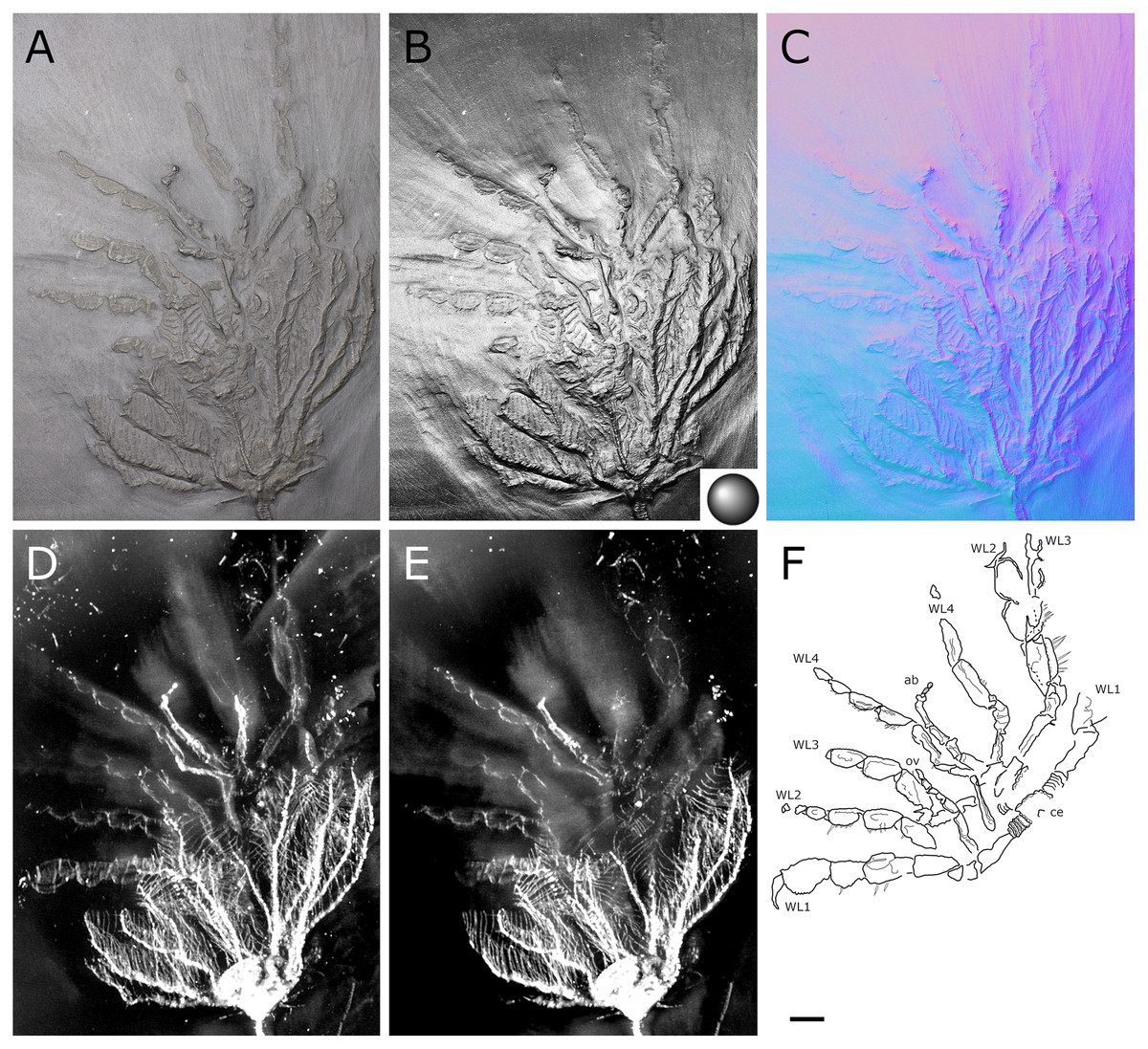
specimen associated with a crinoid

Palaeoisopus may have been a nektonic pycnogonid that swam around the sea floor by moving its oar-like legs. The robust chelifores and hooked claws suggest it was a predator. Based on the purported large eyes, Bergström et al. 1980 suggest it rely on visual cues to find preys, with associated stalked crinoid (sea lily) as a possible target. This was questioned by Sabroux et al. 2024, as they reinterpreted it as blind and the association with crinoid was limited only to juvenile specimens.

== Taxonomy ==
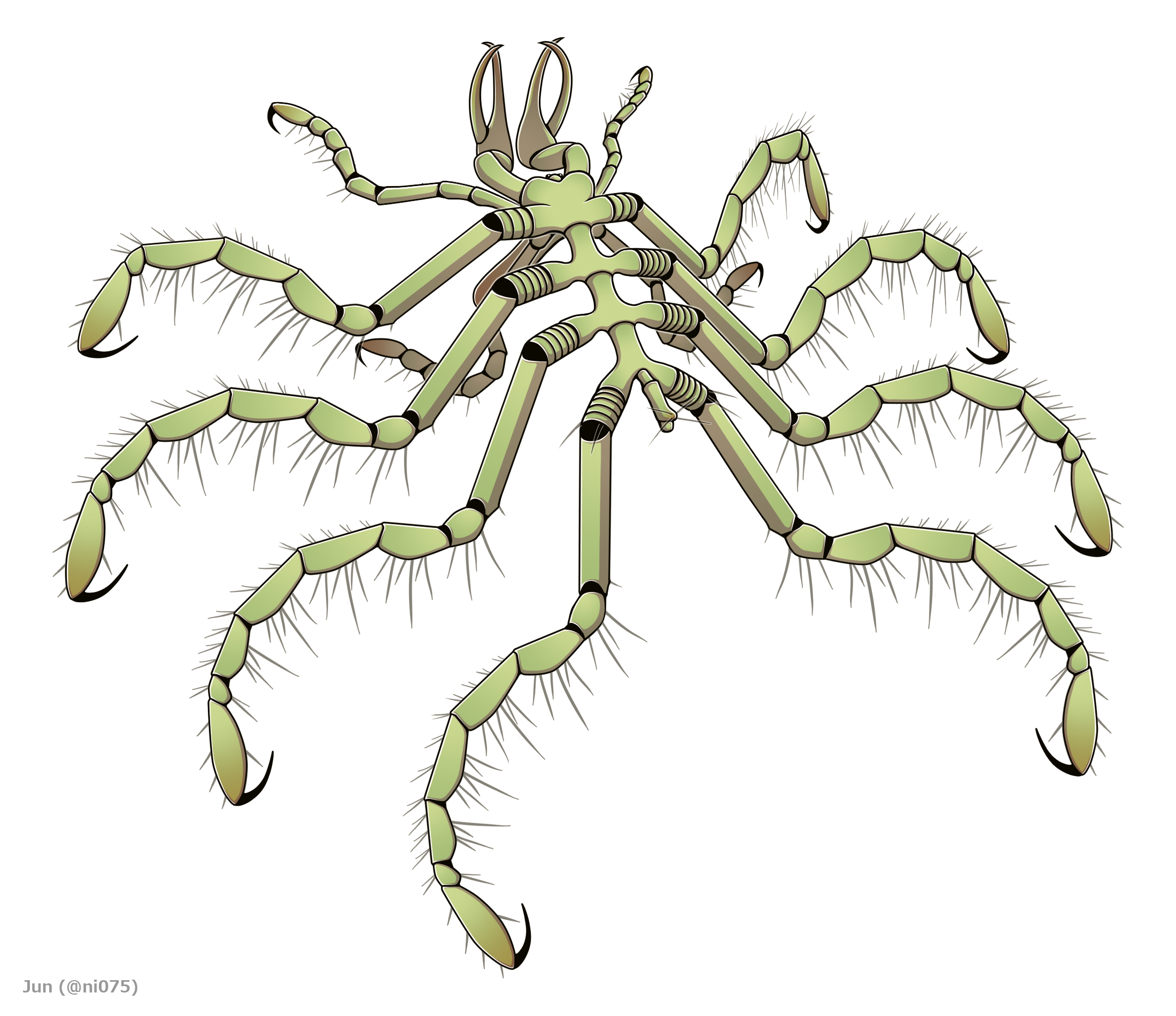
Haliestes

Paleosiopus may have been a basal, stem-group pycnogonid, as its long, segmented abdomen and telson likely represent an ancestral traits, suggesting it branched off before the pycnogonid stem lineage started to reduce the abdomen into a short, unsegmented tubercle. There are some other Paleozoic pycnogonids with similar leg morphology to this genus (possess annulated coxa 1, flatten distal segments, marginal setae, hooked claws and first leg pair with 1 less segment) such as the older Haliestes and coexisting Pentapantopus, but it is unknown if this leg type represent a clade or evolutionary grade of pycnogonid stem-group. While some analysis placing them within Pantopoda (crown-group pycnogonids), this result is questionable as they have low support value and based on outdated reconstruction of the fossil taxa.
