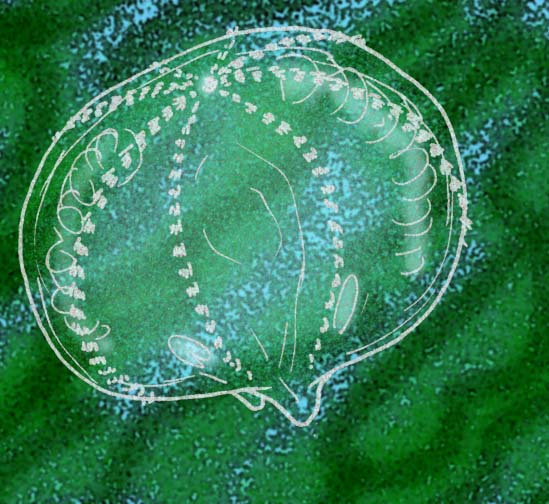
- Artist's reconstruction

Scientific classification
- Kingdom: Animalia
- Phylum: Ctenophora
- Class: Tentaculata
- Order: Cydippida
- Genus: †Archaeocydippida
- Species: †A. hunsrueckiana

Binomial name
- †Archaeocydippida hunsrueckiana Stanley & Stürner, 1987

= Archaeocydippida =

Archaeocydippida hunsrueckiana Temporal range: Emsian

Extinct species of comb jelly

Archaeocydippida hunsrueckiana is an extinct species of comb jelly in the class Tentaculata, order Cydippida. Only one specimen is known and was found in Early Devonian slate near the German town of Buntenbach, Hunsrück, as a member of the Hunsrück Slate Lagerstätte. It is similar to another species from the same formation, Paleoctenophora brasseli.

A. hunsrueckiana is approximately 400 million years old and shows 8 clearly recognizable comb rows with comb plates.

Both specimens of A. hunsrueckiana and P. brasseli are too delicate to be prepared, and all information extracted from them have been done via radiography.
