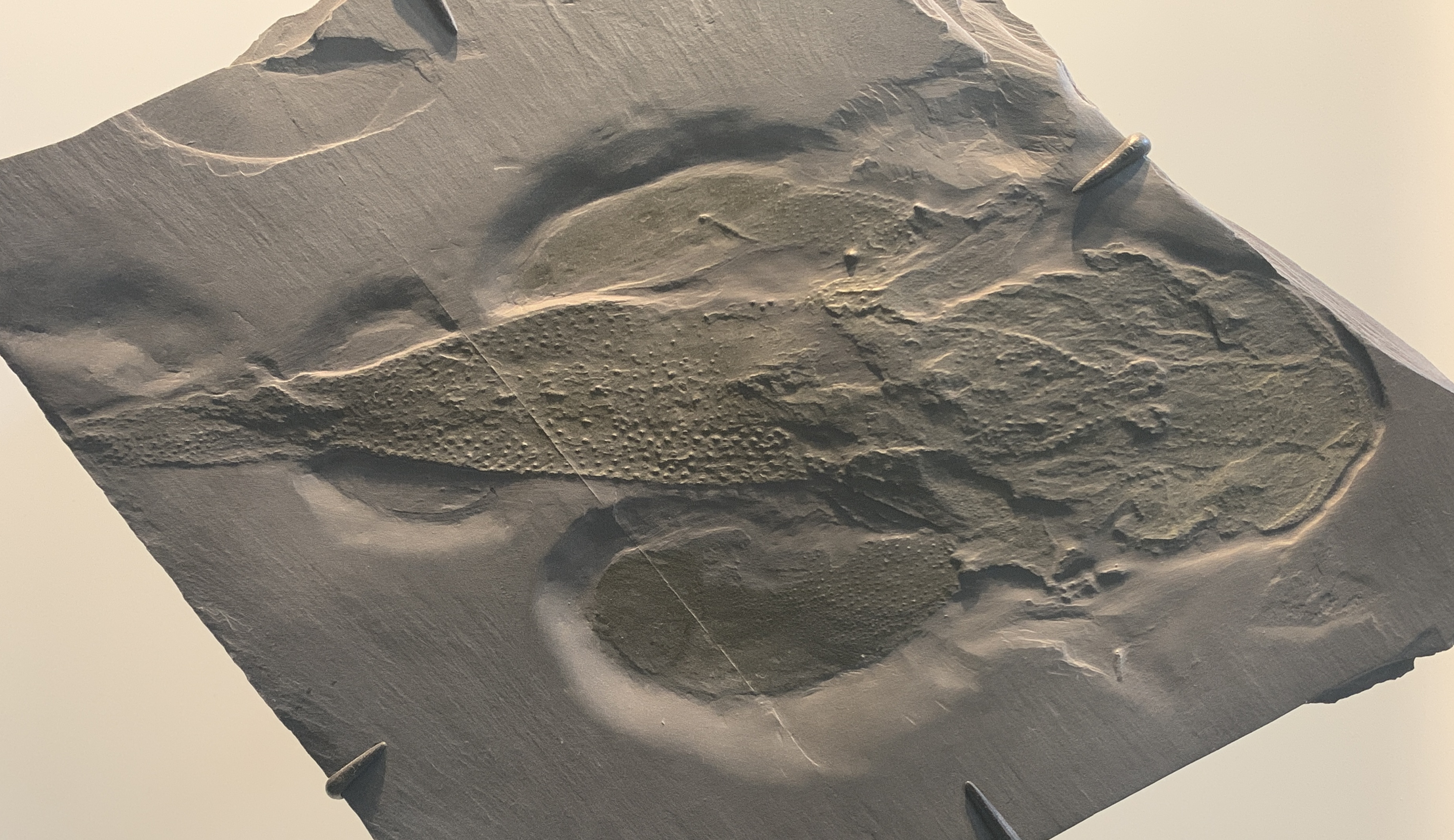
- Cast of specimen from Hunsrück, Budenbach, Germany.
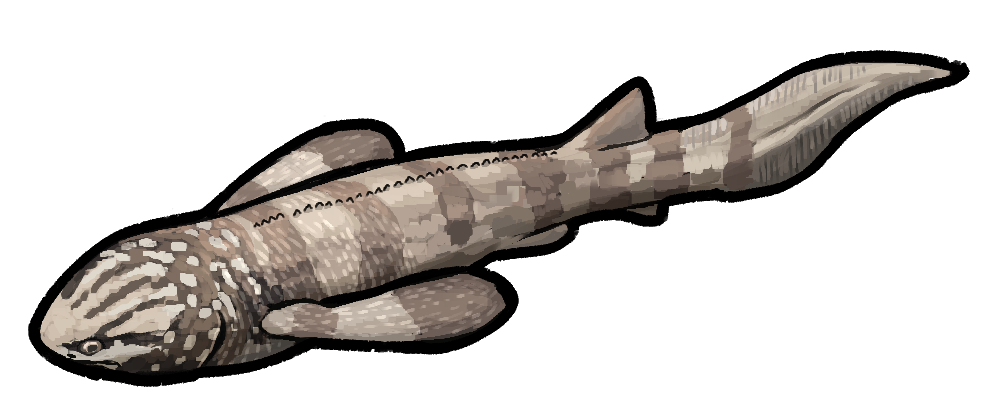
- Reconstruction

Scientific classification
- Domain: Eukaryota
- Kingdom: Animalia
- Phylum: Chordata
- Class: †Placodermi
- Order: †Stensioellida; Romer, 1945
- Family: †Stensioellidae; Berg, 1940
- Genus: †Stensioella; Broili, 1933
- Species: †S. heintzi

Binomial name
- †Stensioella heintzi Broili, 1933

= Stensioella =

Stensioella Temporal range: Emsian

Extinct genus of fishes

Stensioella heintzi is an enigmatic placoderm of arcane affinity. It is only known from the Lower Devonian Hunsrück slate of Germany. The genus is named after Erik Stensiö, the species name honours Anatol Heintz.

== Anatomy ==
Stensioella heintzi has an elongated body, a whip-like tail, and long, wing-like pectoral fins. In life, the animal would have looked vaguely like an elongated ratfish. Like the sympatric Gemuendina, S. heintzi had armor made up of a complex mosaic of small, scale-like tubercles.

== Taxonomy ==
Stensioella is tentatively placed within Placodermi as being among the most basal of all placoderms, as from what can be discerned from the only whole specimen found, the shoulder joints of its armor appear to be very similar to other placoderms. Despite this detail, coupled with superficial similarities in skull plates, and gross, superficial similarities between its tubercles, and the tubercles of the rhenanids, some paleontologists believe that there are very few concrete reasons for S. heintzi's placement in Placodermi. The paleontologist, Philippe Janvier suggests that it was actually a holocephalid, and not a placoderm at all. However, if this is true, then the holocephalids (chimaeras, iniopterygians, petalodonts, et al.) diverged from sharks before the Chondrichthyan Devonian radiation.

Aside from a superficially similar bodyplan to primitive holocephalids like Menaspis, critics to Janvier's idea say that there is very little else in common S. heintzi has with holocephalids.
