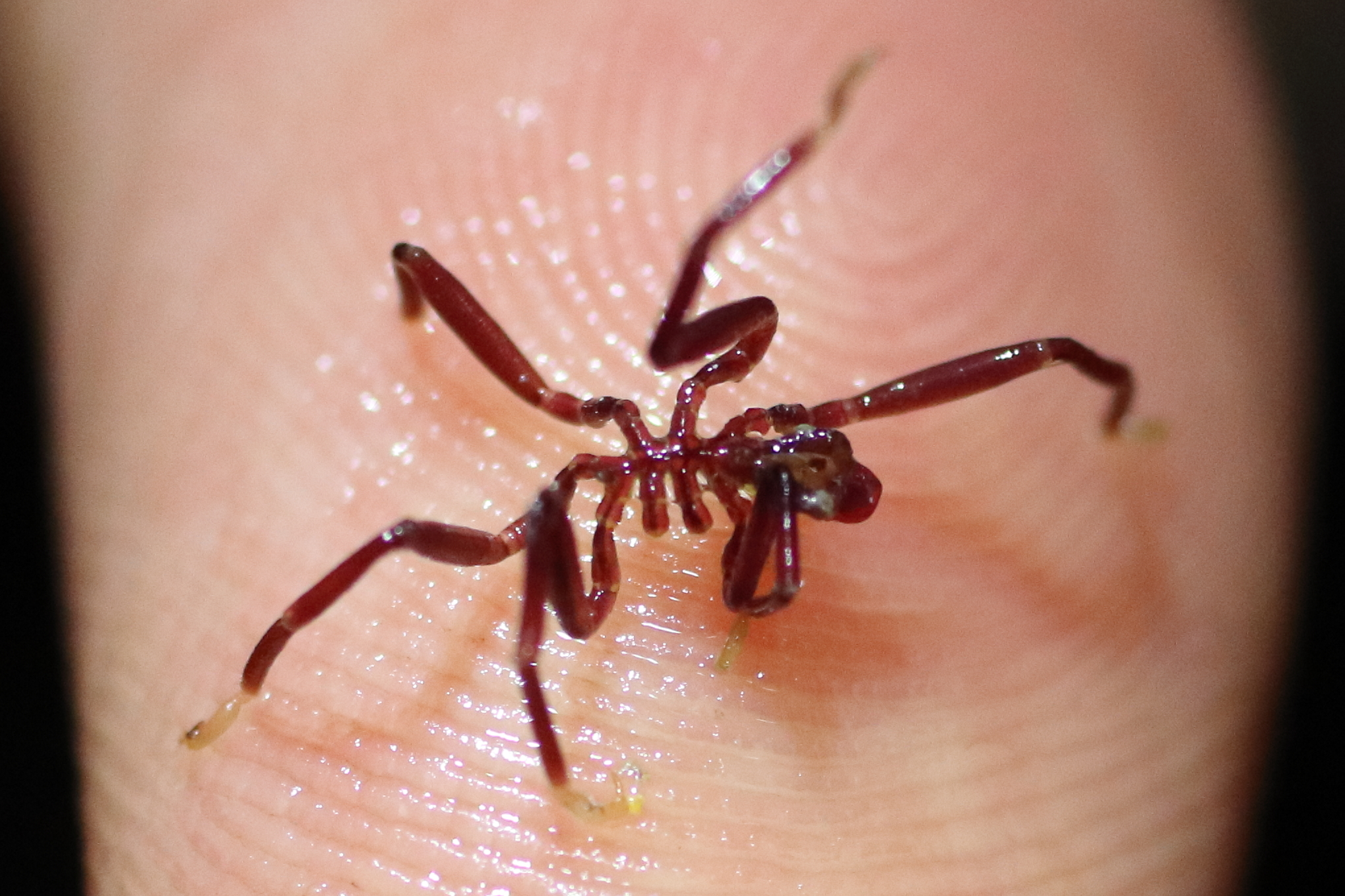
- Phoxichilidium femoratum

Scientific classification
- Kingdom: Animalia
- Phylum: Arthropoda
- Subphylum: Chelicerata
- Class: Pycnogonida
- Order: Pantopoda
- Family: Phoxichilidiidae
- Genus: Phoxichilidium; Milne Edwards, 1840

Synonyms
- Orythia Johnston, 1837

= Phoxichilidium =

Genus of sea spiders

Phoxichilidium is a genus of sea spiders within the family Phoxichilidiidae. Members of this genus can be found in all oceans at depths up to 1074 meters.

== Species ==
- Phoxichilidium alis Bamber, 2013
- Phoxichilidium cheliferum Claparède, 1863
- Phoxichilidium femoratum (Rathke, 1799)
- Phoxichilidium forfex Stock, 1991
- Phoxichilidium horribilis Hedgpeth, 1949
- Phoxichilidium micropalpidum Hilton, 1942
- Phoxichilidium mutilatus Frey & Leuckart, 1847
- Phoxichilidium olivaceum Gosse, 1855
- Phoxichilidium plumulariae Lendenfeld, 1883
- Phoxichilidium ponderosum Stock, 1994
- Phoxichilidium pyrgodum Child, 1995
- Phoxichilidium quadradentatum Hilton W.A., 1942
- Phoxichilidium tuberculatum Stock, 1991
- Phoxichilidium tuberungum Turpaeva, 2006
- Phoxichilidium ungellatum Hedgpeth, 1949
