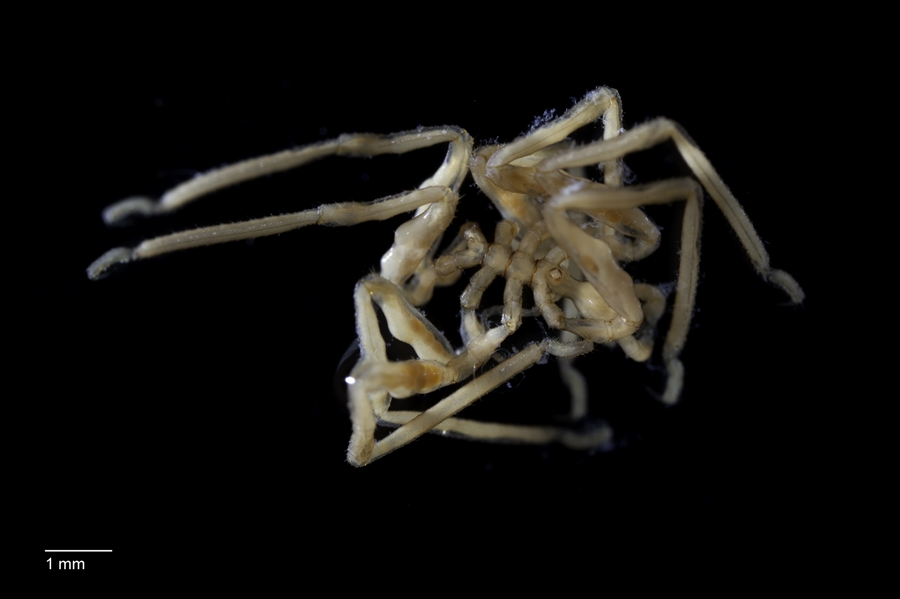

Scientific classification
- Kingdom: Animalia
- Phylum: Arthropoda
- Subphylum: Chelicerata
- Class: Pycnogonida
- Order: Pantopoda
- Family: Callipallenidae
- Genus: Callipallene; Flynn, 1929

= Callipallene =

Genus of sea spiders

Callipallene is a genus of sea spiders in the family Callipallenidae. There are more than 30 described species in Callipallene.

== Species ==
These 38 species belong to the genus Callipallene:

- Callipallene abroliensis Lucena & Christoffersen, 2016
- Callipallene acribica Krapp, 1975
- Callipallene acus (Meinert, 1898)
- Callipallene africana Arnaud & Child, 1988
- Callipallene amaxana (Ohshima, 1933)
- Callipallene belizae Child, 1982
- Callipallene brevirostris (Johnston, 1837)
- Callipallene bullata Nakamura & Child, 1991
- Callipallene californiensis (Hall, 1913)
- Callipallene catulus Lee & Arango, 2003
- Callipallene cinto Müller & Krapp, 2009
- Callipallene conirostris Stock, 1954
- Callipallene cuspidata Stock, 1954
- Callipallene dubiosa Hedgpeth, 1949
- Callipallene emaciata (Dohrn, 1881)
- Callipallene ersei Bamber, 1997
- Callipallene evelinae Marcus, 1940
- Callipallene fallax Stock, 1994
- Callipallene gabriellae Corrêa, 1948
- Callipallene longicoxa Stock, 1955
- Callipallene margarita (Gordon, 1932)
- Callipallene micracantha Stock & J.H., 1954
- Callipallene minuta Müller & Krapp, 2009
- Callipallene novaezealandiae (Thomson, 1884)
- Callipallene ovigerosetosus (Hilton, 1942)
- Callipallene pacifica Hedgpeth, 1939
- Callipallene palpida Hilton, 1939
- Callipallene panamensis Child, 1979
- Callipallene pectinata (Calman, 1923)
- Callipallene phantoma (Dohrn, 1881)
- "Callipallene pilosuspedes" Toler-Scott, Park, Gordon & Leander, 2026
- Callipallene producta (Sars, 1888)
- Callipallene sagamiensis Nakamura & Child, 1983
- Callipallene seychellensis Child, 1988
- Callipallene solicitatus
- Callipallene spectrum (Dohrn, 1881)
- Callipallene tiberi (Dohrn, 1881)
- Callipallene tridens Nakamura & Child, 1988
- Callipallene vexator Stock, 1956
