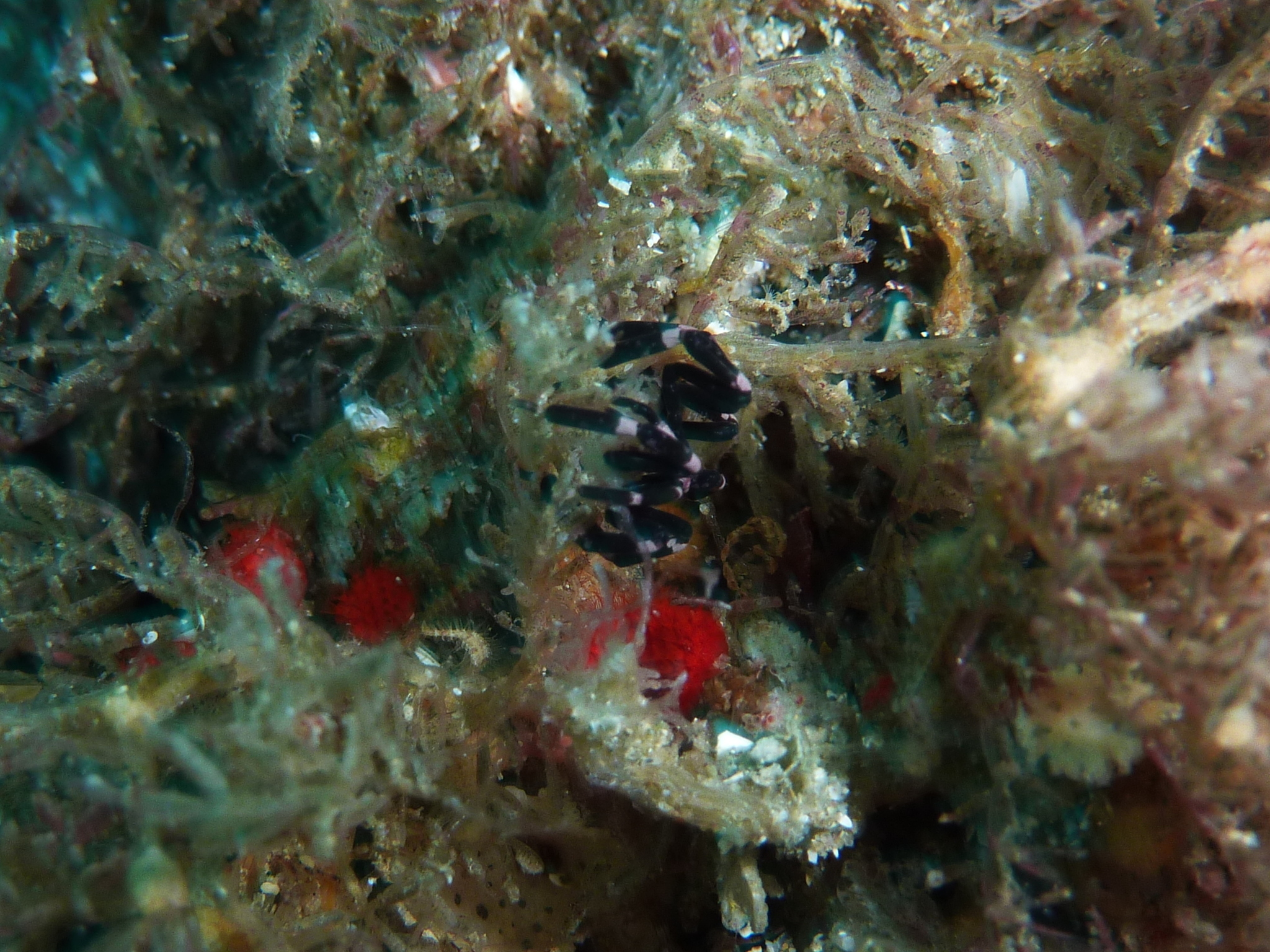
- Stylopallene tubirostris

Scientific classification
- Kingdom: Animalia
- Phylum: Arthropoda
- Subphylum: Chelicerata
- Class: Pycnogonida
- Order: Pantopoda
- Family: Callipallenidae
- Genus: Stylopallene; Clark, 1963

= Stylopallene =

Genus of sea spiders

Stylopallene is a genus of sea spiders within the family Callipallenidae. Members of this are found in marine waters off southern Australia.

== Species ==
- Stylopallene cheilorhynchus Clark, 1963
- Stylopallene longicauda Stock, 1973
- Stylopallene tubirostris Clark, 1963
