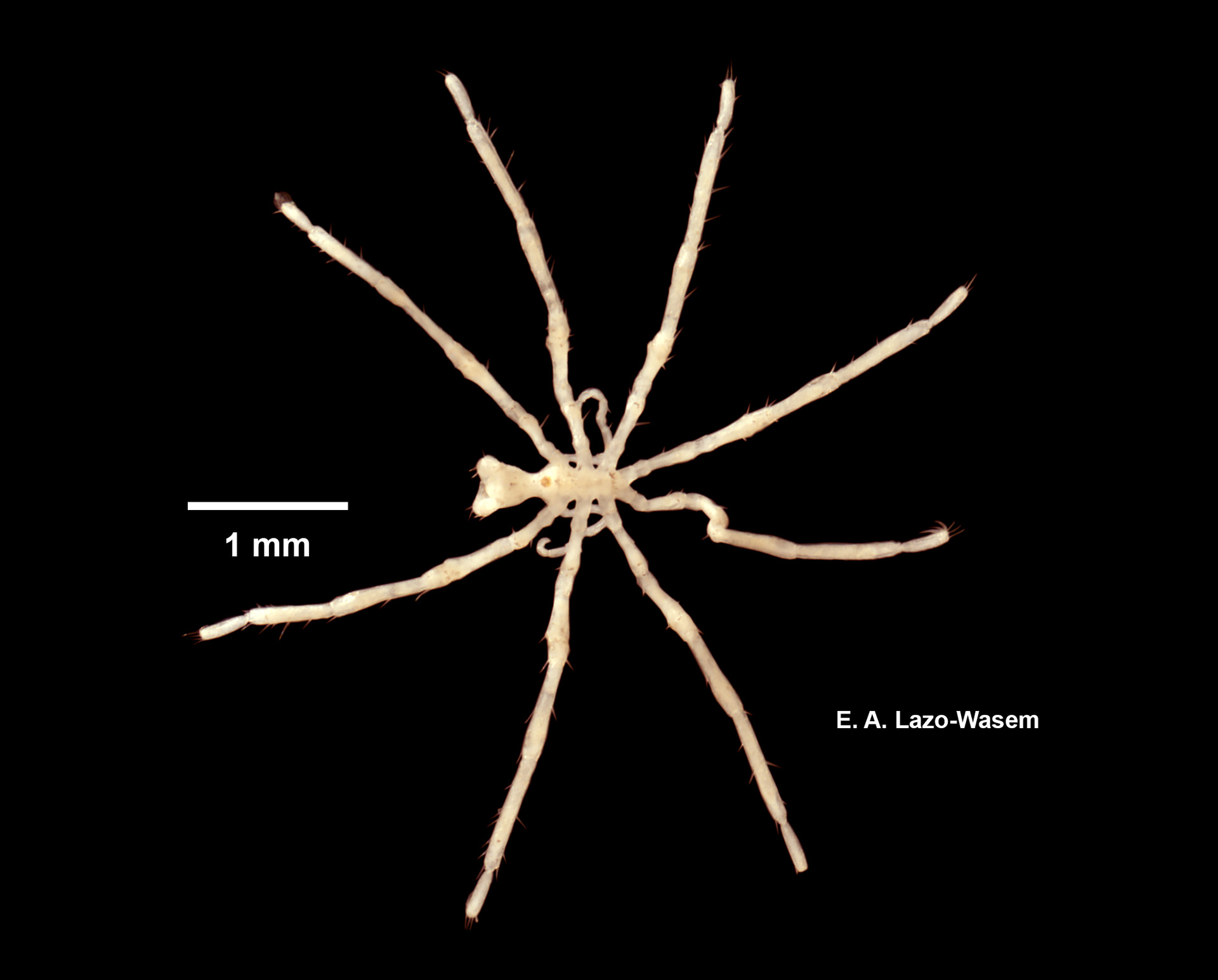

Scientific classification
- Kingdom: Animalia
- Phylum: Arthropoda
- Subphylum: Chelicerata
- Class: Pycnogonida
- Order: Pantopoda
- Family: Callipallenidae
- Genus: Callipallene
- Species: C. brevirostris

Binomial name
- Callipallene brevirostris (Johnston, 1837)

= Callipallene brevirostris =

Species of sea spider

Callipallene brevirostris is a species of sea spider in the family Callipallenidae. It is found in Europe.

== Subspecies ==
These two subspecies belong to the species Callipallene brevirostris:

- Callipallene brevirostris brevirostris (Johnston, 1837)
- Callipallene brevirostris producta (G. O. Sars, 1888)
