= Propallene longiceps =

Scientific classification
- Kingdom: Animalia
- Phylum: Arthropoda
- Subphylum: Chelicerata
- Class: Pycnogonida
- Order: Pantopoda
- Family: Callipallenidae
- Genus: Propallene
- Species: P. longiceps

Binomial name
- Propallene longiceps (Bohm, 1879)

Species of sea spiders

Propallene longiceps is a species of sea spider in the family Callipallenidae. It is found in shallow water in the western Pacific Ocean.

== Description ==
Propallene longiceps has a compact body, the male being slightly more slender than the female. The propodus of the claw is slightly curved and has a number of elongate spines on its heel, and both males and females have hairy legs. The female is distinguishable by the swollen femurs of the walking legs, and the male is notable for the high number of cement gland ducts present, which is usually more than ten.

== Distribution ==
Propallene longiceps is native to the tropical Indo-Pacific region. Its range extends from the Red Sea and the Horn of Africa to India, Malaysia, southern China and Japan.

== Biology ==
In Pycnogonids, the female lays the eggs onto her walking legs, and in most species, the male transfers the eggs to his ovigers (legs adapted for the care of eggs and young), where he fertilises them. This arrangement ensures that the eggs that he will be carrying for the next few months are actually his own offspring. Propallene longiceps is an exception to this however, as in this species, the eggs are fertilised before being transferred to the male.

Egg laying is performed while the male is clinging to the back of the female, the pair being upside-down. The ovaries are in the femurs of each walking leg of the female, and eggs of varying size are present in each ovary. Stimulated by the male's courtship activities, the two largest eggs in each ovary work their way along the inside of each leg, emerging from a gonopore on the coxa after about three minutes. At this stage, the male and female realign so that their ventral surfaces are together, and fertilisation takes place. The female collects the eggs with her ovigerous legs and passes them to the male's ovigerous legs. He accumulates them into egg masses, usually containing eight eggs, and uses mucus to form them into bracelet-like clusters, which he wraps around his ovigerous legs. Further egg rings are added at the proximal ends of the limbs, and there may be four to six rings on each limb. The different egg masses may originate from different females.

The eggs hatch after approximately one week. The first instar larva moults as a hatchling, so the second instar larva is considered the first attached developmental stage. This moults three times while retained on the ovigers, and six further times during its free-living stage in the water column. It will be fully grown and mature about five months after the egg was fertilised.
