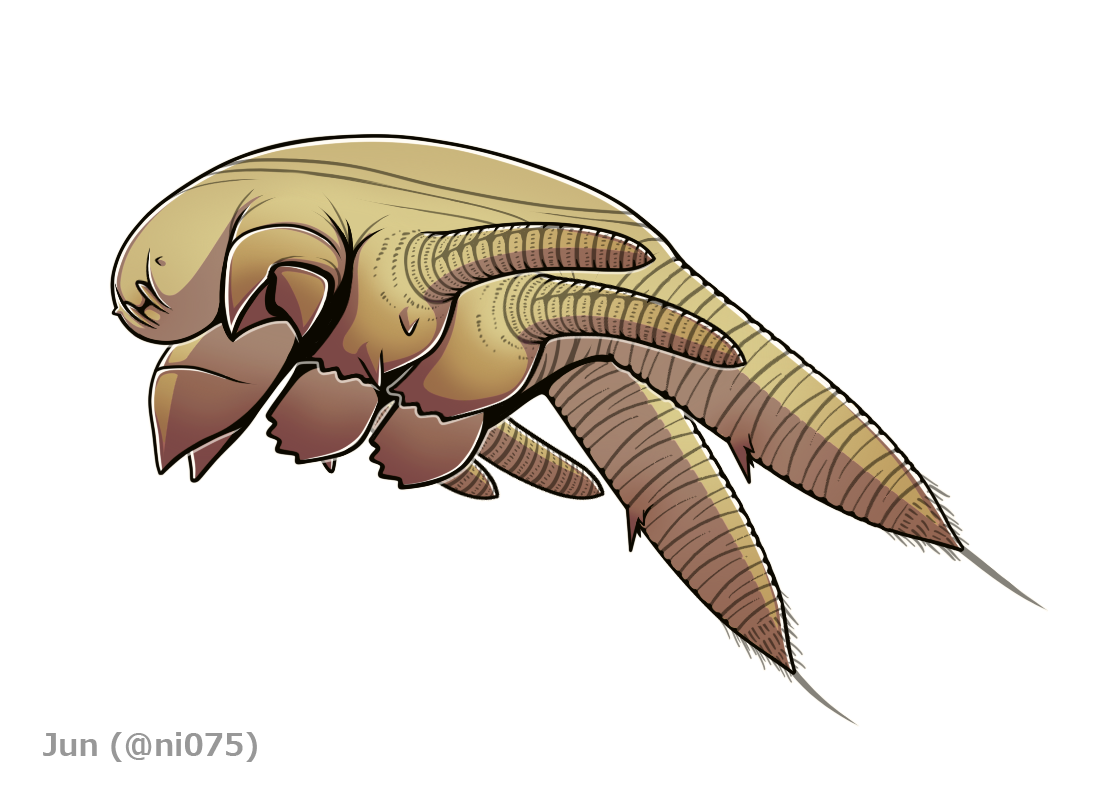
- Reconstruction

Scientific classification
- Kingdom: Animalia
- Phylum: Arthropoda
- Subphylum: Chelicerata
- Class: Pycnogonida
- Genus: †Cambropycnogon; Waloszek and Dunlop, 2002
- Species: †C. klausmuelleri

Binomial name
- †Cambropycnogon klausmuelleri Waloszek and Dunlop, 2002

= Cambropycnogon =

Cambropycnogon Temporal range: Cambrian, 500 Ma

Extinct genus of sea spider

Cambropycnogon is an extinct genus of pycnogonid arthropods. The genus contains a single species, Cambropycnogon klausmuelleri, represented by presumed larval remains from the Upper Cambrian Orsten, having been referred to before description as "Larva D".

== Description ==
Cambropycnogon is an early-stage pycnogonid larva (although this classification has been disputed) around 270 micrometers long, with three pairs of post-cheliceral appendages as well as the chelicerae that mark it as a possible pycnogonid. It also has two large caudal growths from its posterior end, the purpose of which is unknown. Cambropycnogon is covered in small spines roughly 1 micrometer long, as well as larger thorns behind its gnathobases. Its chelicerae are short and stout, resembling pincers, and the larva has a relatively large head shield. Cambropycnogon's morphology matches that of early sea spider larvae such as the protonymph and semaphoront, with it being markedly distinct from all other Orsten fossils.

== Etymology ==
Cambropycnogon derives from its assumed position within Pycnogonida, as well as the fact that it dates from the Cambrian. Its specific name, klausmuelleri honours the discoverer of the Orsten, Dr. Klaus Müller.

== Distribution ==
Cambropycnogon is known from six specimens, all found in Kinnekulle.
