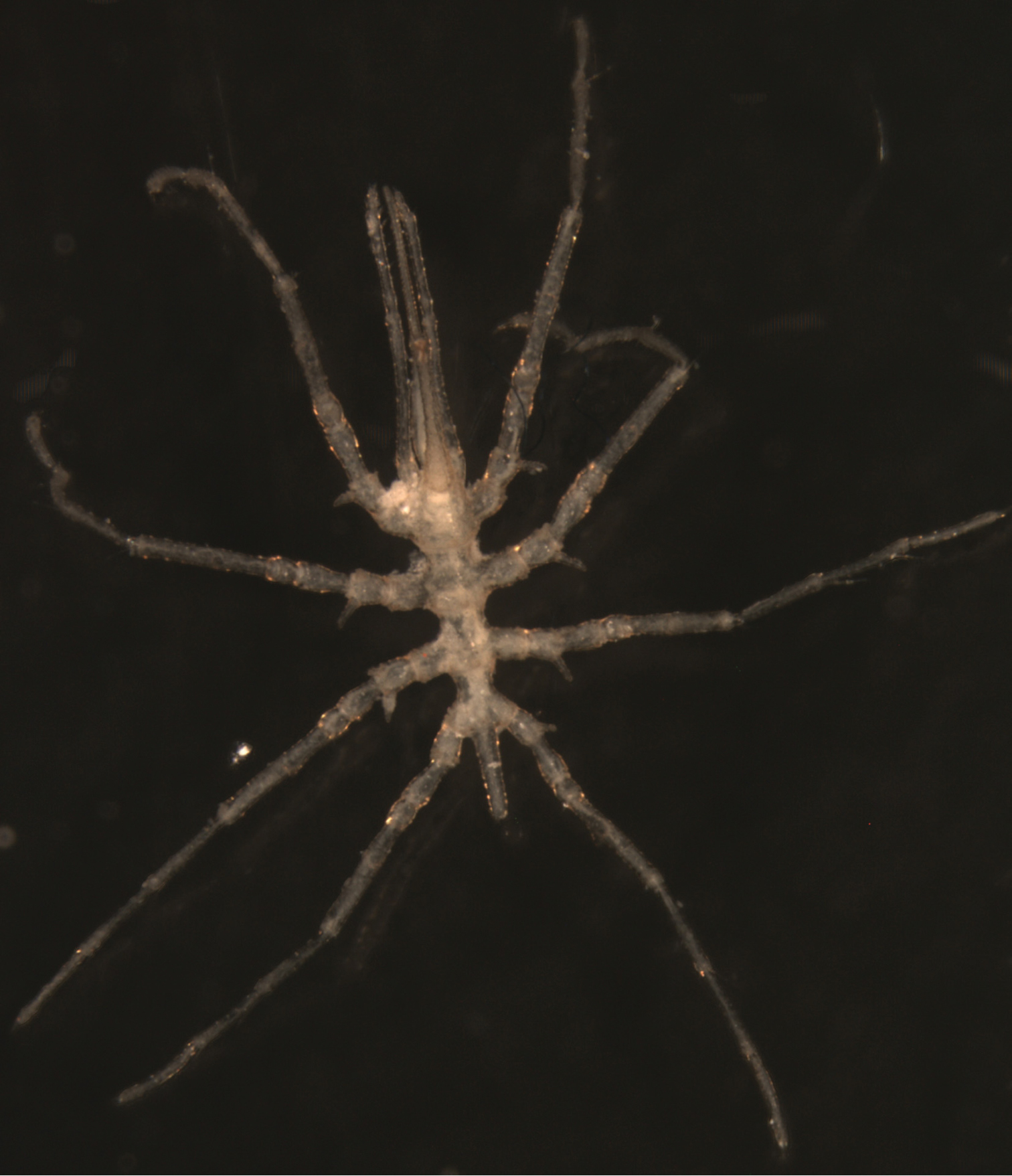
- Austrodecus bamberi

Scientific classification
- Kingdom: Animalia
- Phylum: Arthropoda
- Subphylum: Chelicerata
- Class: Pycnogonida
- Order: Pantopoda
- Suborder: Stiripasterida
- Family: Austrodecidae; Stock, 1954

Genera
- Austrodecus; Pantopipetta

Diversity
- 2 genera, c. 55 species

= Austrodecidae =

Family of sea spiders

Austrodecidae is a family of sea spiders. Austrodecids tend to be small measuring only 1–2 mm, characterized by an annulated proboscis with vertical slit-like mouth opening. It is the most basal family of the order Pantopoda, representing a lineage (Stiripasterida) sister to all other pantopod families (Eupantopodida).
