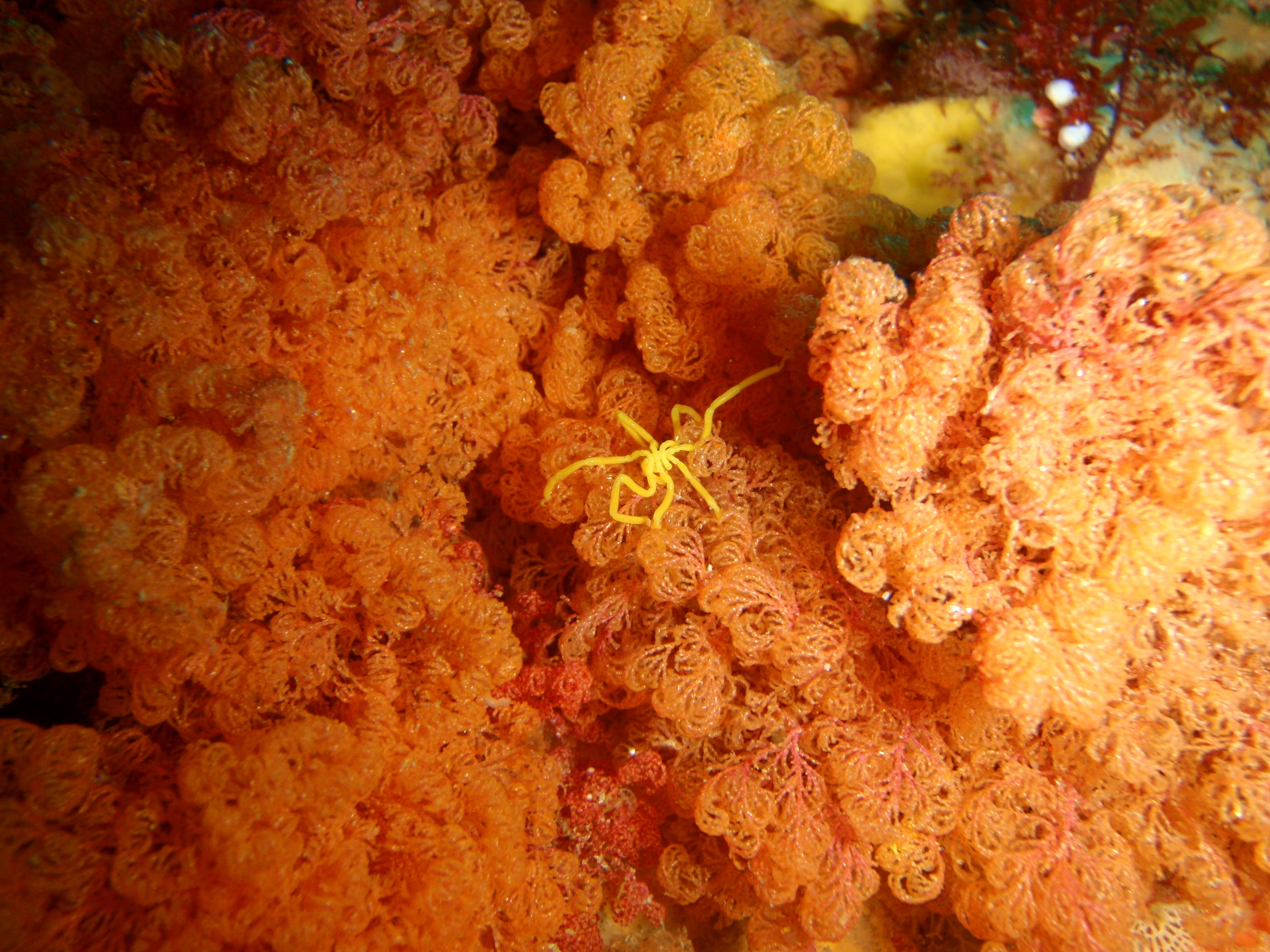
- Yellow sea spider Meridionale ambigua

Scientific classification
- Kingdom: Animalia
- Phylum: Arthropoda
- Subphylum: Chelicerata
- Class: Pycnogonida
- Order: Pantopoda
- Family: Callipallenidae
- Genus: Pseudopallene; Wilson, 1878

= Pseudopallene =

Genus of sea spiders

Pseudopallene is a genus of sea spider.

== Species ==
- Pseudopallene circularis (Goodsir, 1842)
- Pseudopallene constricta Arango & Brenneis, 2013
- Pseudopallene flava Arango & Brenneis, 2013
- Pseudopallene gracilis Arango & Brenneis, 2013
- Pseudopallene harrisi Arango & Brenneis, 2013
- Pseudopallene tasmania Arango & Brenneis, 2013
