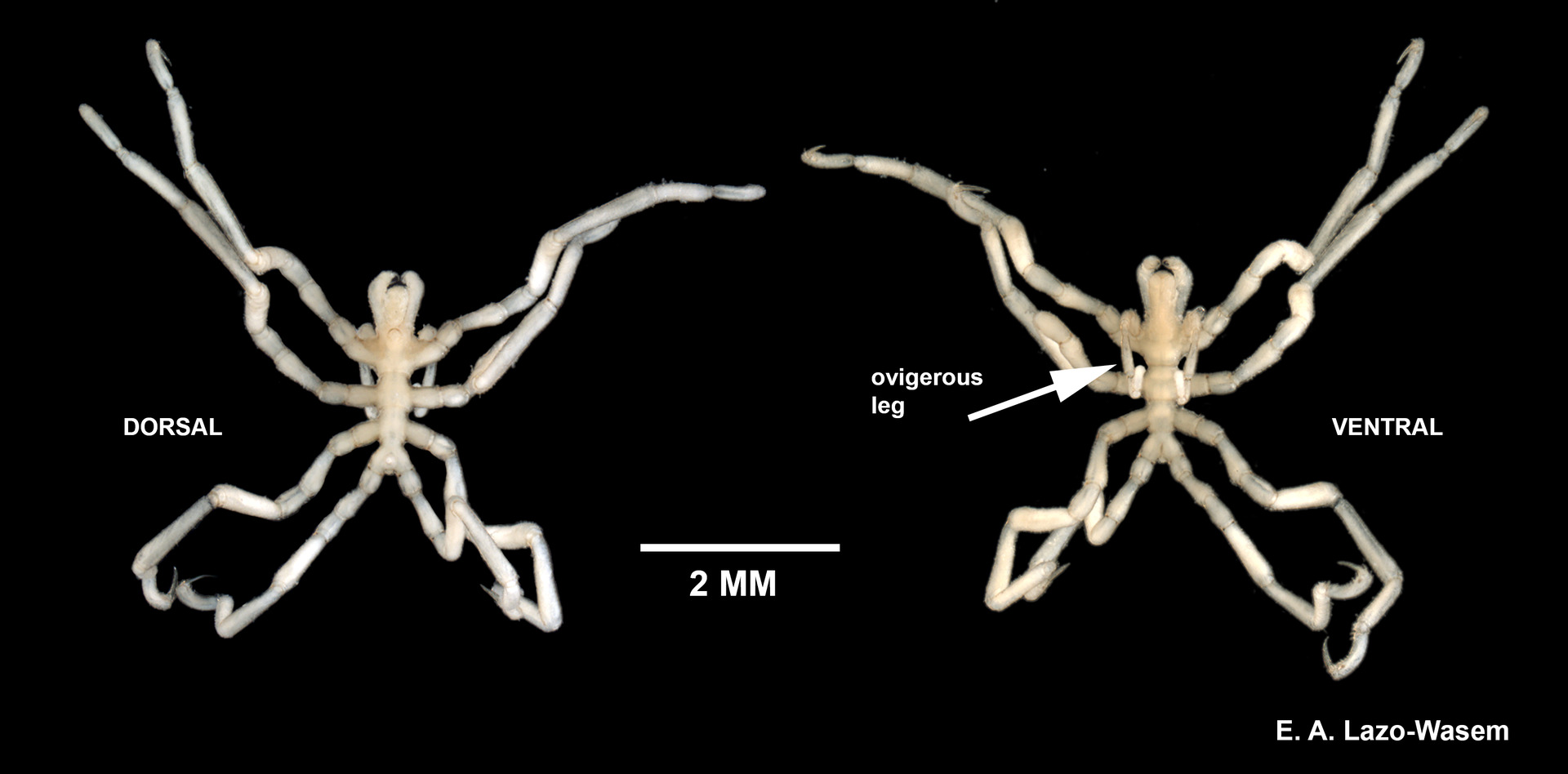
- Phoxichilidium femoratum

Scientific classification
- Kingdom: Animalia
- Phylum: Arthropoda
- Subphylum: Chelicerata
- Class: Pycnogonida
- Order: Pantopoda
- Suborder: Eupantopodida
- Superfamily: Phoxichilidoidea
- Family: Phoxichilidiidae

Genera
- Anoplodactylus; Phoxichilidium; Phoxiphilyra

Diversity
- 3 genera, c. 150 species

= Phoxichilidiidae =

Family of sea spiders

Phoxichilidiidae is a family of sea spiders. About 150 species are described, almost all in the genus Anoplodactylus Wilson, 1878.
