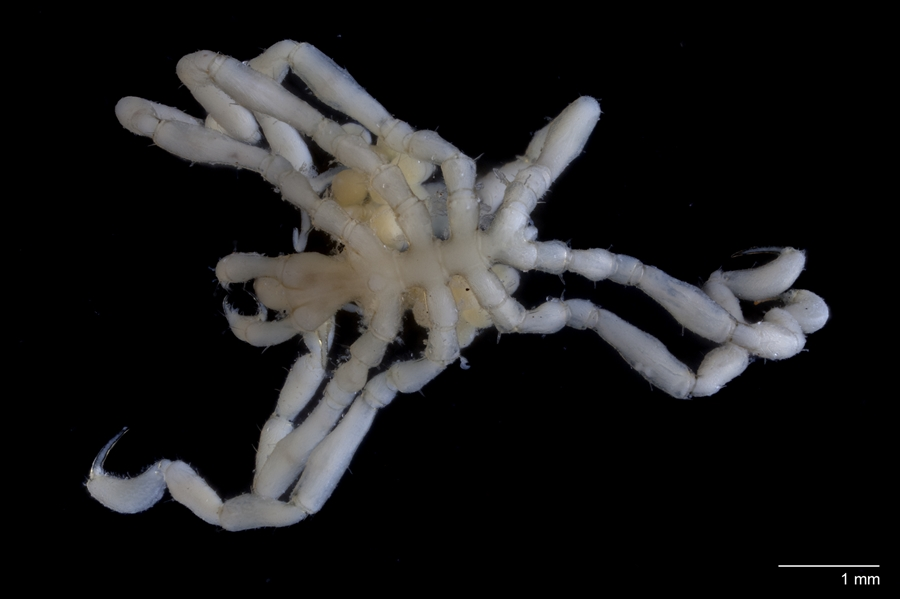
- Propallene vagus

Scientific classification
- Kingdom: Animalia
- Phylum: Arthropoda
- Subphylum: Chelicerata
- Class: Pycnogonida
- Order: Pantopoda
- Family: Callipallenidae; Flynn, 1929

= Callipallenidae =

Family of sea spiders

Callipallenidae is a family of sea spiders.

== Genera ==
- Austropallene
- Bathypallenopsis
- Callipallene
- Oropallene
- Pallenopsis
- Parapallene
- Propallene
- Pseudopallene
- Stylopallene

== See also ==
- Propallene longiceps
