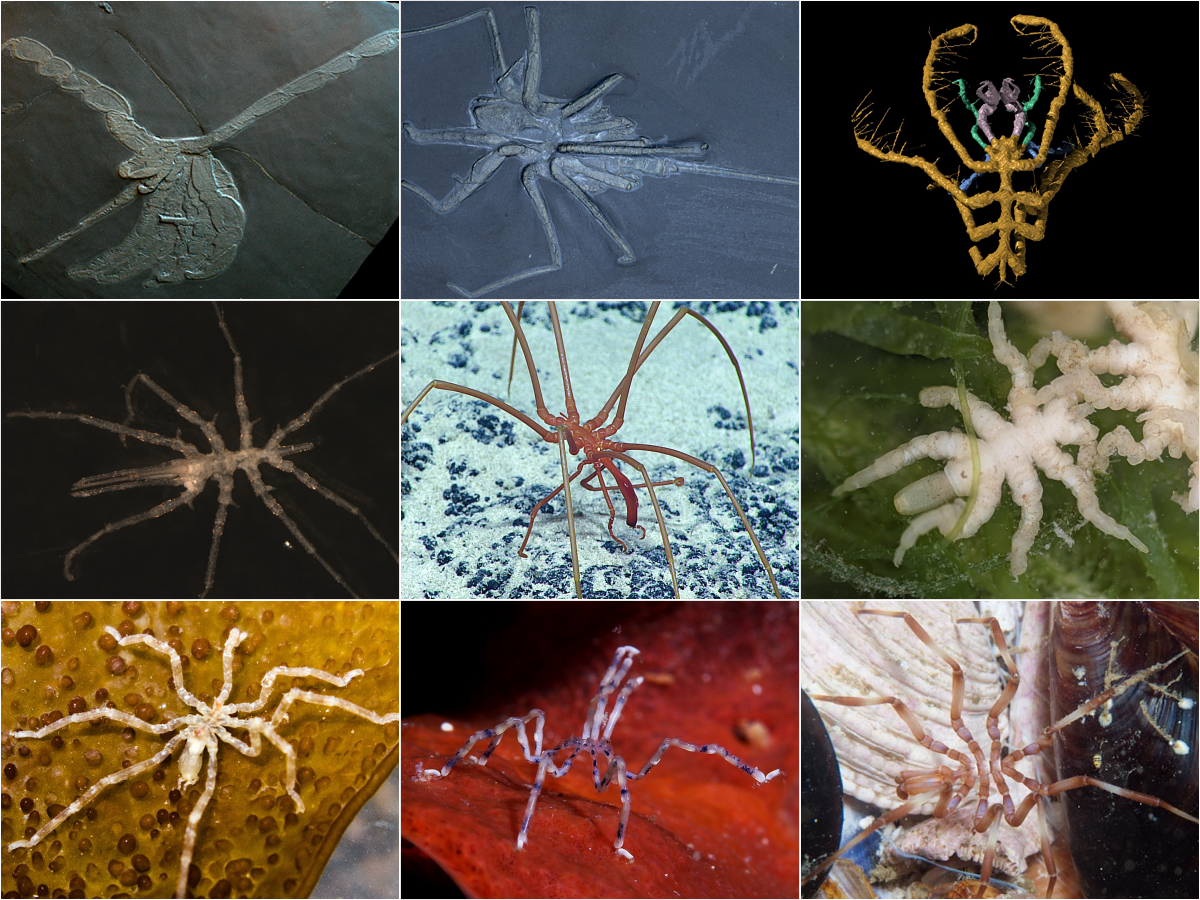

Scientific classification
- Kingdom: Animalia
- Phylum: Arthropoda
- Subphylum: Chelicerata; Latreille, 1810
- Class: Pycnogonida; Gerstaecker, 1863

Type genus
- Pycnogonum Brünnich, 1764

Orders and families
- See text

Synonyms
- Arachnopoda Dana, 1853

= Sea spider =

Sea spiders Temporal range: Late Cambrian–present

Class of marine arthropods

Sea spiders are marine arthropods of the class Pycnogonida, hence they are also called pycnogonids (/pɪkˈnɒɡənədz/; named after Pycnogonum, the type genus; with the suffix -id). The class includes the only extant order Pantopoda (lit. 'all feet'), alongside a few fossil species which could trace back to the early or mid-Paleozoic.

They are cosmopolitan, found in oceans around the world. The over 1,300 known species have leg spans ranging from 1 mm (0.04 in) to over 70 cm (2.3 ft). Most are toward the smaller end of this range in relatively shallow depths; however, they can grow to be quite large in the Antarctic region and in deep waters.

Despite their name and slight resemblance, "sea spiders" are not spiders, nor even arachnids. While some literature around the 2000s suggests they may be a sister group to all other living arthropods, their traditional classification as a member of chelicerates alongside horseshoe crabs and arachnids has regained wide support in subsequent studies.

== Morphology ==
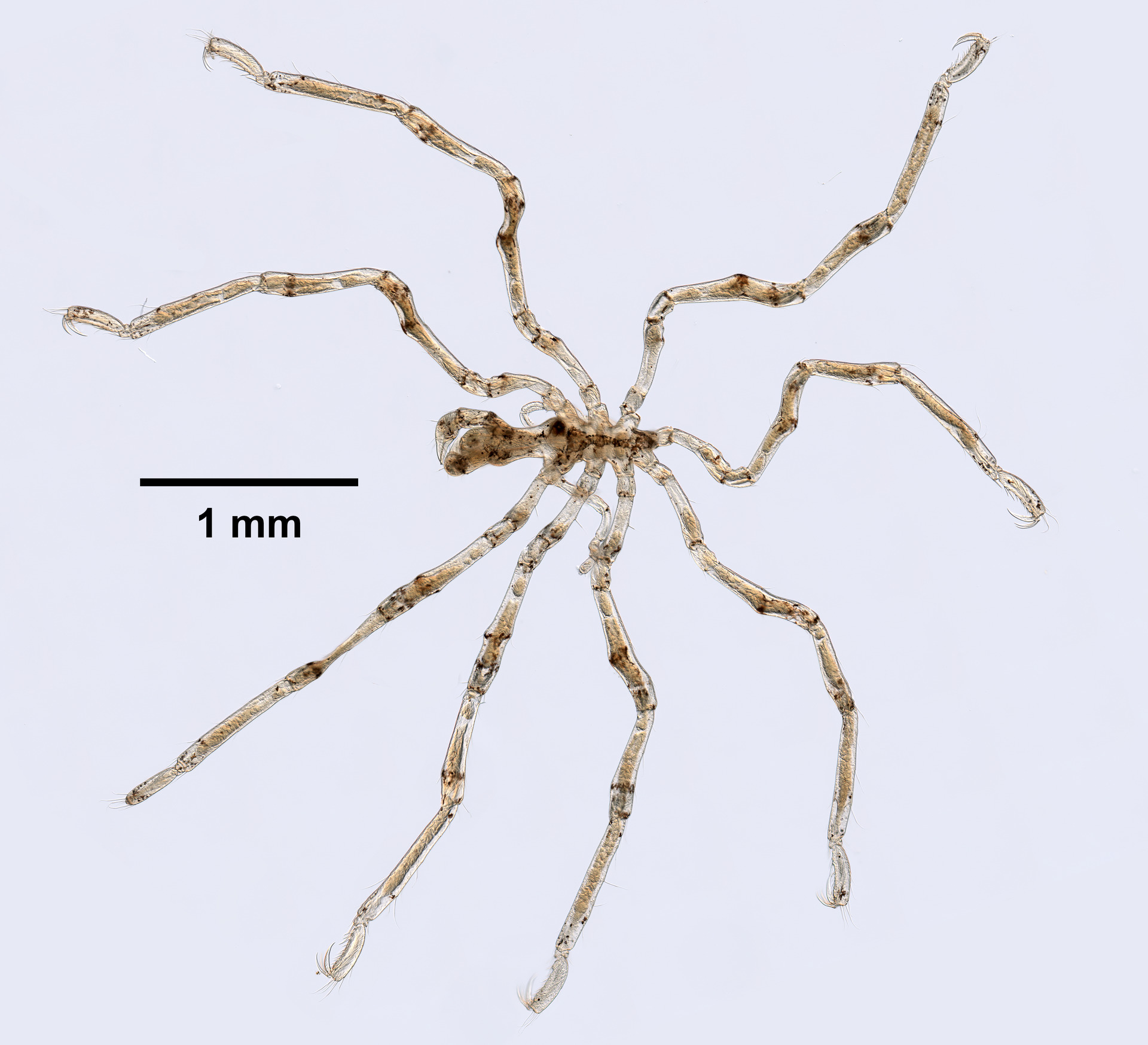
Callipallene brevirostris

Many sea spiders are recognised by their enormous walking legs in contrast to a reduced body region, resulting into the so-called "all legs" or "no body" appearance. The body segments (somites) are generally interpreted as three main sections (tagma): cephalon (head, aka cephalosoma), trunk (aka thorax) and abdomen. However, the definition of cephalon and trunk might differ between literature (see text), and some studies might follow a prosoma (i.e. cephalon and trunk)–opisthosoma (i.e. abdomen) definition, aligning to the tagmosis of other chelicerates. The exoskeleton of the body is tube-like, lacking the dorsoventral division (tergite and sternite) seen in most other arthropods.

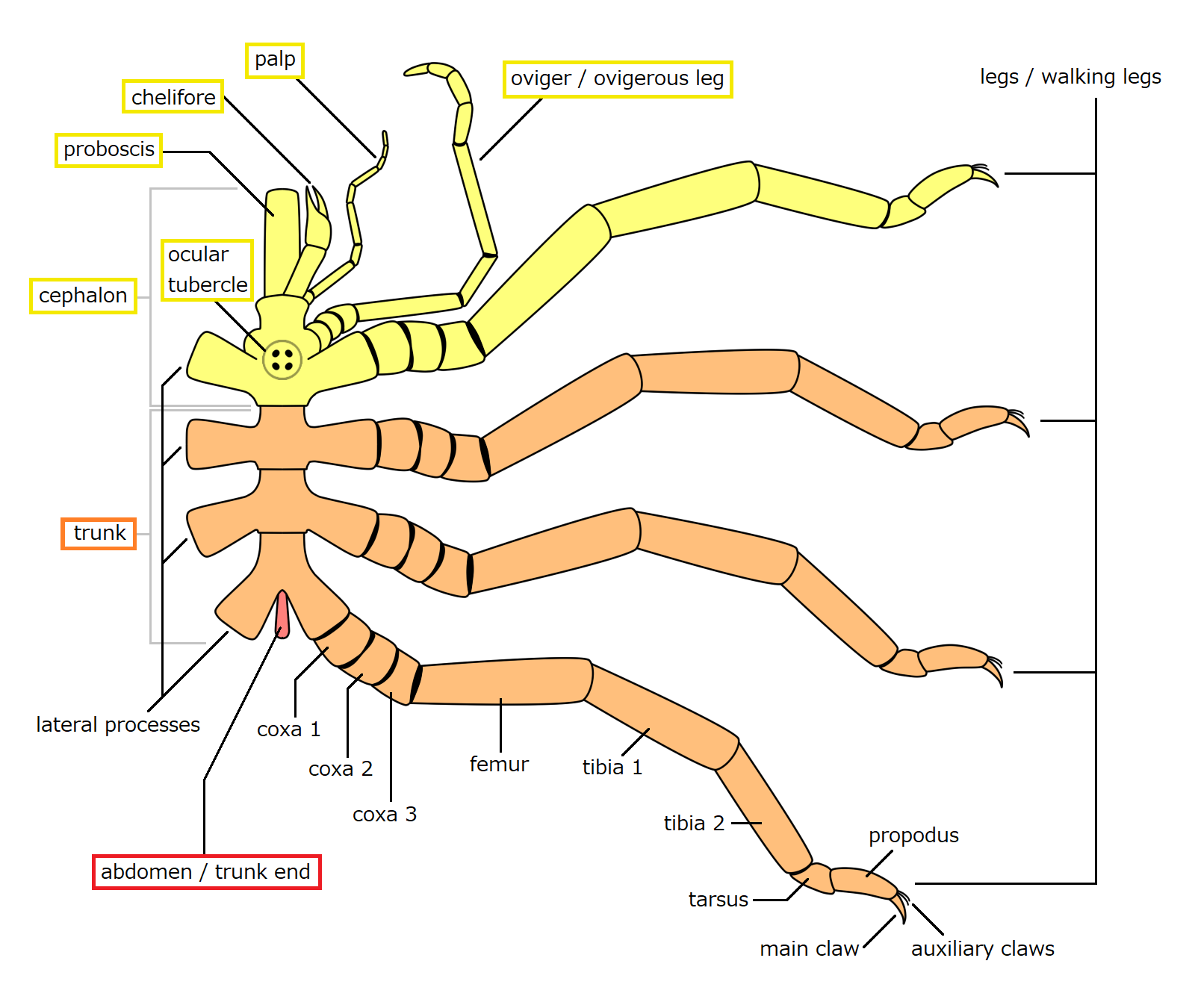
Generalized morphology of a pantopod pycnogonid

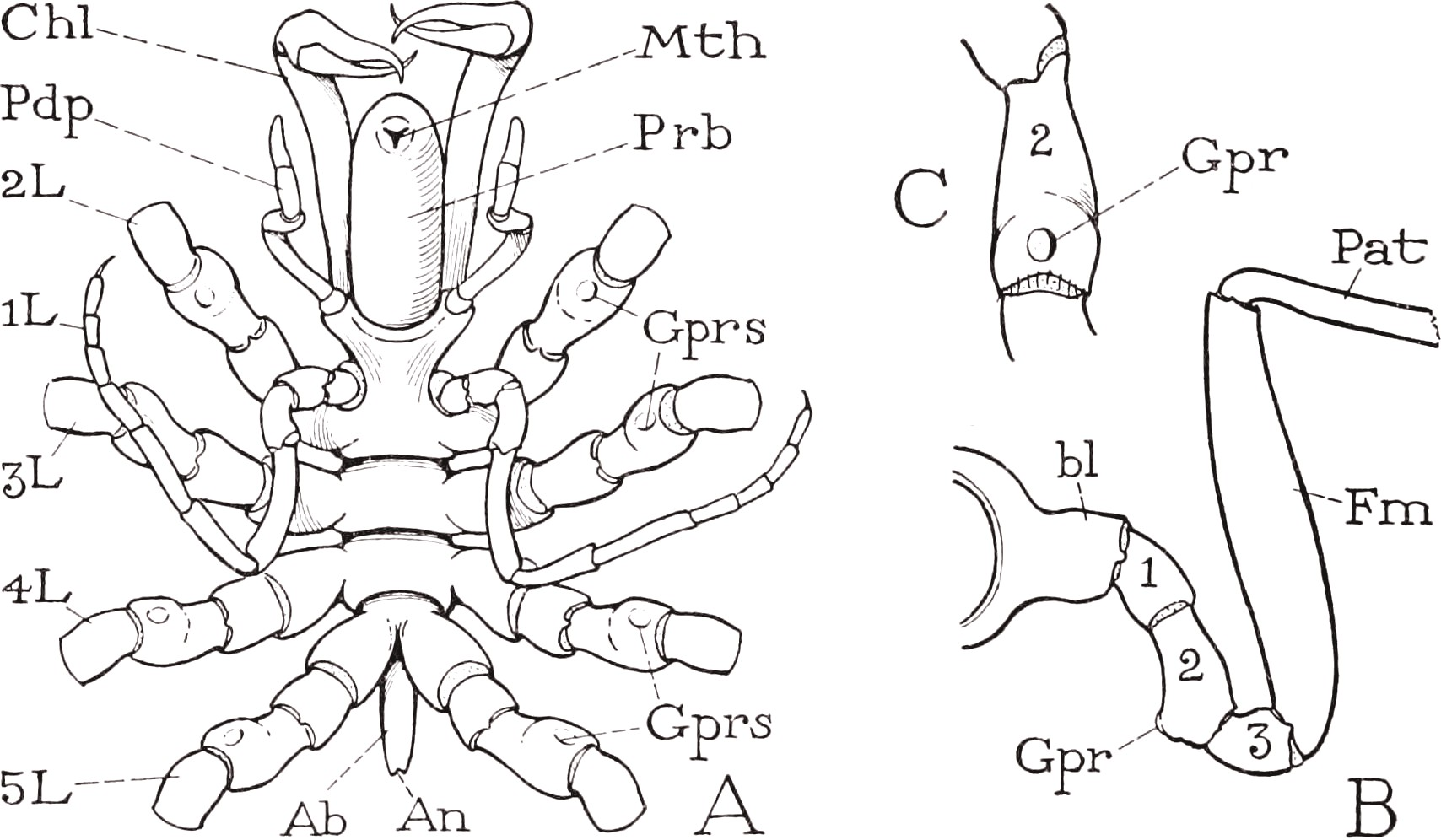
Ventral view and leg base of Chaetonymphon spinosum

The cephalon is formed by the fusion of ocular somite and four anterior segments behind it (somite 1–4). It consists of an anterior proboscis, a dorsal ocular tubercle with eyes, and up to four pairs of appendages (chelifores, palps, ovigers and first walking legs). Although some literature might consider the segment carrying the first walking leg (somite 4) to be part of the trunk, it is completely fused to the remaining head section to form a single cephalic tagma. The proboscis has three-fold symmetry, terminating with a typically Y-shaped mouth (vertical slit in Austrodecidae). It usually has fairly limited dorsoventral and lateral movement. However, in those species that have reduced chelifores and palps, the proboscis is well developed and flexible, often equipped with numerous sensory bristles and strong rasping ridges around the mouth. The proboscis is unique to pycnogonids, and its exact homology with other arthropod mouthparts is enigmatic, as well as its relationship with the absence of labrum (preoral upper lip of ocular somite) in pycnogonid itself. The ocular tubercle has up to two pairs of simple eyes (ocelli) on it, though sometimes the eyes can be reduced or missing, especially among species living in the deep oceans. All of the eyes are median eyes in origin, homologous to the median ocelli of other arthropods, while the lateral eyes (e.g. compound eyes) found in most other arthropods are completely absent.

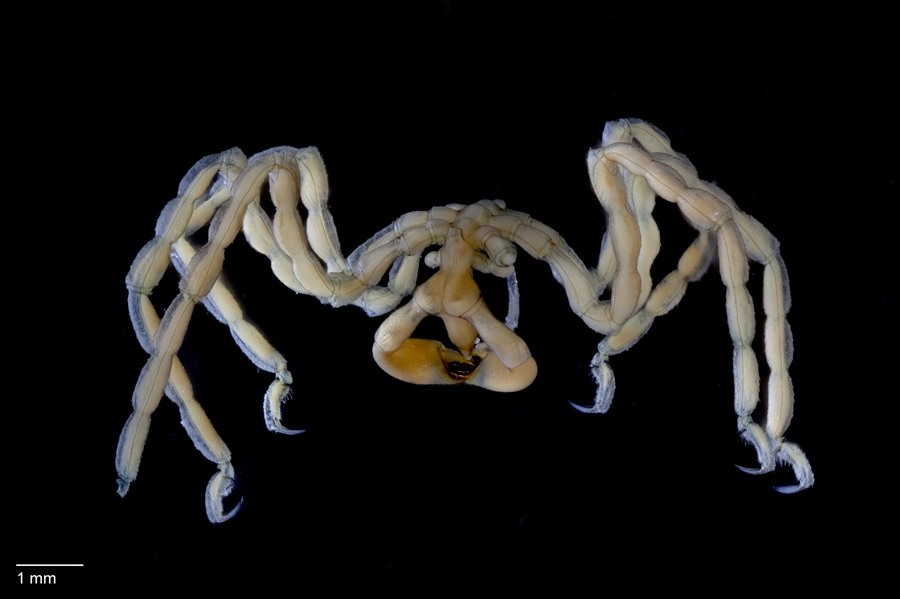
Pseudopallene pachycheira, showing robust chelifores and the absence of palps.

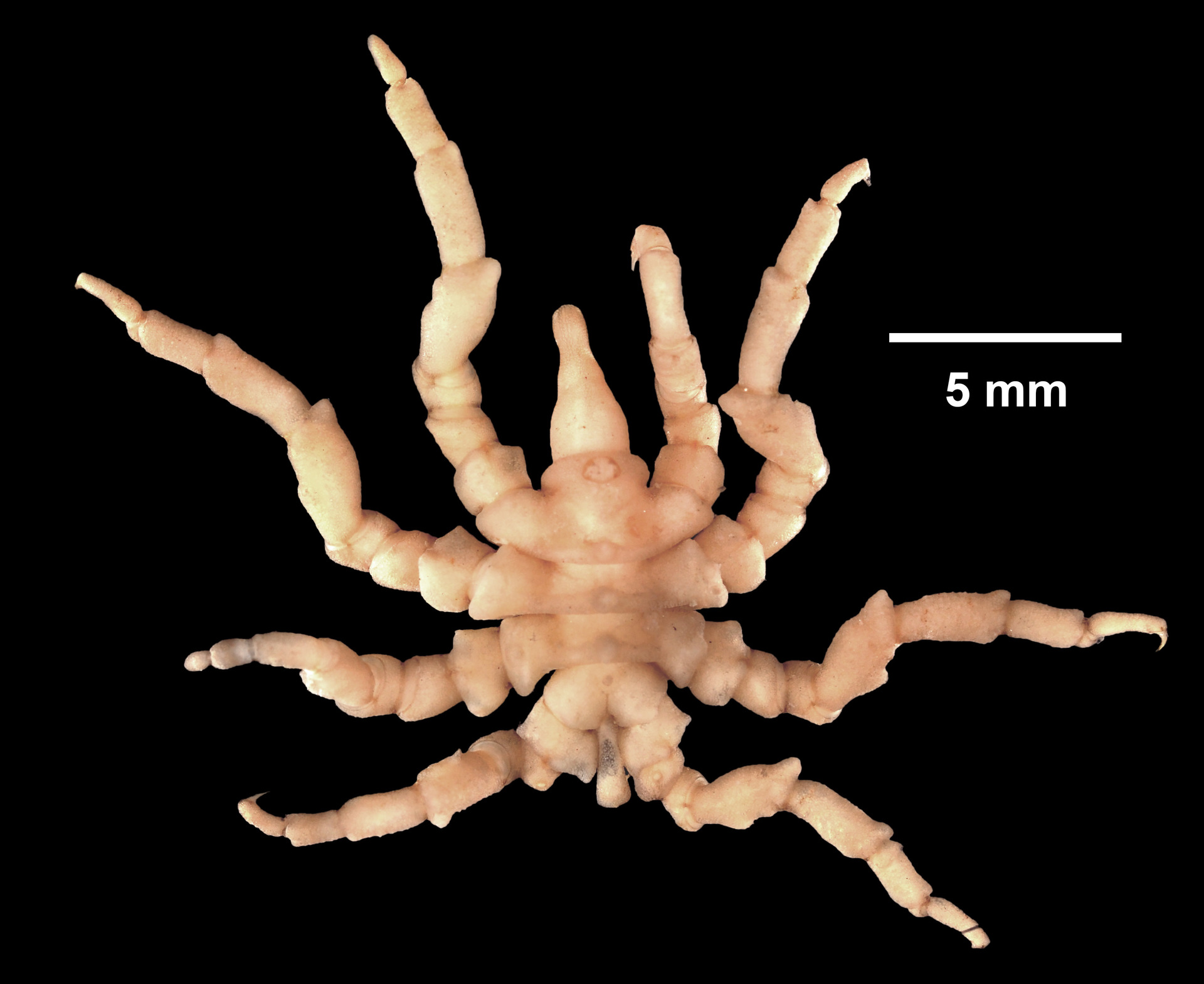
Pycnogonum litorale, showing the absence of both chelifores and palps. Ovigers are absent in female.

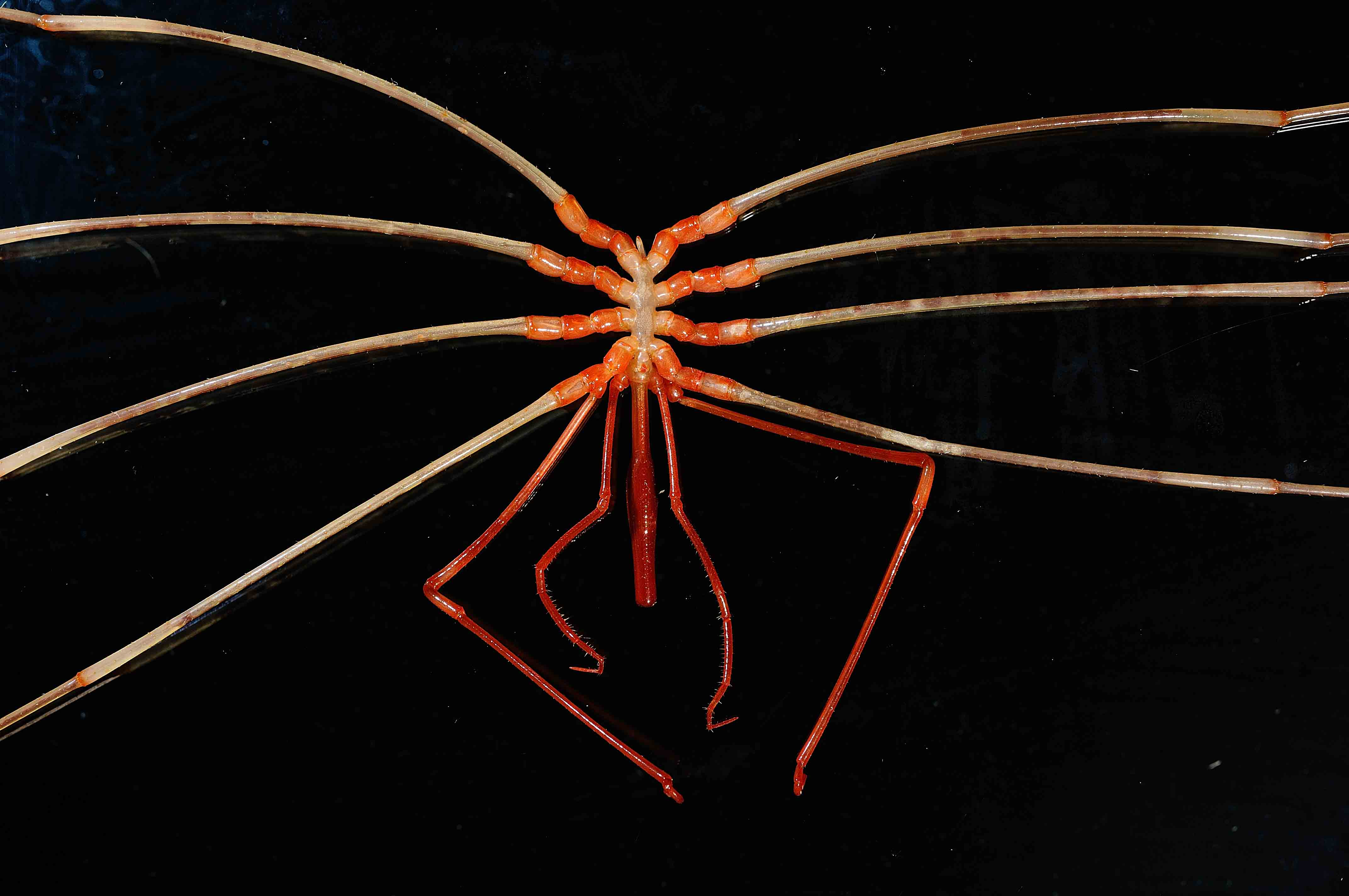
Colossendeis sp., showing the absence of chelifores but otherwise elongated proboscis, palps and ovigers.

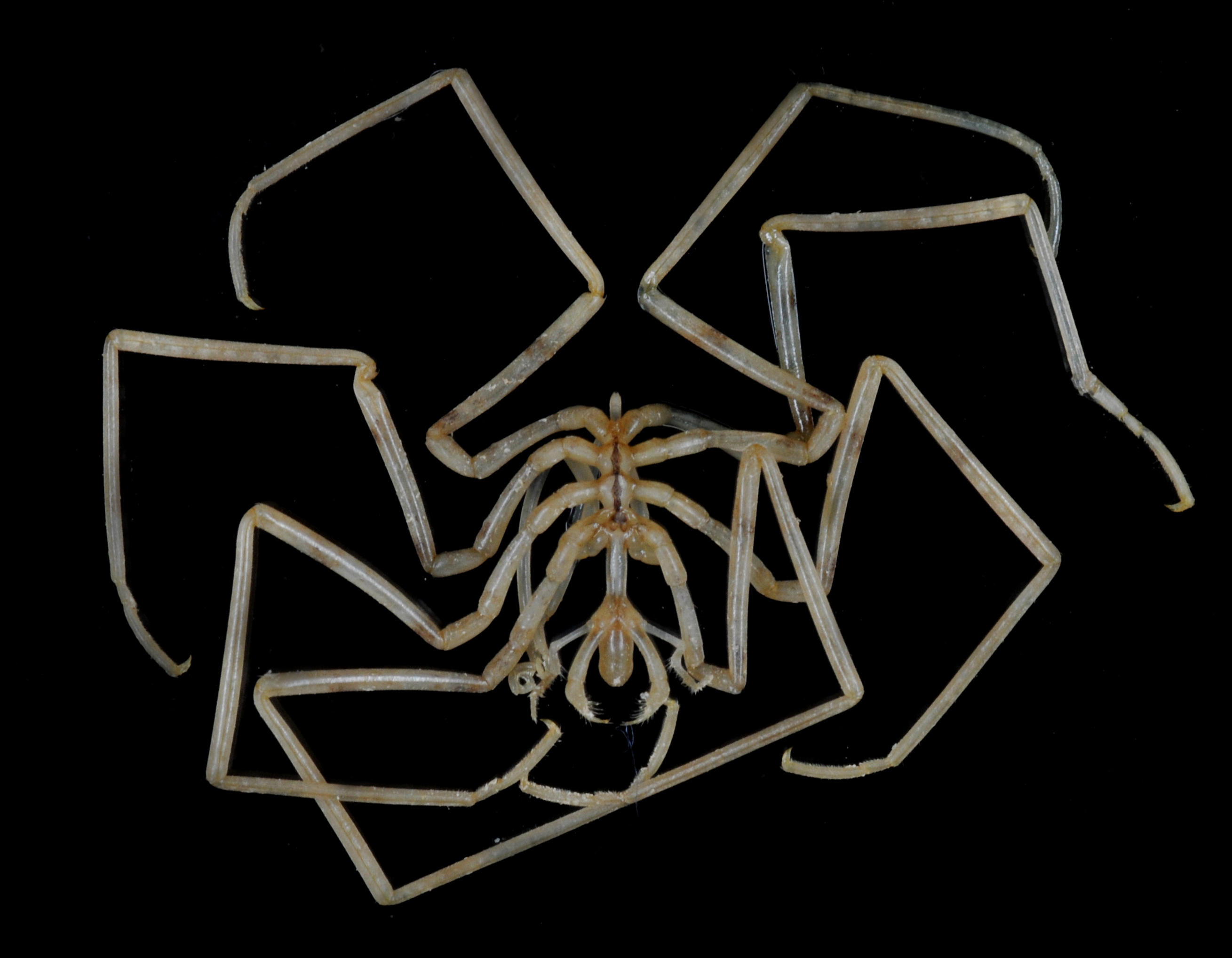
Nymphon maculatum, showing the presence of both chelifores, palps and ovigers.

In adult pycnogonids, the chelifores (aka cheliphore), palps and ovigers (aka ovigerous legs) are variably reduced or absent, depending on taxa and sometimes sex. Nymphonidae is the only family where all of three pairs are always functional. The ovigers can be reduced or missing in females, but are present in almost all males. In a functional condition, the chelifores terminate with a pincer (chela) formed by two segments (podomeres), like the chelicerae of most other chelicerates. The scape (peduncle) behind the pincer is usually unsegmented, but could be bisegmented in some species, resulting into a total of three or four chelifore segments. The palps and ovigers have up to 9 and 10 segments respectively, but can have fewer even when in a functional condition. The palps are rather featureless and never have claws in adult Pantopoda, while the ovigers may or may not possess a terminal claw and rows of specialised spines on its curved distal segments (strigilis). The chelifores are used for feeding and the palps are used for sensing and manipulating food items, while the ovigers are used for cleaning themselves, with the additional function of carrying offspring in males.

Conditions of chelifores, palps, and ovigers by family
appendages families	chelifores	palps	ovigers
Austrodecidae	absent	functional	functional (absent in some Austrodecus males)
Rhynchothoracidae	absent	functional	functional
Pycnogonidae	absent	absent	absent in females (also in Nulloviger males)
Colossendeidae	absent (functional in polymerous genera)	functional	functional
Endeidae	absent	absent	absent in females
Phoxichilidiidae	functional	absent	absent in females
Pallenopsidae	functional	reduced	functional
Ammotheidae	reduced	functional	functional
Ascorhynchidae	reduced	functional	functional
Callipallenidae	functional	absent (functional in some males)	functional
Nymphonidae	functional	functional	functional

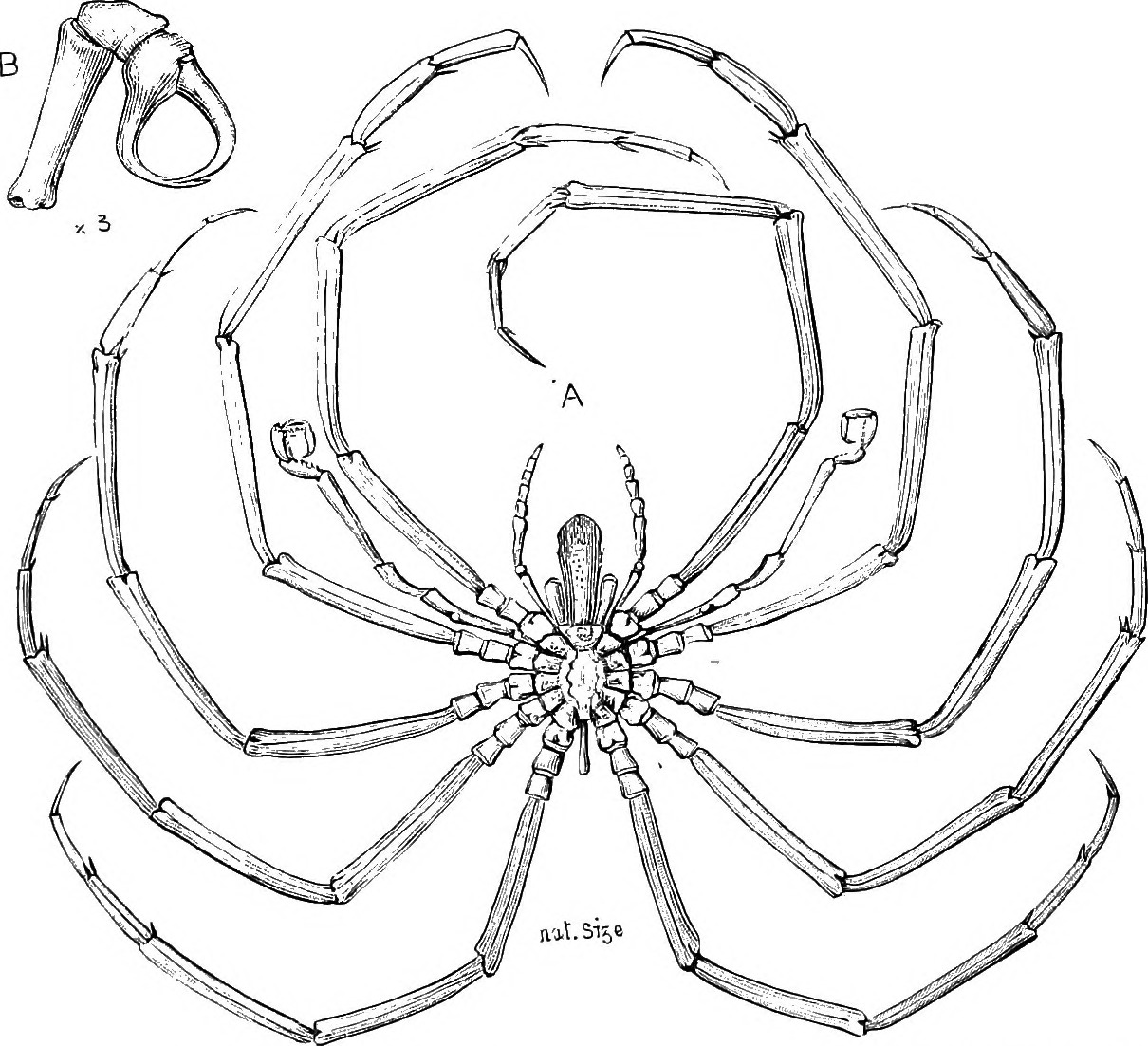
Decolopoda australis, showing 10 legs and four-segmented chelifores (upper left).

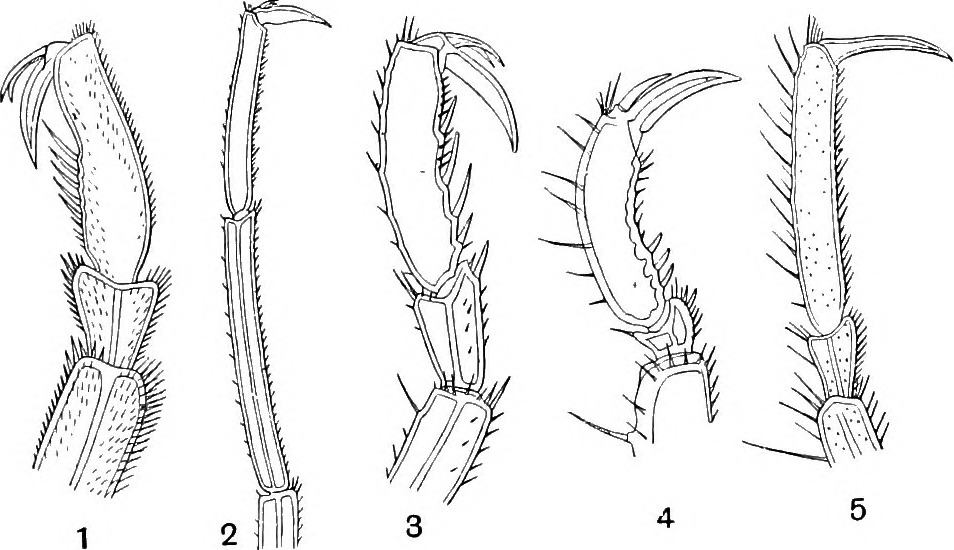
Tibia 2 (distal portion), tarsus, propodus and claws of various pantopod pycnogonids.

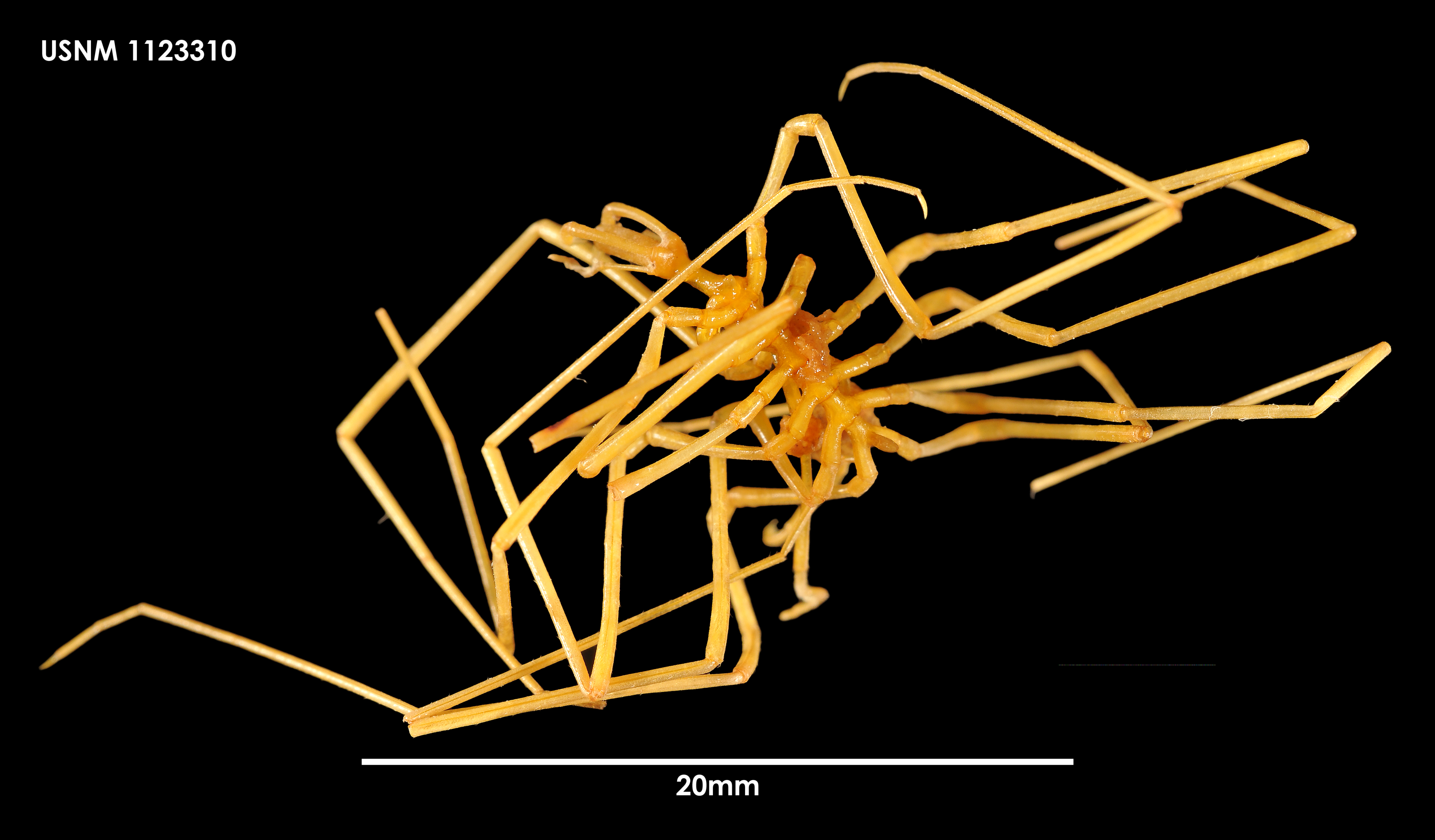
Sexanymphon mirabilis, a species with six pairs of legs

The leg-bearing somites (somite 4 and all trunk somites, the alternatively defined "trunk/thorax") are either segmented or fused to each other, carrying the walking legs via a series of lateral processes (lateral tubular extension of the somites). In most species, the legs are much larger than the body in both length and volume, only being shorter and more slender than the body in Rhynchothoracidae. Each leg is typically composed of eight tubular segments, commonly known as coxa 1, 2 and 3, femur, tibia 1 and 2, tarsus, and propodus. This terminology, with three coxae, no trochanter, and using the term "propodus", is unusual for arthropods. However, based on muscular system and serial homology to the podomeres of other chelicerates, they are most likely coxa (i.e. coxa 1), trochanter (i.e. coxa 2), prefemur/basifemur (i.e. coxa 3), postfemur/telofemur (i.e. femur), patella (i.e. tibia 1), tibia (tibia 2) and two tarsomeres (i.e. tarsus and propodus) in origin. The leg segmentation of Paleozoic taxa is a bit different, noticeably they have annulated coxa 1 and are further divided into two types: one with flattened distal (femur and beyond) segments and first leg pair with one less segment than the other leg pairs (e.g. Palaeoisopus, Haliestes), and another one with an immobile joint between the apparently fourth and fifth segment which altogether might represent a divided femur (e.g. Palaeopantopus, Flagellopantopus). Each leg terminates with a main claw (aka pretarsus/apotele, the true terminal segment), which may or may not have a pair of auxiliary claws on its base. Most of the joints move vertically, except the joint between coxa 1–2 (coxa-trochanter joint) which provide lateral mobility (promotor-remotor motion), and the joint between tarsus and propodus did not have muscles, just like the subdivided tarsus of other arthropods. Adults usually have eight legs (four pairs) in total, but in a few species, adults have five to six pairs. These are known as polymerous (i.e., extra-legged) species, which are distributed among six genera in the families Pycnogonidae (five pairs in Pentapycnon), Colossendeidae (five pairs in Decolopoda and Pentacolossendeis, six pairs in Dodecolopoda) and Nymphonidae (five pairs in Pentanymphon, six pairs in Sexanymphon).

Several alternatives had been proposed for the position homology of pycnogonid appendages, such as chelifores being protocerebral/homologous to the labrum (see text) or ovigers being duplicated palps. Conclusively, the classic, morphology-based one-by-one alignment to the prosomal appendages of other chelicerates was confirmed by both neuroanatomic and genetic evidences. Noticeably, the order of pycnogonid leg pairs are mismatched to those of other chelicerates, starting from the ovigers which are homologous to the first leg pair of arachnids. While the fourth walking leg pair was considered aligned to the variably reduced first opisthosomal segment (somite 7, also counted as part of the prosoma based on different studies and/or taxa) of euchelicerates, the origin of the additional fifth and sixth leg pairs in the polymerous species are still enigmatic. Together with the cephalic position of the first walking legs, the anterior and posterior boundary of pycnogonid leg pairs are not aligned to those of euchelicerate prosoma and opisthosoma, nor the cephalon and trunk of pycnogonid itself.

somites taxa	0 (ocular somite)	1	2	3	4	5	6	7
Euchelicerates	labrum	chelicerae	pedipalps	leg 1	leg 2	leg 3	leg 4	chilarium in horseshoe crabs, appendage absent in arachnids
Pycnogonids	?	chelifores	palps	ovigers	leg 1	leg 2	leg 3	leg 4

The abdomen (aka trunk end) does not have any appendages. In Pantopoda it is also called the anal tubercle, which is always unsegmented, highly reduced and almost vestigial, simply terminated by the anus. It is generally considered to be a remnant of opisthosoma/trunk of other chelicerates, but it is unknown which somite(s) it actually aligned to. Alternatively, the anal tubercle might be a telson (tail) instead of any opisthosomal somites. So far only Paleozoic species have segmented abdomens (at least up to four segments, presumably somite 8–11 which aligned to opisthosomal segment 2–5 of euchelicerates), with some of them even terminated by a long, unambiguous telson.

== Internal anatomy and physiology ==
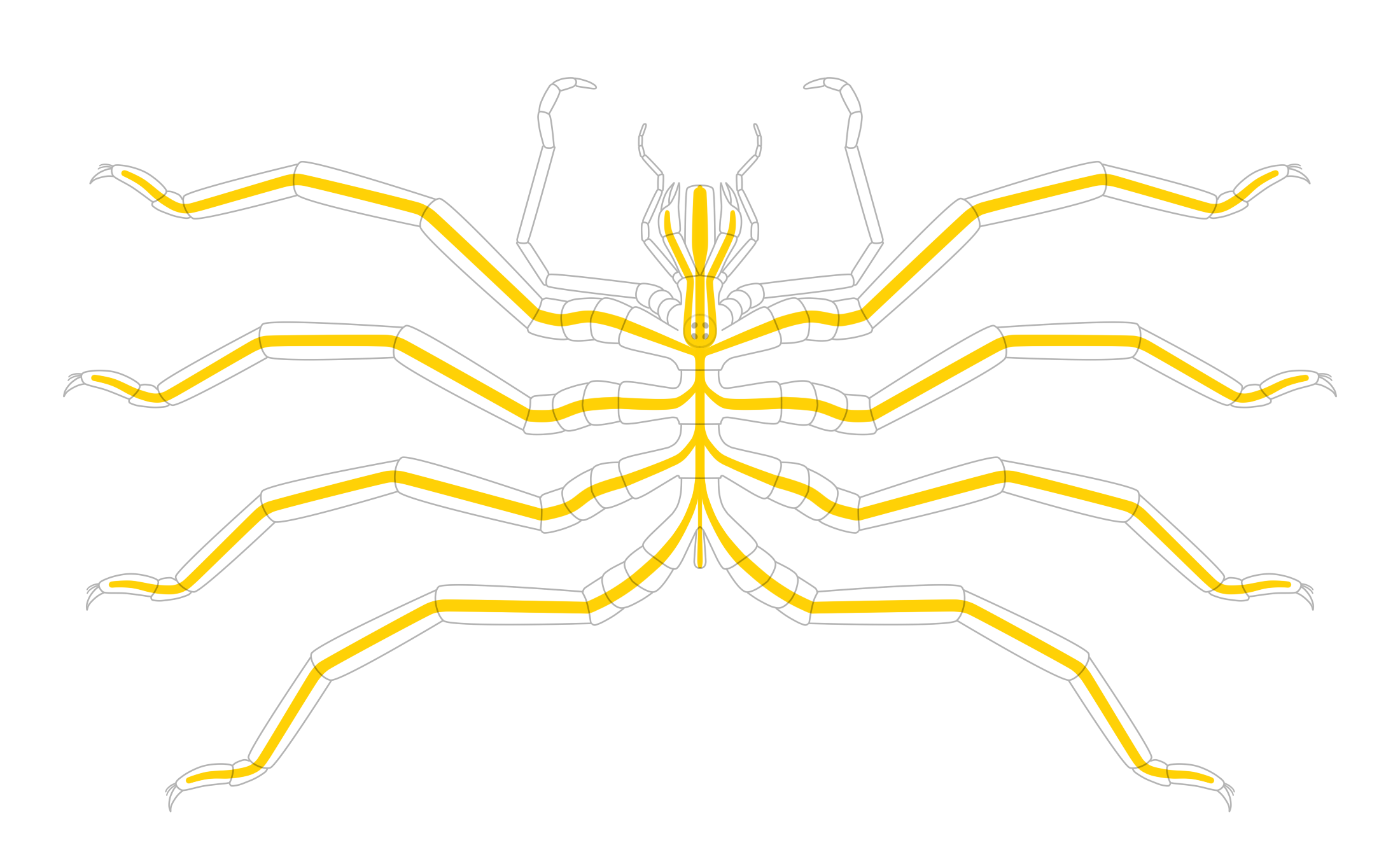
Digestive tract (yellow highlight) of a pantopod pycnogonid

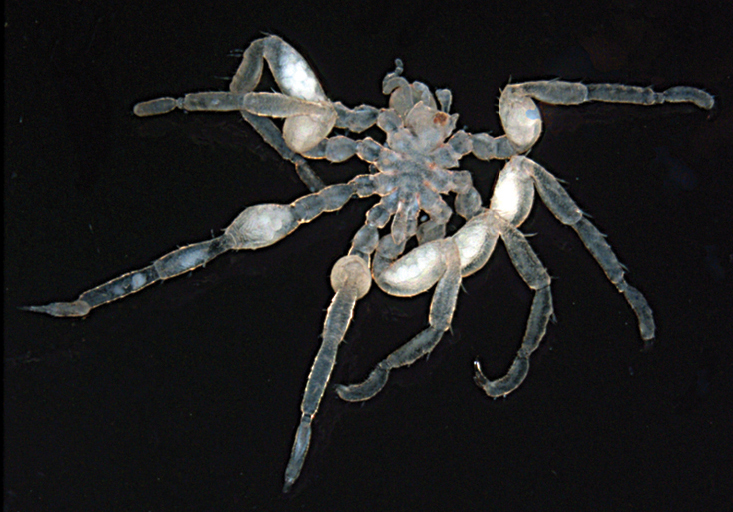
Female Ammothella longipes with pedal gonads full of eggs

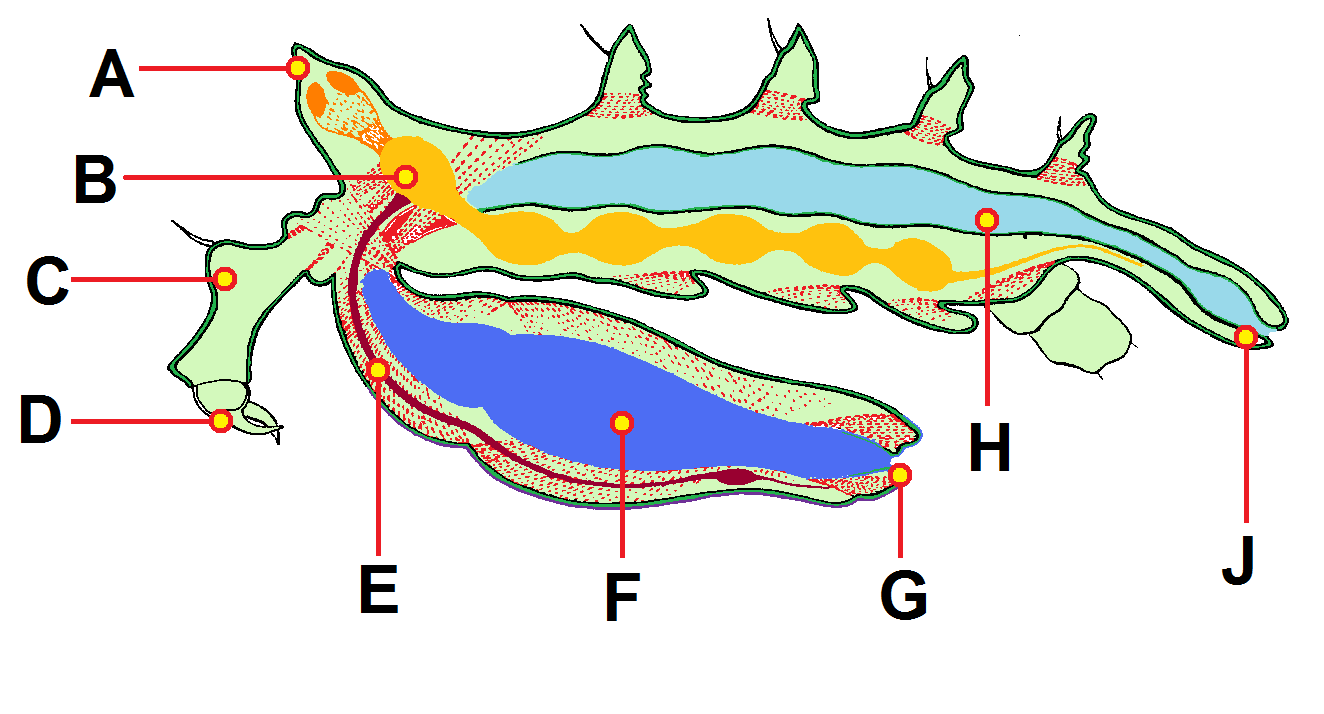
Sagittal section of an ascorhynchid pycnogonid, showing pharynx (F), mid gut (H) and central nervous system (B).

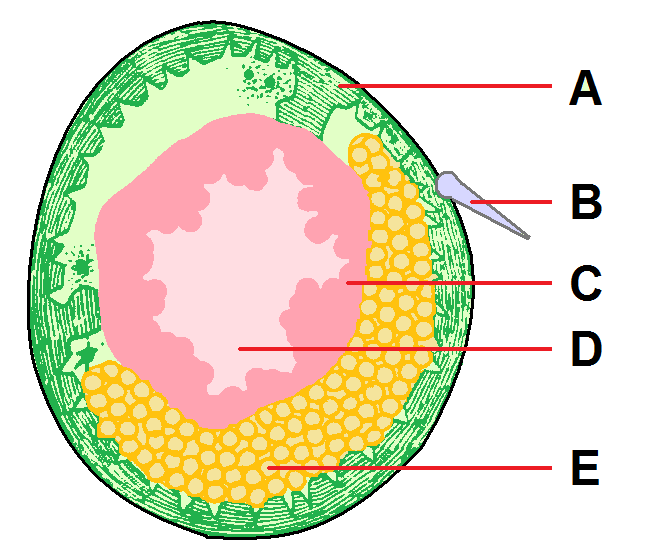
Transverse section of a pycnogonid leg, showing gut diverticulum (C, D) and gonad (E)

A striking feature of pycnogonid anatomy is the distribution of their digestive and reproductive systems. The pharynx inside the proboscis is lined by dense setae, which is possibly related to their feeding behaviour. A pair of gonads (ovaries in female, testes in male) is located dorsally in relation to the digestive tract, but the majority of these organs are branched diverticula throughout the legs because the body is too small to accommodate all of them alone. The midgut diverticula are very long, usually reaching beyond the femur (variably down to tibia 2, tarsus or propodus) of each leg, except in Rhynchothoracidae where they only reach coxa 1. Some species have additional branches (in some Pycnogonum) or irregular pouches (in Endeis) on the diverticula. There is also a pair of anterior diverticula which corresponds to the chelifores or is inserted into the proboscis in some chelifores-less species. The palps and ovigers never contain diverticula, although some might possess a pair of small diverticula near the bases of these appendages. The gonad diverticula (pedal gonad) reach each femur and open via a gonopore located at coxa 2. The structure and number of the gonopores might differ between sexes (e.g. larger in female, variably absent at the anterior legs of some male). In males, the femur or both femur and tibia 1 possess cement glands.

Pycnogonids do not require a traditional respiratory system (e.g. gills). Instead, gasses are absorbed by the legs via the non-calcareous, porous exoskeleton and transferred through the body by diffusion. The morphology of pycnogonid creates an efficient surface-area-to-volume ratio for respiration to occur through direct diffusion. Oxygen is absorbed by the legs and is transported via the hemolymph to the rest of the body with an open circulatory system. The small, long, thin pycnogonid heart beats vigorously at 90 to 180 beats per minute, creating substantial blood pressure. The beating of the heart drives circulation in the trunk and in the part of the legs closest to the trunk, but is not important for the circulation in the rest of the legs. Hemolymph circulation in the legs is mostly driven by the peristaltic movement of the gut diverticula that extend into every leg, a process called gut peristalsis. In the case of taxa without a heart (e.g. Pycnogonidae), the whole circulatory system is presumed to be solely maintained by gut peristalsis.

The central nervous system of pycnogonid largely retains a segmented ladder-like structure. It consists of a dorsal brain (supraesophageal ganglion) and a pair of ventral nerve cords, intercepted by the esophagus. The former is a fusion of the first and second brain segments (cerebral ganglia)—protocerebrum and deutocerebrum—corresponding to the eyes/ocular somite and chelifores/somite 1 respectively. The whole section was rotated during pycnogonid evolution, as the protocerebrum went upward and the deutocerebrum shifted forward. The third commissure is established inferior to the esophagus. This third brain segment, or tritocerebrum (corresponding to the palps/somite 2), is fused to the oviger/somite 3 ganglia instead, which is followed up by the final ovigeral somata in the protonymphon larva of Pycnogonum litorale. A series of leg ganglia (somite 4 and so on) develop as molts progress, with incorporation of the first leg ganglia into the subesophageal ganglia in certain taxa. The leg ganglia might shift anteriorly or even cluster together, but are never highly fused into the ring-like synganglion of other chelicerates. The abdominal ganglia are vestigal, absorbed by the preceding leg ganglia during juvenile development.

== Distribution and ecology ==
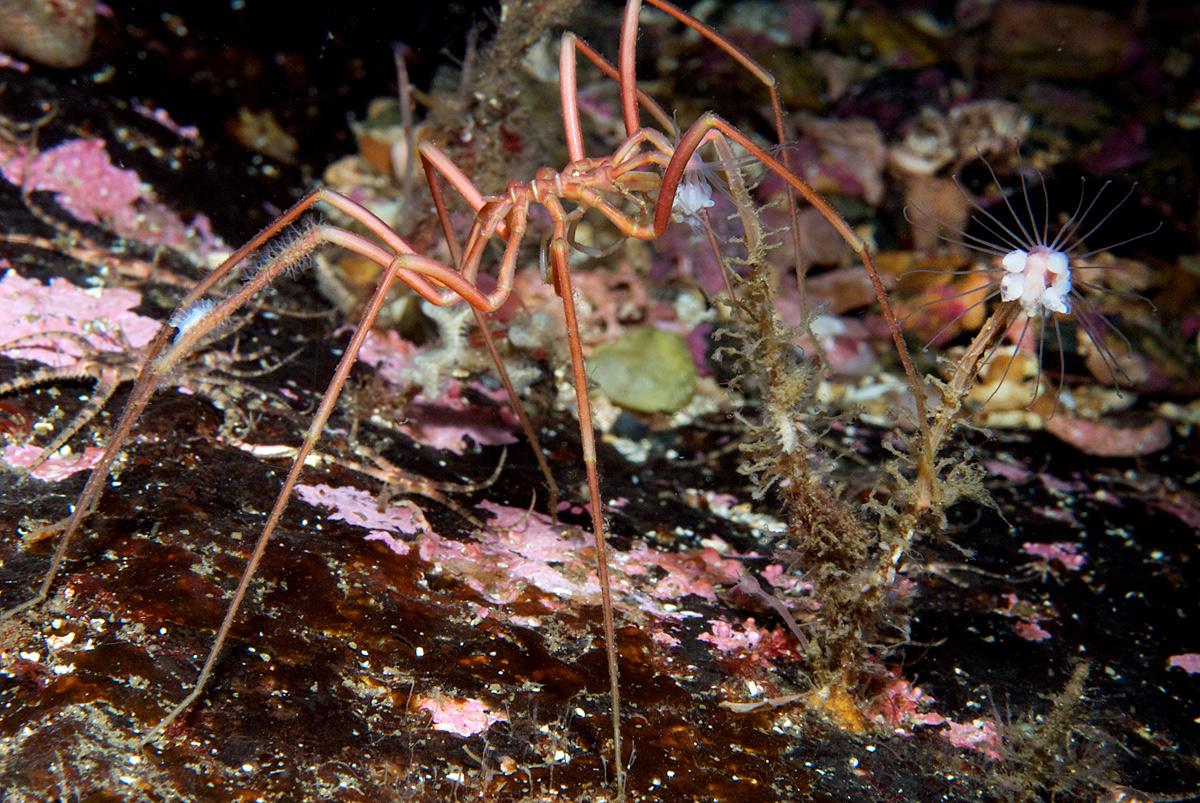
Nymphon leptocheles grazing on a hydroid

Sea spiders live in many different oceanic regions of the world, from Australia, New Zealand, and the Pacific coast of the United States, to the Mediterranean Sea and the Caribbean Sea, to the north and south poles. They are most common in shallow waters, but can be found as deep as 7,000 metres (23,000 ft), and live in both marine and estuarine habitats. Pycnogonids are well camouflaged beneath the rocks and among the algae that are found along shorelines.

Sea spiders are benthic in general, using their stilt-like legs to walk along the bottom, but they are also capable of swimming by using an umbrella pulsing motion, and some Paleozoic species with flatter legs might have even had a nektonic lifestyle. Sea spiders are mostly carnivorous predators or scavengers that feed on soft-bodied invertebrates such as cnidarians, sponges, polychaetes, and bryozoans, by inserting their proboscis into targeted prey. Although they are known to feed on sea anemones, most sea anemones survive this ordeal, making the sea spider a parasite rather than a predator of sea anemones. A few species such as Nymphonella tapetis are specialized endoparasites of bivalve mollusks. Some species in the genus Sericosura are known to farm and consume methylotrophic bacteria on their exoskeletons.

Not much is known about the primary predators of sea spiders, if any. At least some species have obvious defensive methods such as amputating and regenerating their legs, or being distasteful via high levels of ecdysteroids (ecdysis hormone). In Pycnogonum litorale, the juveniles can regrow their posterior body section after being cut off, an ability which was thought to be absent in ecdysozoans. On the other hand, some parasites of sea spiders are known, including gastropod mollusks or hitch‐rided by sessile animals such as goose barnacles, which may negatively affect their locomotion and respiratory efficiency.

=== Reproduction and development ===
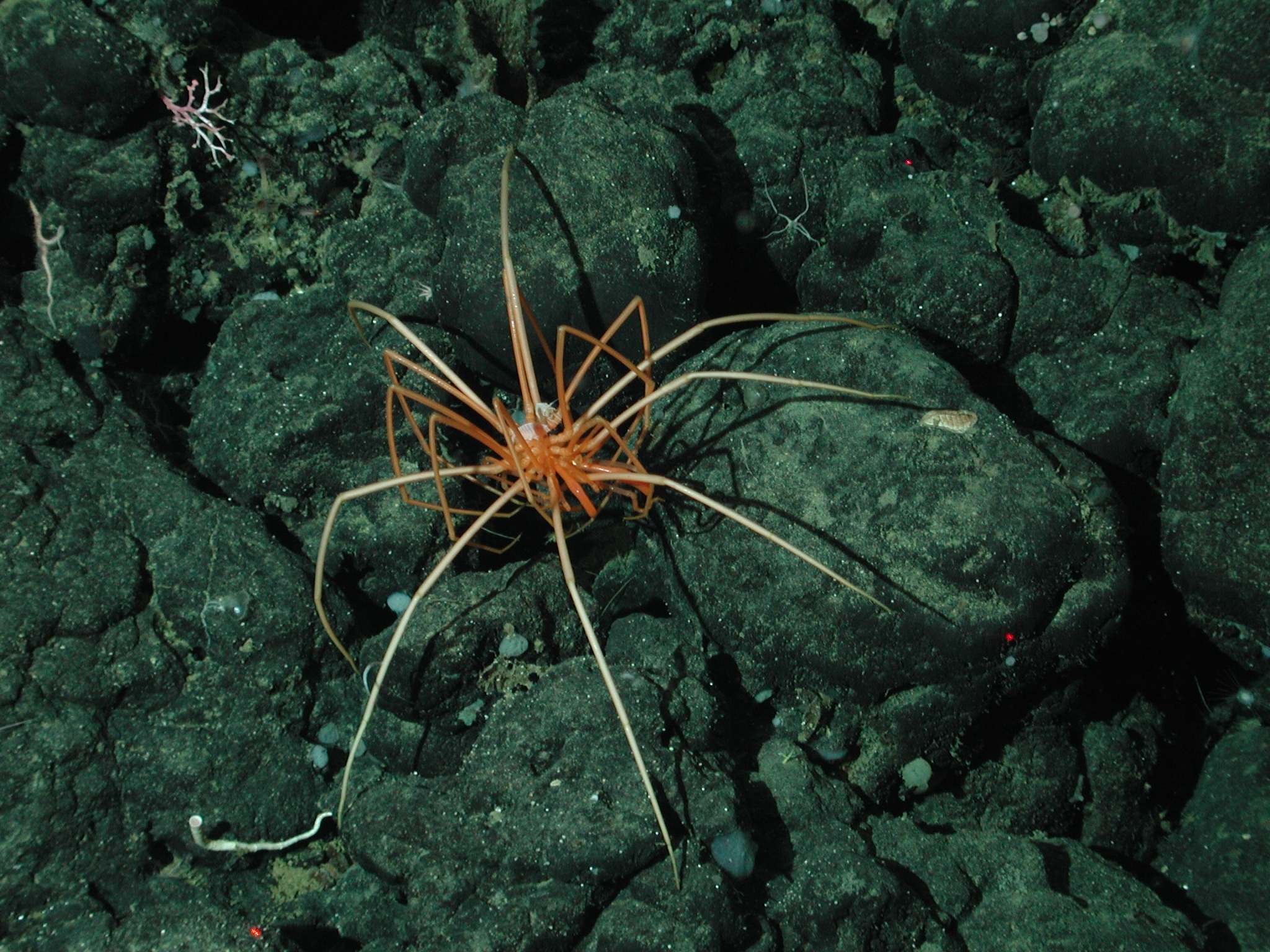
A pair of mating Colossendeis

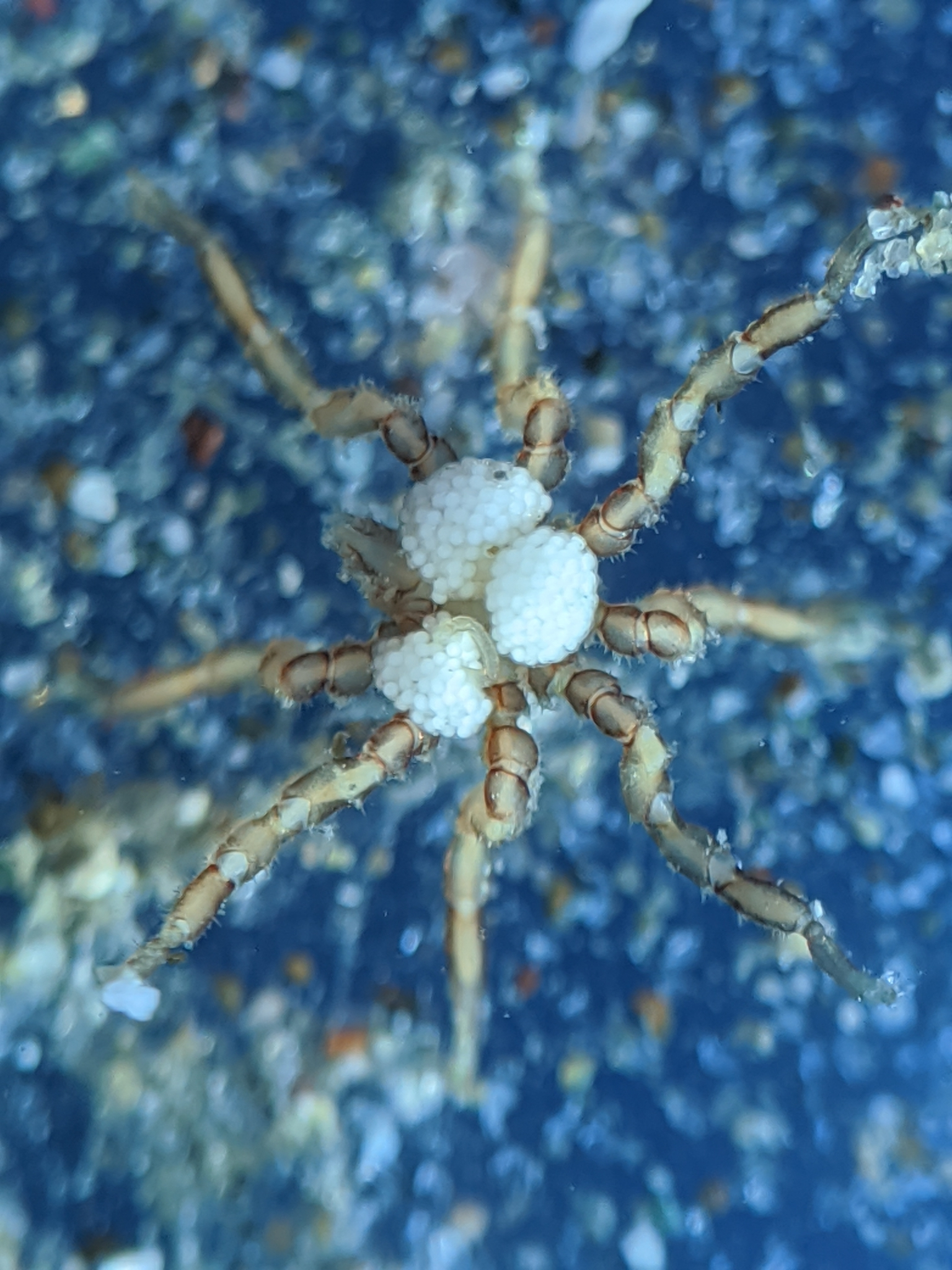
Tanystylum californicum with eggs, ventral view.

All sea spiders have separate sexes, except the only known hermaphroditic species Ascorhynchus corderoi and some extremely rare gynandromorph cases. Among all extant families, Austrodecidae and Rhynchothoracidae are the only two that still lack any observations on their reproductive behaviour and life cycle, as well as Colossendeidae until the mid 2020s. Reproduction involves external fertilisation when male and female stack together (usually male on top), exuding sperm and eggs from the gonopores of their respective leg coxae. After fertilisation, males glue the egg cluster with cement glands and using their ovigers (the oviger-lacking Nulloviger using only the ventral body wall) to carry the laid eggs and young. Colossendeidae is the only known exception that the egg mass was placed on substrate and well-camouflaged.

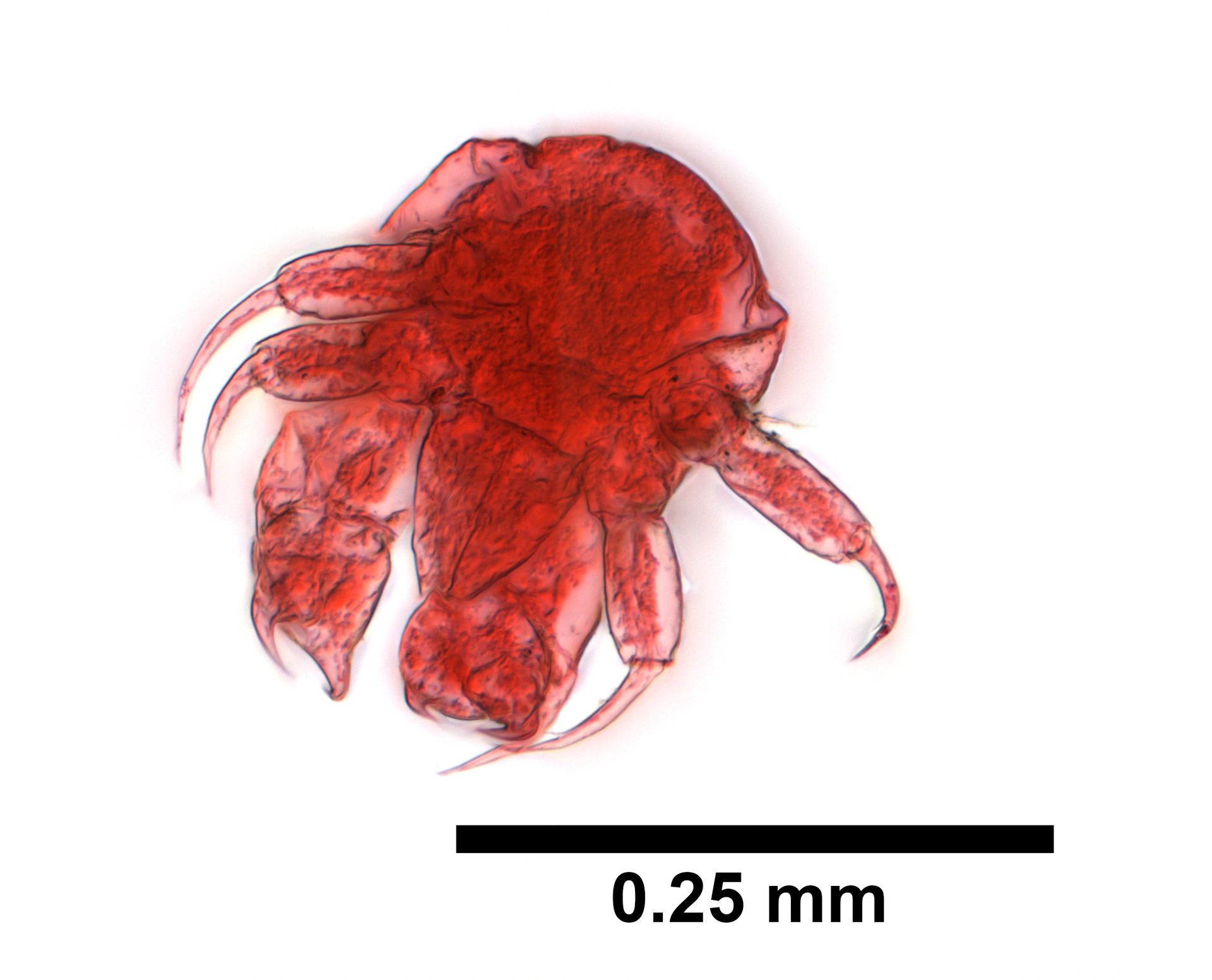
Protonymphon larva of Achelia spinosa

In most cases, the offsprings hatch as a distinct larval stage known as protonymphon. It has a blind gut and the body consists of a cephalon and its first three pairs of cephalic appendages only: the chelifores, palps and ovigers. In this stage, the chelifores usually have attachment glands, while the palps and ovigers are subequal, three-segmented appendages known as palpal and ovigeral larval limbs. When the larvae moult into the postlarval stage, they undergo transitional metamorphosis: the leg-bearing segments develop and the three pairs of cephalic appendages further develop or reduce. The postlarva eventually metamorphoses into a juvenile that looks like a miniature adult, which will continue to moult into an adult with a fixed number of walking legs. In Pycnogonidae, the ovigers are reduced in juveniles but reappear in oviger-bearing adult males.

These kinds of "head-only" larvae and their anamorphic metamorphosis resemble crustacean nauplius larvae and megacheiran larvae, all together they might reflect how the larvae of a common ancestor of all arthropods developed: starting its life as a tiny animal with a few head appendages, while new body segments and appendages were gradually added as it was growing.

Further details of the postembryonic developments of sea spiders vary, but their categorization might differ between literatures. As of the 2010s, there are five types identified as follows:

Type Characteristics	1	2	3	4	5
Also known as	typical protonymphon	attaching larva (partially), lecithotrophic protonymphon	atypical protonymphon	encysted larva	attaching larva (partially)
Hatch as	protonymphon	protonymphon	protonymphon	protonymphon	postlarva
Palpal and ovigeral larval limbs	functional, claw-like	functional, claw-like	functional, claw-like	functional, filament-like	variably reduced or absent
Hatching with walking leg buds	no	no	no	no	at least leg 1–2 present
Walking leg development	sequential	sequential	synchronized for all legs	synchronized for leg 1–3	remaining legs sequential
Instar leaving father	protonymphon	postlarva with at least leg 1–2	protonymphon	protonymphon	postlarva with at least leg 1–2
Postlarval life cycle	parasite of cnidarians and rarely mollusks	lecithotrophic on ovigers, thereafter free living	ectoparasites of mollusks and polychaetes	endoparasite of hydrozoans	lecithotrophic on oviger, thereafter free living
Occurred taxa	Ammotheidae, Ascorhynchidae, Endeidae, Nymphonidae, Pallenopsidae, Pycnogonidae, Colossendeidae	Ammotheidae, Nymphonidae	Ammotheidae	Ammotheidae, Phoxichilidiidae	Callipallenidae, Nymphonidae, Pallenopsidae

The type 1 (typical protonymphon) is the most common and possibly an ancestral one. When the type 2 and 5 (attaching larva) hatches it immediately attaches itself to the ovigers of the father, where it will stay until it has turned into a small and young juvenile with two or three pairs of walking legs ready for a free-living existence. The type 3 (atypical protonymphon) have limited observations. The adults are free living, while the larvae and the juveniles live on or inside temporary hosts such as polychaetes and clams. The type 4 (encysted larva) is a parasite that hatches from the egg and finds a host in the shape of a polyp colony where it burrows into and turns into a cyst, and will not leave the host before it has turned into a young juvenile.

== Taxonomy ==
=== Phylogenetic position ===
- - Chelicerata
    - Pycnogonida
    - Euchelicerata
      Xiphosura and Arachnida
  - Mandibulata
    - Myriapoda
    - Pancrustacea
      Crustacea and Hexapoda

Best-supported position of Pycnogonida

- - Pycnogonida
  - Cormogonida
    - Euchelicerata
      Xiphosura and Arachnida
    - Myriapoda
    - Pancrustacea
      Crustacea and Hexapoda

Cormogonida hypothesis

Sea spiders had been interpreted as some kind of arachnids or crustaceans in historical studies. However, after the concept of Chelicerata was established in the 20th century, sea spiders have long been considered part of the subphylum, alongside euchelicerate taxa such as Xiphosura (horseshoe crabs) and Arachnida (spiders, scorpions, mites, ticks, harvestmen and other lesser-known orders).

A competing hypothesis in the 2000s proposed that Pycnogonida belong to their own lineage, sister to the lineage leading to other extant arthropods (i.e. euchelicerates, myriapods, crustaceans and hexapods, collectively known as Cormogonida). This Cormogonida hypothesis was first indicated by early phylogenomic analyses around that time, followed by another study suggesting that the sea spider's chelifores are not positionally homologous to the chelicerae of euchelicerates (originating from the deutocerebral segment/somite 1), as was previously supposed. Instead, the chelifore nerves were thought to be innervated by the protocerebrum, the first segment of the arthropod brain which corresponded to the ocular somite, bearing the eyes and labrum. This condition of having paired protocerebral appendages is not found anywhere else among arthropods, except in other panarthropods such as onychophorans (primary antennae) and contestably in Cambrian stem-group arthropods like radiodonts (frontal appendages), which was taken as evidence that Pycnogonida may be basal to all other living arthropods, since the protocerebral appendages were thought to be reduced and fused into a labrum in the last common ancestor of crown-group arthropods, and pycnogonids did not have a labrum coexisting with the chelifores. If that is true, it would have meant the sea spiders are the last surviving (and highly modified) members of an ancient, basal arthropod group that originated in the Cambrian oceans. However, the basis of this hypothesis was immediately refuted by subsequent studies using Hox gene expression patterns, demonstrating the developmental homology between chelicerae and chelifores, with chelifore nerves innervated by a deuterocerebrum that has been rotated forwards, which was misinterpreted as a protocerebrum by the aforementioned study.

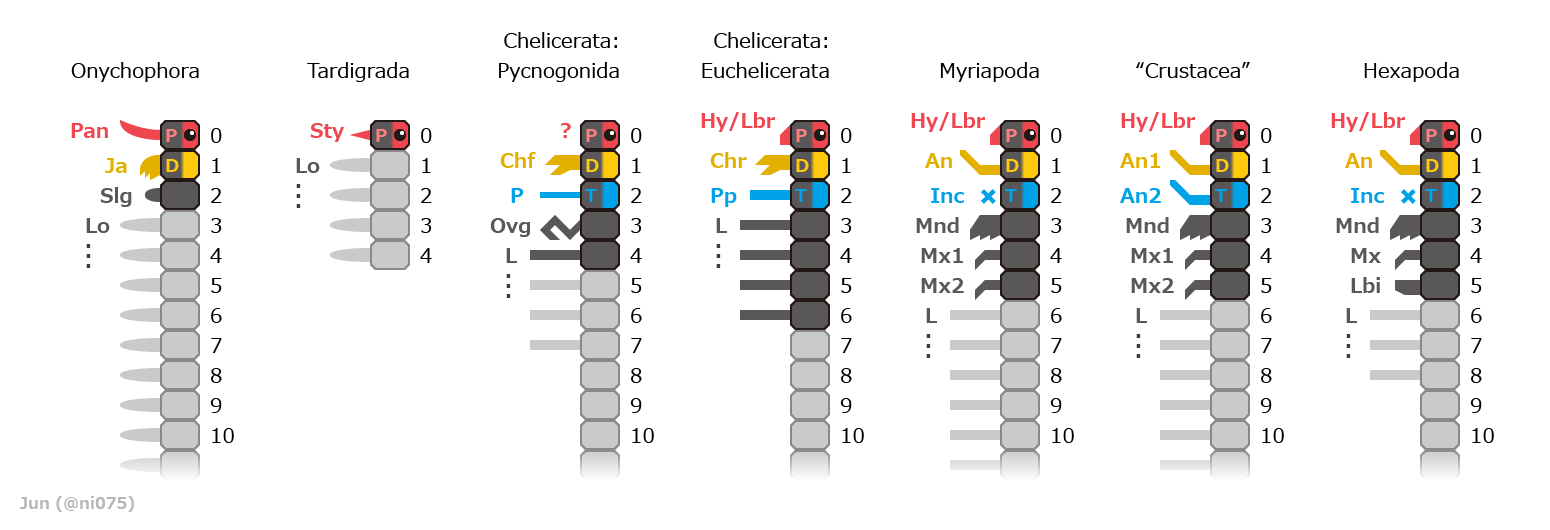
Alignment of anterior somites and appendages of extant panarthropods, with chelifores (Chf) indicated as deutocerebral (D, yellow) somite 1 appendages. Dark grey indicating head somites.

Since the 2010s, the chelicerate affinity of Pycnogonida regained wide support as the sister group of Euchelicerata. Under the basis of phylogenomics, this is one of the only stable topologies of chelicerate interrelationships in contrast to the uncertain relationship of many euchelicerate taxa (e.g. poorly resolved position of arachnid orders other than tetrapulmonates and scorpions; non-monophyly of Arachnida in respect to Xiphosura). This is consistent with the chelifore-chelicera homology, as well as other morphological similarities and differences between pycnogonids and euchelicerates. Based on molecular clock and fossil records, a 2025 study suggests pycnogonids and euchelicerates diverged during the Cambrian. However, due to the pycnogonids' highly modified anatomy and lack of intermediate fossils, their evolutional origin and relationship with the basal fossil chelicerates (such as habeliids and Mollisonia) is still difficult to compare and interpret.

=== Interrelationship ===
- - ?
    stem-groups (e.g. Palaeoisopus, Flagellopantopus, Palaeopantopus)
  - Pantopoda
    - Stiripasterida
      Austrodecidae
    - Eupantopodida
      - - Colossendeoidea
          - Colossendeidae
          - - Rhynchothoracidae
            - Pycnogonidae
      - - - Phoxichilidioidea
            - Endeidae
            - Phoxichilidiidae
          - Ammotheoidea
            - Pallenopsidae
            - Ammotheidae
        - ?
          Ascorhynchidae
          (including Nymphonella?)
        - - Nymphonoidea
            - Callipallenidae
              (paraphyletic)
            - Nymphonidae

Internal phylogeny of Pycnogonida.

The class Pycnogonida comprises over 1,300 species, which are split into over 80 genera. All extant genera are considered part of the single order Pantopoda, which was subdivided into 11 families. Historically there were only 9 families, with species of nowadays Ascorhynchidae placed under Ammotheidae and Pallenopsidae under Callipallenidae. Both were eventually separated after they were considered distinct from the once-belonged families.

Phylogenomic analysis of extant sea spiders was able to establish a backbone tree for Pantopoda, revealing some consistent relationships such as the basal position of Austrodecidae, monophyly of some major branches (later redefined as superfamilies) and the paraphyly of Callipallenidae with respect to Nymphonidae. The topology also suggests Pantopoda is undergoing cephalic appendage reduction/reappearance and polymerous species acquisition multiple times, contrary to previous hypothesis on pantopod evolution (cephalic appendages were thought to be progressively reduced along the branches, and the polymerous condition was thought to be ancestral). On the other hand, the positions of Ascorhynchidae and Nymphonella are less certain across multiple results.

The positions of Paleozoic pycnogonids are poorly examined, but most, if not, all of the described species most likely represent members of stem-groups basal to Pantopoda (crown-group Pycnogonida), especially those with a segmented abdomen, a feature that was most likely ancestral and reduced in the Pantopoda lineage. While some phylogenetic analyses place them within Pantopoda, this result is questionable as they have low support values and based on outdated interpretations of the fossil taxa. Based on the stem-group interpretation and molecular clock analysis, a 2025 study suggest Pantopoda started to diversify around the early Silurian to the late Devonian, inferring a ghost lineage of Paleozoic pantopods existed long before the oldest known pantopod around the Jurassic period.

According to the World Register of Marine Species, the Class Pycnogonida is subdivided as follows (with subsequent updates on fossil taxa after Sabroux et al. (2023, 2024)):

- Unknown Order
  - Unknown Family
    - Genus †Cambropycnogon Waloszek & Dunlop, 2002
    - Genus †Flagellopantopus Poschmann & Dunlop, 2005 (classified under Pantopoda incertae sedis by WoRMS)
    - Genus †Haliestes Siveter et al., 2004 (previously classified under Order Nectopantpoda Bamber, 2007 and Family Haliestidae Bamber, 2007)
    - Genus †Palaeoisopus Broili, 1928 (Previously classified under Order Palaeoisopoda Hedgpeth, 1978 and Family Palaeoisopodidae Dubinin, 1957)
    - Genus †Palaeomarachne Rudkin et al., 2013
    - Genus †Palaeopantopus Broili, 1929 (Previously classified under Order Palaeopantopoda Broili, 1930 and Family Palaeopantopodidae Hedgpeth, 1955)
    - Genus †Palaeothea Bergstrom, Sturmer & Winter, 1980 (previously classified under Pantopoda, potential nomen dubium)
    - Genus †Pentapantopus Kühl, Poschmann & Rust, 2013 (previously classified under Pantopoda)
- Order Pantopoda Gerstäcker, 1863
  - Suborder Eupantopodida Fry, 1978
    - Superfamily Ammotheoidea Dohrn, 1881
      - Family Ammotheidae Dohrn, 1881
      - Family Pallenopsidae Fry, 1978
    - Superfamily Ascorhynchoidea Pocock, 1904
      - Genus Hannonia Hoek, 1881
      - Family Ascorhynchidae Hoek, 1881 (=Eurycydidae Sars, 1891)
    - Superfamily Colossendeoidea Hoek, 1881 (=Pycnogonoidea Pocock, 1904; Rhynchothoracoidea Fry, 1978)
      - Family Colossendeidae Jarzynsky, 1870
      - Family Pycnogonidae Wilson, 1878
      - Family Rhynchothoracidae Thompson, 1909
    - Superfamily Nymphonoidea Pocock, 1904
      - Family Callipallenidae Hilton, 1942
      - Family Nymphonidae Wilson, 1878
    - Superfamily Phoxichilidioidea Sars, 1891
      - Family Endeidae Norman, 1908
      - Family Phoxichilidiidae Sars, 1891
  - Suborder Stiripasterida Fry, 1978
    - Family Austrodecidae Stock, 1954
  - Suborder incertae sedis
    - Family †Palaeopycnogonididae Sabroux, Edgecombe, Pisani & Garwood, 2023
    - Unknown Family
      - Genus Alcynous Costa, 1861 (nomen dubium)
      - Genus Foxichilus Costa, 1836 (nomen dubium)
      - Genus Oiceobathys Hesse, 1867 (nomen dubium)
      - Genus Oomerus Hesse, 1874 (nomen dubium)
      - Genus Paritoca Philippi, 1842 (nomen dubium)
      - Genus Pephredro Goodsir, 1842 (nomen dubium)
      - Genus Phanodemus Costa, 1836 (nomen dubium)
      - Genus Platychelus Costa, 1861 (nomen dubium)

== Fossil record ==
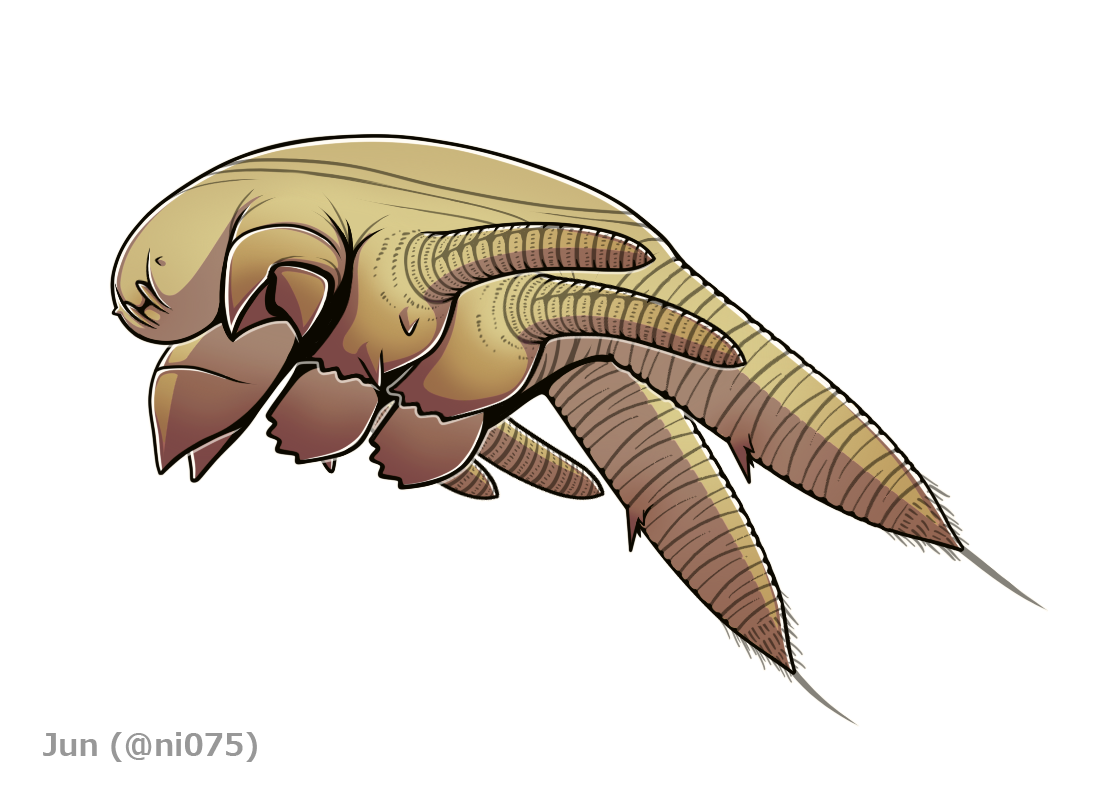
Reconstruction of the larva Cambropycnogon klausmuelleri

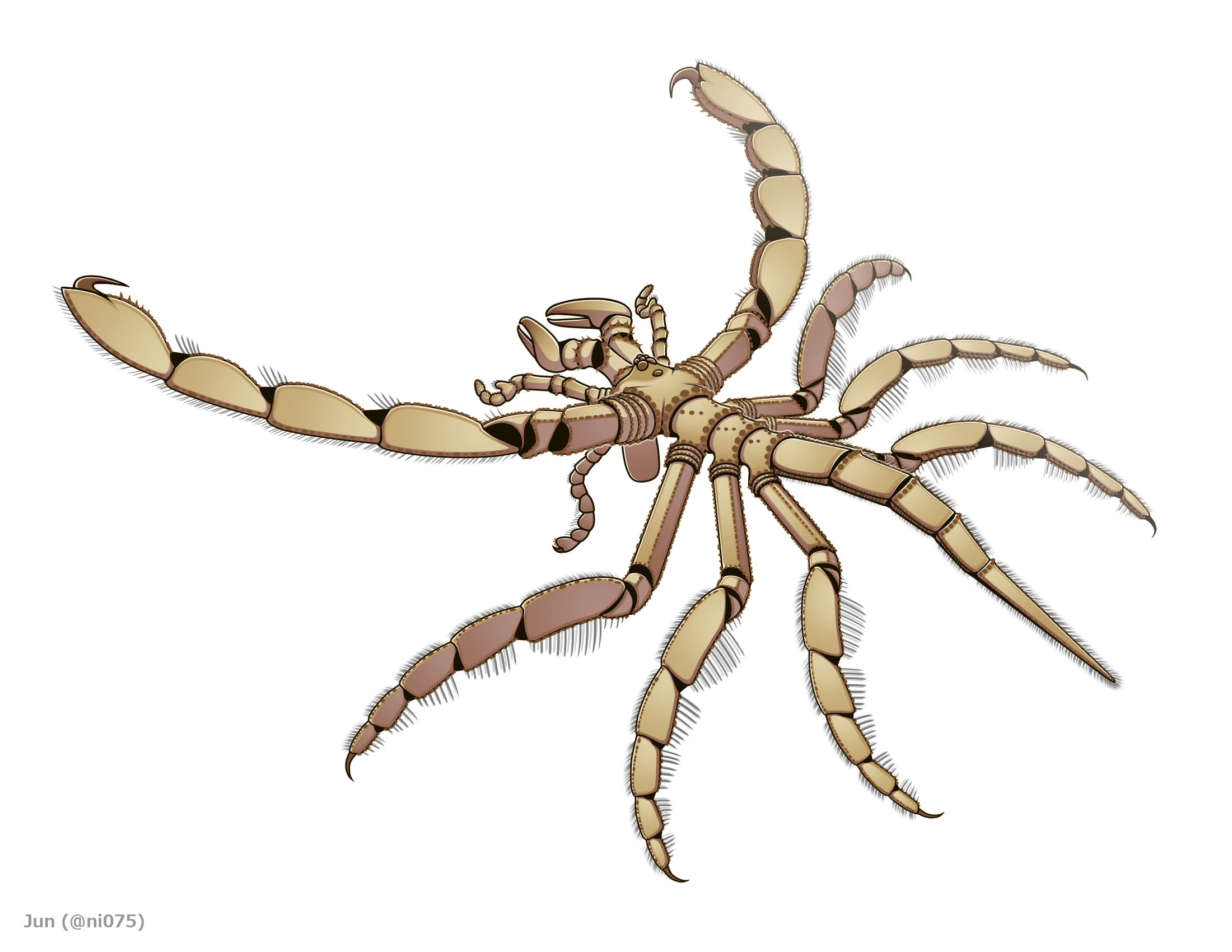
Reconstruction of Palaeoisopus problematicus

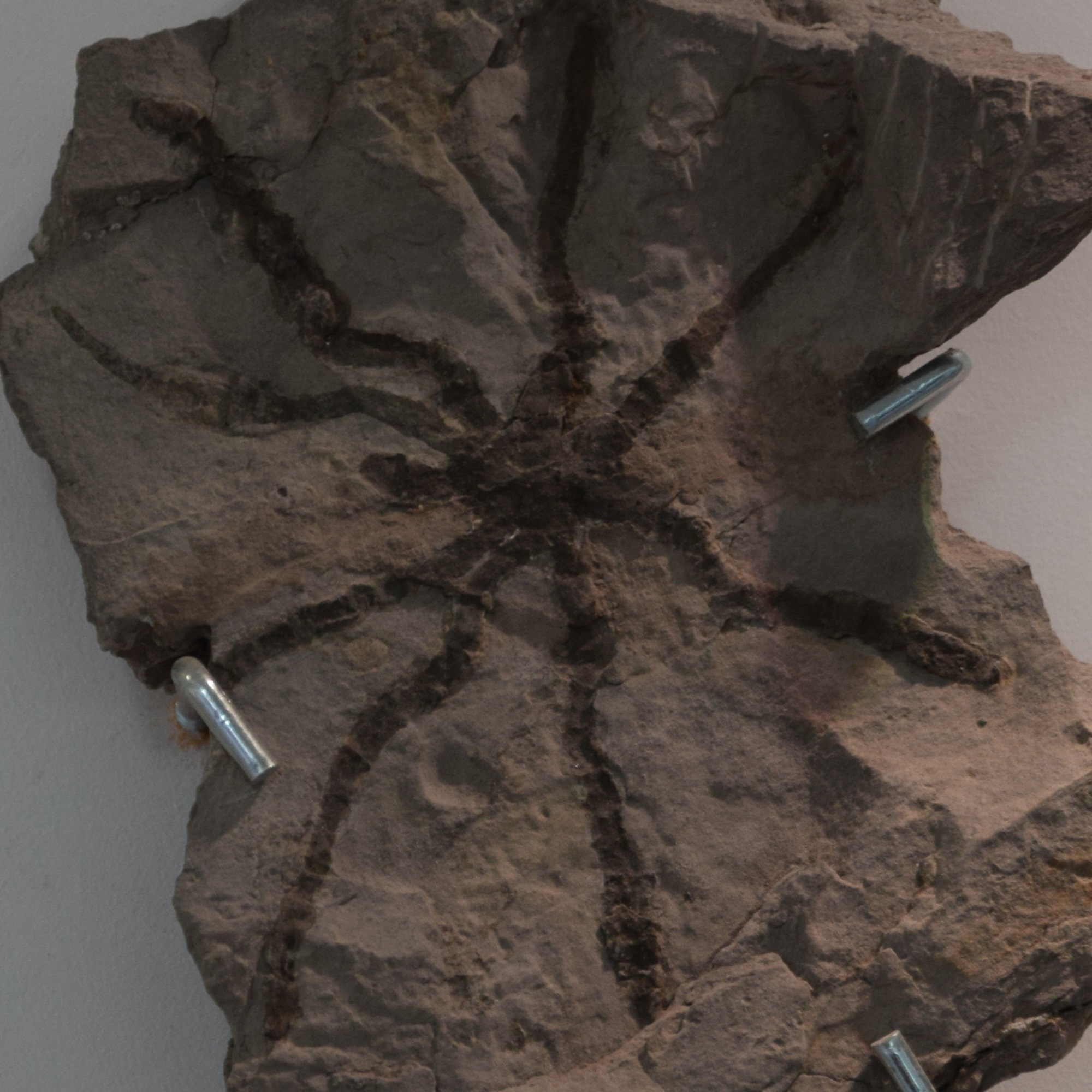
Fossil of Colossopantopodus boissinensis

The fossil record of pycnogonids is scant, represented only by a handful of fossil sites with exceptional preservation (Lagerstätte). While most of them are discovered from Paleozoic era, unambiguous evidence of crown-group (Pantopoda) only restricted to Mesozoic era.

The earliest fossils are Cambropycnogon discovered from the Cambrian 'Orsten' of Sweden (ca. 500 Ma). So far only its protonymphon larvae had been described, featuring some traits unknown from other pycnogonids such as paired anterior projections, gnathobasic larval limbs and annulated terminal appendages. Due to its distinct morphology, some studies have argued that this genus is not a pycnogonid at all.

Ordovician pycnogonids are only known by Palaeomarachne (ca. 450 Ma), a genus found in William Lake Provincial Park, Manitoba and described in 2013. It only preserve possible moults of the fragmental body segments, with one showing an apparently segmented head region. However, just like Cambropycnogon, its pycnogonid affinity was questioned by some studies as well.

The Silurian Coalbrookdale Formation of England (Haliestes, ca. 425 Ma) and the Devonian Hunsrück Slate of Germany (Flagellopantopus, Palaeopantopus, Palaeoisopus, Palaeothea and Pentapantopus, ca. 400 Ma) include unambigious fossil pycnogonids with exceptional preservation. The latter is by far the most diverse community of fossil pycnogonids in terms of both species number and morphology. Some of them are significant in that they possess something never seen in pantopods: annulated coxae, flattened swimming legs, segmented abdomen and elongated telson. These provide some clues on the evolution of sea spider bodyplan before the arise and diversification of Pantopoda.

Fossil of Mesozoic pycnogonids are even rare, and so far all of them are Jurassic pantopods. Historically there are two genus (Pentapalaeopycnon and Pycnogonites) from the Solnhofen Limestone (ca. 150 Ma) of Germany being described as such, which are in fact misidentified phyllosoma larvae of decapod crustaceans. The actual first report of Mesozoic pycnogonids was described by researchers from the University of Lyon in 2007, discovering 3 new genus (Palaeopycnogonides, Colossopantopodus and Palaeoendeis) from La Voulte-sur-Rhône of Jurassic La Voulte Lagerstätte (ca. 160 Ma), south-east France. The discovery fill in an enormous fossil gap in the record between Devonian and extant sea spiders. In 2019, a new species of Colossopantopodus and a specimen possibly belong to the extant genus Eurycyde were discovered from the aforementioned Solnhofen limestone.
