= Pentapycnon charcoti =

Scientific classification
- Kingdom: Animalia
- Phylum: Arthropoda
- Subphylum: Chelicerata
- Class: Pycnogonida
- Order: Pantopoda
- Family: Pycnogonidae
- Genus: Pentapycnon
- Species: P. charcoti

Binomial name
- Pentapycnon charcoti Bouvier, 1910

Species of sea spider

Pentapycnon charcoti is a species of sea spider (class Pycnogonida) in the family Pycnogonidae. As the genus name Pentapycnon suggests, the sea spider P. charcoti is among the seven species of sea spiders with five pairs of legs in adults rather than the usual four leg pairs. This species is found in the Southern Ocean.

== Discovery ==
This species was first described in 1911 by the French zoologist Eugène Louis Bouvier based on three specimens, including an adult male type specimen. He originally described the other two specimens as females but later found them to be male juveniles. These three specimens were dredged from a depth of 420 meters below the surface in Admiralty Bay on King George Island in the South Shetland Islands of Antarctica. Bouvier named this species for the French scientist Jean-Baptiste Charcot, who led the Antarctic expedition on the ship Pourquoi-Pas that collected these specimens. The first female specimens on record were described in 1969 by the American marine biologist Joel W. Hedgpeth and the British zoologist William G. Fry, who examined five new specimens (four females and one male) found in five different locations as deep as 1,420 meters below the surface.

== Description ==
The adult in this species features five pairs of legs, is brown, and reaches a relatively large size for a sea spider in the family Pycnogonidae. The trunk in adults ranges from 8.0 mm to 19.8 mm in length and from 3.4 mm to 5.0 mm in width. The proboscis ranges from 5.5 mm to 9.2 mm in length, ranging from about one half to nearly three quarters the length of the trunk. The abdomen is shaped like a club and ranges from 2.9 mm to 5.0 mm in length. The ovigers are only present in the males, and each oviger features nine segments and ends in a short curved claw.

The basal two thirds of the proboscis is like a cylinder, but somewhat ovoid with a maximum diameter about one third of the length of the proboscis from the base. The distal third of the proboscis features a distinctive dilated collar with three tubercles: a pair of larger tubercles on the ventral surface and one smaller tubercle on the dorsal surface. The opening is on the ventral side of the tip of the proboscis.

The legs are short and stout, with each leg about twice as long as the trunk. Each leg ends in a short claw that is slightly curved and tapers to a sharp point. The article adjacent to the terminal claw on each leg (propodus) features a row of tiny spines on the ventral surface, and the next most distal article (tarsus) is very short with a dense field of short sharp spines on the ventral surface. The three most proximal articles (coxae) are about equal in length.

This sea spider shares many traits with the other two species in the ten-legged genus Pentapycnon, P. bouvieri and P. geayi. For example, all three Pentapycnon species feature not only five leg pairs but also bodies and legs that are short and stout. Furthermore, ovigers are present in the males of all three species, and each oviger features several segments and a curved terminal claw. Moreover, the trunk in all three species is fully segmented.

The species P. charcoti shares a more extensive set of traits, however, with the species P. bouvieri than with the species P. geayi. For example, the ovigers each feature nine segments and a slightly curved claw in both P. charcoti and P. bouvieri but only seven segments and a markedly curved claw in P. geayi. Furthermore, the surface of P. geayi is markedly reticulated but the surfaces of P. charcoti and P. bouvieri are not.

The species P. charcoti can be distinguished from the species P. bouvieri, however, based on other traits. For example, the proboscis in P. bouvieri lacks the dilated collar and tubercles that appear at the distal end of the proboscis in P. charcoti, so the proboscis in P. bouvieri reaches the maximum diameter only in the middle. Furthermore, P. bouvieri is larger, with a trunk that can range not only from 18.5 mm to 25.3 mm in length but also from 11.4 mm to 17.2 mm in width, reaching more than three times the maximum width recorded in P. charcoti. The proboscis in P. bouvieri is also notably longer, almost as long as the trunk. This proboscis can range from 11.7 mm to 21.6 mm in length, reaching more than twice the maximum length recorded in P. charcoti.

== Phylogeny ==
In 2007, a phylogenetic analysis of 63 species of sea spiders based on morphology and molecular data found Pentapycnon charcoti nested among species of Pycnogonum, another genus in the family Pycnogonidae, in a phylogenetic tree of the class Pycnogonida. In particular, this analysis placed Pentapycnon charcoti in a clade with Pycnogonum diceros, with this clade forming a sister group for Pycnogonum stearnsi. Thus, the eight-legged genus Pycnogonum is paraphyletic with respect to the ten-legged genus Pentapycnon.

Furthermore, in 2023, a phylogenetic analysis of 141 species of sea spiders based on molecular data placed two species of Pentapycnon on two different branches of a phylogenetic tree, each with different species of Pycnogonum forming a sister group. Thus, the genus Pentapycnon is polyphyletic. This evidence suggests that species of Pentapycnon descended from ancestors with eight legs and that the species Pentapycnon charcoti may be more closely related to some eight-legged Pycnogonum species than to some ten-legged Pentapycnon species.

For example, Pentapycnon charcoti shares many traits with its close relative Pycnogonum diceros, the eight-legged sea spider that most closely resembles Pentapycnon charcoti. Both of these species feature ovigers with nine segments and a terminal claw. In both species, the proboscis not only features a dorsal tubercle but is also dilated near the distal end with additional tubercles. Both species feature not only small spines on the ventral surface of the propodus but also a dense patch of sharp spines on the tarsus. These two species are also similar in size, with Pycnogonum diceros featuring a trunk that ranges from 9.0 mm to 15.0 mm in length and a proboscis that ranges from 7.0 mm to 9.0 mm in length.

The species Pentapycnon charcoti can be distinguished from Pycnogonum diceros, however, based on other traits. For example, Pentapycnon charcoti features five leg pairs whereas Pycnogonum diceros features only four leg pairs. Furthermore, the proboscis features tubercles only at the distal end in Pentapycnon charcoti but features a more proximal tubercle in Pycnogonum diceros. Moreover, the third coxa of each leg in Pycnogonum diceros features a distinctive tubercle or gland field on the anterior surface, but this feature is absent in other species of Pycnogonum and in species of Pentapycnon.

== Distribution ==
The species Pentapycnon charcoti is endemic to the Antarctic zone. This sea spider has been recorded in the Ross Sea and the Scotia Sea and off the Antarctic Peninsula. This species has been found at depths ranging from 218 to 1,420 meters below the surface.
