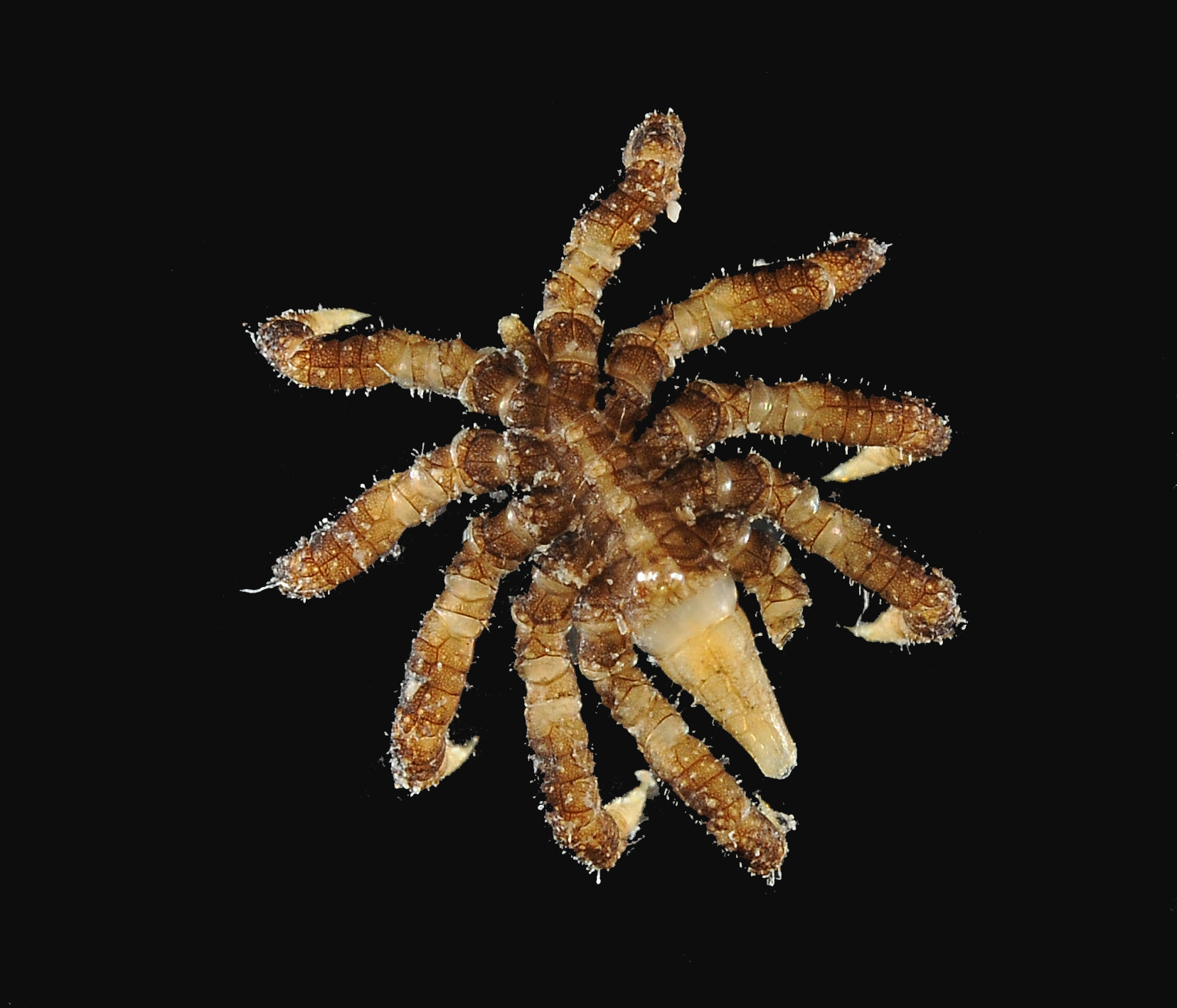

Scientific classification
- Kingdom: Animalia
- Phylum: Arthropoda
- Subphylum: Chelicerata
- Class: Pycnogonida
- Order: Pantopoda
- Family: Pycnogonidae
- Genus: Pentapycnon
- Species: P. geayi

Binomial name
- Pentapycnon geayi Bouvier, 1911

= Pentapycnon geayi =

Species of sea spider

Pentapycnon geayi is a species of sea spider (class Pycnogonida) in the family Pycnogonidae. As the genus name Pentapycnon suggests, the sea spider P. geayi is among the seven species of sea spiders with five pairs of legs in adults rather than the usual four leg pairs. The species P. geayi is found in the Caribbean Sea, the tropical Atlantic Ocean, and the Mediterranean Sea. This species is one of only two species of polymerous (i.e., extra-legged) sea spiders found outside the Southern Ocean.

== Discovery ==
This species was first described in 1911 by the French zoologist Eugène Louis Bouvier. He based the original description of this species on numerous specimens including both sexes found off the coast of French Guiana near the city of Cayenne. He named this species in memory of the late French naturalist Martin François Geay, who collected these specimens.

== Description ==
This species is small, with the average trunk measuring only 3.5 mm in length. This sea spider is brown and features five pairs of legs in adults with a small single claw at the end of each leg. The body and legs are short and stout with a reticulated surface. The trunk is fully segmented and features a series of four tubercles down the middle of the back directly behind the ocular tubercle, which is taller than the other four dorsal tubercles. The ocular tubercle is located in the middle of the cephalic segment and features four small eyes with dark pigment. The proboscis is shaped like a truncated cone that is narrower at the distal end. Only the males feature ovigers, which are relatively small and short. Each oviger features seven segments and a curved terminal claw.

This species shares many traits with the other two species in the ten-legged genus Pentapycnon, P. bouvieri and P. charcoti. For example, all three Pentapycnon species feature not only five leg pairs but also bodies and legs that are short and stout. Furthermore, ovigers are present in the males of all three species, and each oviger features several segments and a curved terminal claw. Moreover, the trunk in all three species is fully segmented.

Several features, however, distinguish P. geayi from the other two species in the same genus. For example, the surface is markedly reticulated in P. geayi but not in the other two species. Furthermore, the ovigers each feature nine segments and a slightly curved claw in P. bouvieri and P. charcoti but only seven segments and a markedly curved claw in P. geayi. Moreover, the proboscis is conical and tapers continuously from the base to the distal end in P. geayi but reaches a maximum diameter away from the base before tapering near the distal end in the other two species. The other two species are also larger, with trunks in adults that can range from 8.0 mm to 19.8 mm in length in P. charcoti and from 18.5 mm to 25.3 mm in length in P. bouvieri.

== Phylogeny ==
In 2023, a phylogenetic analysis of 141 species of sea spiders based on molecular data found Pentapycnon geayi nested among species of Pycnogonum, another genus in the family Pycnogonidae, in a phylogenetic tree of the class Pycnogonida. In particular, this analysis placed Pentapycnon geayi in a clade with Pycnogonum cesairei, with this clade forming a sister group for other species of Pycnogonum. Thus, the eight-legged genus Pycnogonum is paraphyletic with respect to the ten-legged genus Pentapycnon. This evidence indicates that Pentapycnon geayi descended from ancestors with eight legs.

Furthermore, this analysis also placed another species of Pentapycnon on a different branch of this phylogenetic tree, with different species of Pycnogonum forming a sister group. Thus, the genus Pentapycnon is polyphyletic. This evidence indicates that the species Pentapycnon geayi is more closely related to some eight-legged Pycnogonum species than to some ten-legged Pentapycnon species.

For example, Pentapycnon geayi shares many traits with its close relative Pycnogonum cesairei and an especially extensive set of traits with Pycnogonum reticulatum. Each of these three species features a body and legs that are short and stout, reticulated surfaces, a conical proboscis, a series of tubercles down the middle of the back, and ovigers in the male that each feature several segments and a curved terminal claw. These two Pycnogonum species are also small, with the trunk of the holotype measuring 1.5 mm in length in Pycnogonum cesairei and 3.0 mm in length in Pycnogonum reticulatum.

The species Pentapycnon geayi can be distinguished from these two Pycnogonum species, however, not only by the number of legs but also based on other traits. For example, the dorsal tubercles are taller and the proboscis is longer and more tapered in Pentapycnon geayi than in these two Pycnogonum species. Furthermore, the ovigers each feature eight segments in Pycnogonum cesairei but only seven segments in Pentapycnon geayi and Pycnogonum reticulatum.

== Distribution ==
The species Pentapycnon geayi has been recorded in the Caribbean Sea, near Costs Rica, and in the tropical western Atlantic Ocean, near Puerto Rico, Martinique, French Guiana, Suriname, and Brazil, as well as in the Alboran Sea in the Mediterranean, near the coast of Spain and Gibraltar. Along the Atlantic coast of Brazil, this sea spider has been found off the coast in the states of Pará, Ceará, Rio Grande do Norte, and Espírito Santo. This sea spider has been found at depths ranging from 0 to 70 meters below the surface, including specimens collected from tide pools in intertidal sandstone reefs at low tide.
