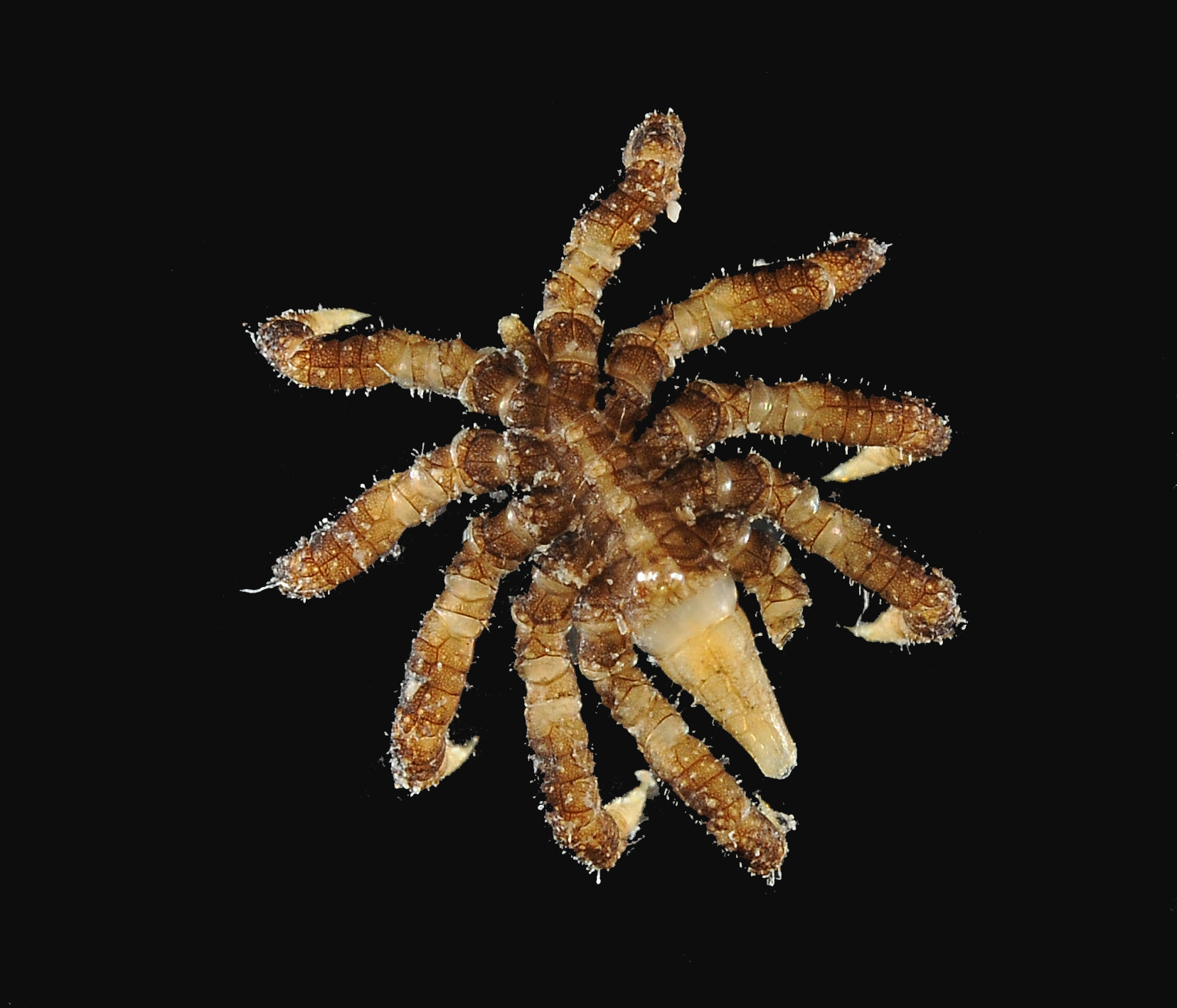
- Pentapycnon geayi

Scientific classification
- Kingdom: Animalia
- Phylum: Arthropoda
- Subphylum: Chelicerata
- Class: Pycnogonida
- Order: Pantopoda
- Family: Pycnogonidae
- Genus: Pentapycnon; Bouvier, 1910

Species
- Pentapycnon bouvieri; Pentapycnon charcoti; Pentapycnon geayi

= Pentapycnon =

Genus of sea spiders

Pentapycnon is a genus of sea spiders (class Pycnogonida) in the family Pycnogonidae. As the name of this genus suggests, Pentapycnon is among the four genera of sea spiders with five pairs of legs in adults rather than the usual four leg pairs. This genus includes three species: P. bouvieri, P. charcoti, and P. geayi. The species P. bouvieri and P. charcoti are found in the Southern Ocean, whereas the species P. geayi is found in the Caribbean Sea, the tropical Atlantic Ocean, and the Mediterranean Sea. The species P. geayi is one of only two species of polymerous (i.e., extra-legged) sea spiders found outside the Southern Ocean.

== Discovery and taxonomy ==
This genus was proposed by the French zoologist Eugène Louis Bouvier in 1910 to contain the newly discovered species P. charcoti. In 1911, Bouvier described the second species in this genus, P. geayi. In 1993, A.F. Pushkin described the third species in this genus, P. bouvieri. In 1994, Christine Stiboy-Risch described P. magnum as a new species in this genus. In 1995, the American marine biologist C. Allan Child described another sea spider as a new species in this genus and also named this species P. bouvieri. Authorities now deem P. magnum to be a junior synonym of P. bouvier and consider the sea spiders described by Stiboy-Risch and Child to be the same species originally described by Pushkin.

== Phylogeny ==
Phylogenetic studies of sea spiders based on molecular data find species of Pentapycnon nested among species of Pycnogonum, another genus in the family Pycnogonidae, in a phylogenetic tree of the class Pycnogonida. For example, in 2007, a phylogenetic analysis of 63 species of sea spiders based on morphology and molecular evidence placed the species Pentapycnon charcoti in a clade with Pycnogonum diceros, with this clade forming a sister group for Pycnogonum stearnsi. Similarly, in 2023, a phylogenetic analysis of 141 species of sea spiders based on molecular data placed Pentapycnon geayi in a clade with Pycnogonum cesairei, with this clade forming a sister group for other species of Pycnogonum. Thus, the eight-legged genus Pycnogonum is paraphyletic with respect to the ten-legged genus Pentapycnon.

Furthermore, the 2023 study also placed two species of Pentapycnon on two different branches of a phylogenetic tree, each with different species of Pycnogonum forming a sister group. Thus, the genus Pentapycnon is polyphyletic. This evidence indicates that species of Pentapycnon descended from ancestors with eight legs and belong in the same genus as their octopodous relatives in Pycnogonum.

== Description ==
The sea spiders in the genus Pentapycnon feature five pairs of legs in adults but otherwise share the traits exhibited by their octopodous relatives in the genus Pycnogonum. Species in both of these genera feature trunks that are wide relative to their lengths. These sea spiders also feature thick legs, with large diameters relative to their lengths. The legs are also short relative to the trunk, and the proboscis is stout and no longer than the trunk. Both palps and chelifores are absent in adults, and only males have ovigers.

Several features distinguish Pentapycnon geayi from the other two species in the same genus, P. bouvieri and P. charcoti. For example, the surface is markedly reticulated in P. geayi but not in the other two species. Furthermore, the ovigers feature nine segments and a slightly curved claw in P. bouvieri and P. charcoti but only seven segments and a markedly curved claw in P. geayi.

All three species in this genus can be distinguished based on the shape of the proboscis. In P. geayi, the proboscis is shaped like a truncated cone that tapers continuously toward the distal end. In P. bouvieri, the proboscis tapers near the distal end, which features a rounded oral surface. In P. charcoti, the proboscis is like a cylinder but tapers near the distal end, which features three rounded tubercles.

The three species in this genus also differ in terms of size. The trunk in adults of the species P. charcoti ranges from 8.0 mm to 19.8 mm in length. The species P. bouvieri is somewhat larger, with a trunk that can range from 18.5 mm to 25.3 mm in length, whereas the species P. geayi is notably smaller, with the average trunk measuring only 3.5 mm in length.

== Distribution ==
The species P. bouvieri and P. charcoti are both found in the Southern Ocean and are endemic to the Antarctic zone. The species P. bouvieri is found in the Scotia Sea and the Weddell Sea at depths ranging from 90 to 429 meters below the surface. The species P. charcoti is found in the Ross Sea and the Scotia Sea and off the Antarctic Peninsula at depths ranging from 218 to 1420 meters below the surface.

The species P. geayi has been recorded in the Caribbean Sea, near Costs Rica, and in the tropical western Atlantic Ocean, near Puerto Rico, Martinique, French Guiana, Suriname, and Brazil, as well as in the Alboran Sea in the Mediterranean, near the coast of Spain and Gibraltar. Along the Atlantic coast of Brazil, this sea spider has been found off the coast in the states of Pará, Ceará, Rio Grande do Norte, and Espírito Santo. This sea spider has been found at depths ranging from 0 to 70 meters below the surface, including specimens collected from tide pools in intertidal sandstone reefs at low tide.

== Species ==
This genus includes three species:

- Pentapycnon bouvieri Pushkin, 1993
- Pentapycnon charcoti Bouvier, 1910
- Pentapycnon geayi Bouvier, 1911
