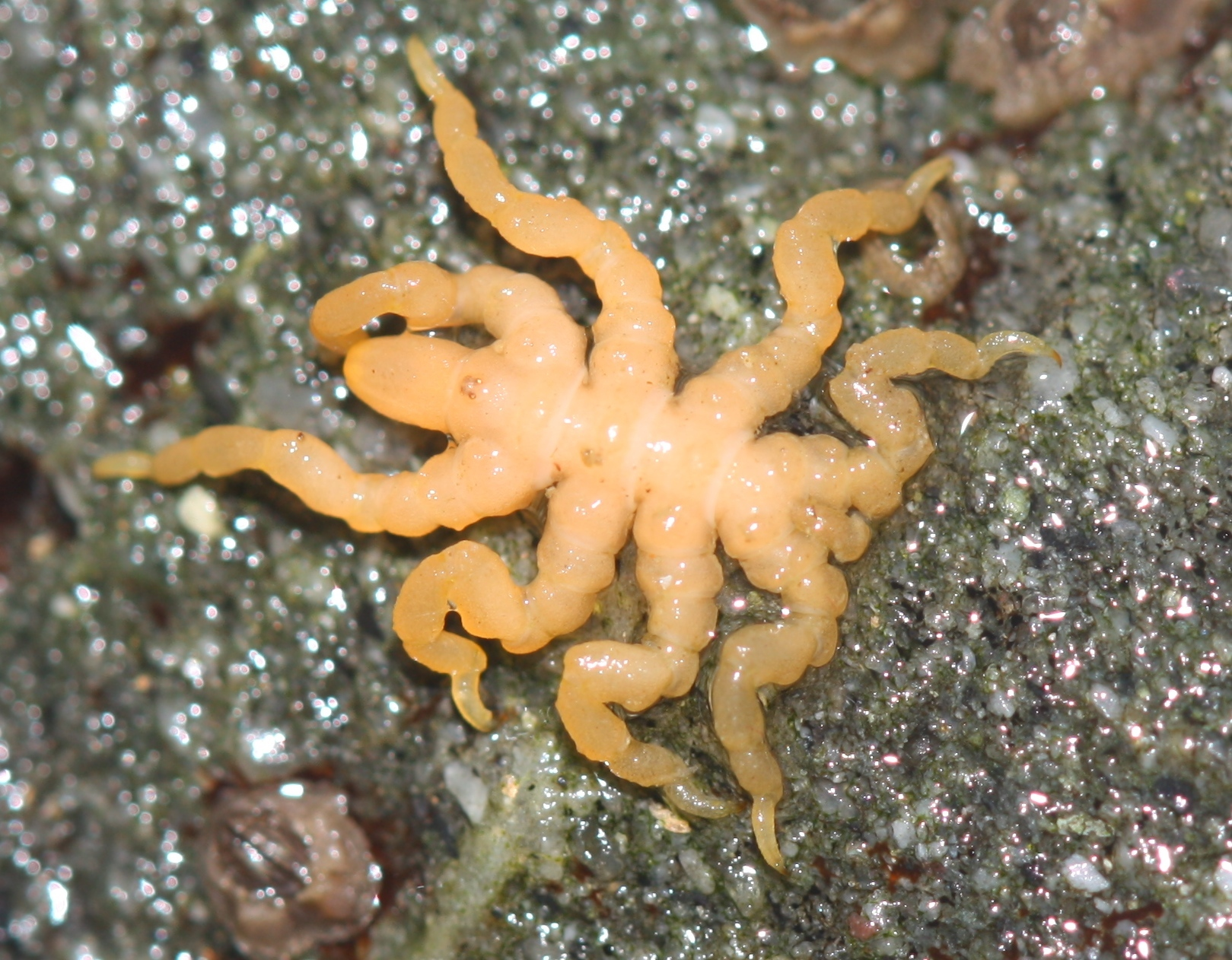

Scientific classification
- Kingdom: Animalia
- Phylum: Arthropoda
- Subphylum: Chelicerata
- Class: Pycnogonida
- Order: Pantopoda
- Family: Pycnogonidae
- Genus: Pycnogonum
- Species: P. stearnsi

Binomial name
- Pycnogonum stearnsi Ives, 1883

= Pycnogonum stearnsi =

Species of sea spider

Pycnogonum stearnsi, commonly known as Stearns' sea spider, is a marine arthropod in the family Pycnogonidae. It is found on the western seaboard of North America.

== Description ==
Pycnogonum stearnsi grows to about 2.5 cm (1 in) in length. It has a head with a large proboscis and a segmented body. It does not have the chelicerae or pedipalps typical of sea spiders but uses its barrel-shaped proboscis for feeding. It has no eyes or spiny processes. It has four pairs of stout walking legs tipped by claws and the male has a short additional pair of legs at the front for carrying the eggs. Its colour is plain white or cream, sometimes tinged pinkish or buff.

== Distribution and habitat ==
Pycnogonum stearnsi is found in the north-east Pacific Ocean. The range extends from British Columbia southwards to California and also includes Japan. It is most common in California, and is found from the mid shore down to low water mark. It hides under rocks or in dead barnacle shells and is often found in close proximity to its prey, the sea anemones Anthopleura sola, Anthopleura xanthogrammica, Anthopleura elegantissima, and Metridium senile; the hydroids, Obelia, and Aglaophenia; and the sea squirt, Clavelina. It feeds by thrusting its proboscis into the prey animal and sucking out fluids, leaving the animal flaccid but alive.

== Biology ==
Individual Pycnogonum stearnsi are either male or female. Eggs are released from gonopores on the female's legs and fertilised externally by the male who is standing on or under the female. The male then collects the eggs and presses them against his ovigerous legs where they adhere, forming a large white mass which he carries around. The eggs later hatch into protonymph larvae which can swim. These moult several times, passing through further nymphal stages before developing the proboscis and feeding method of the adult.
