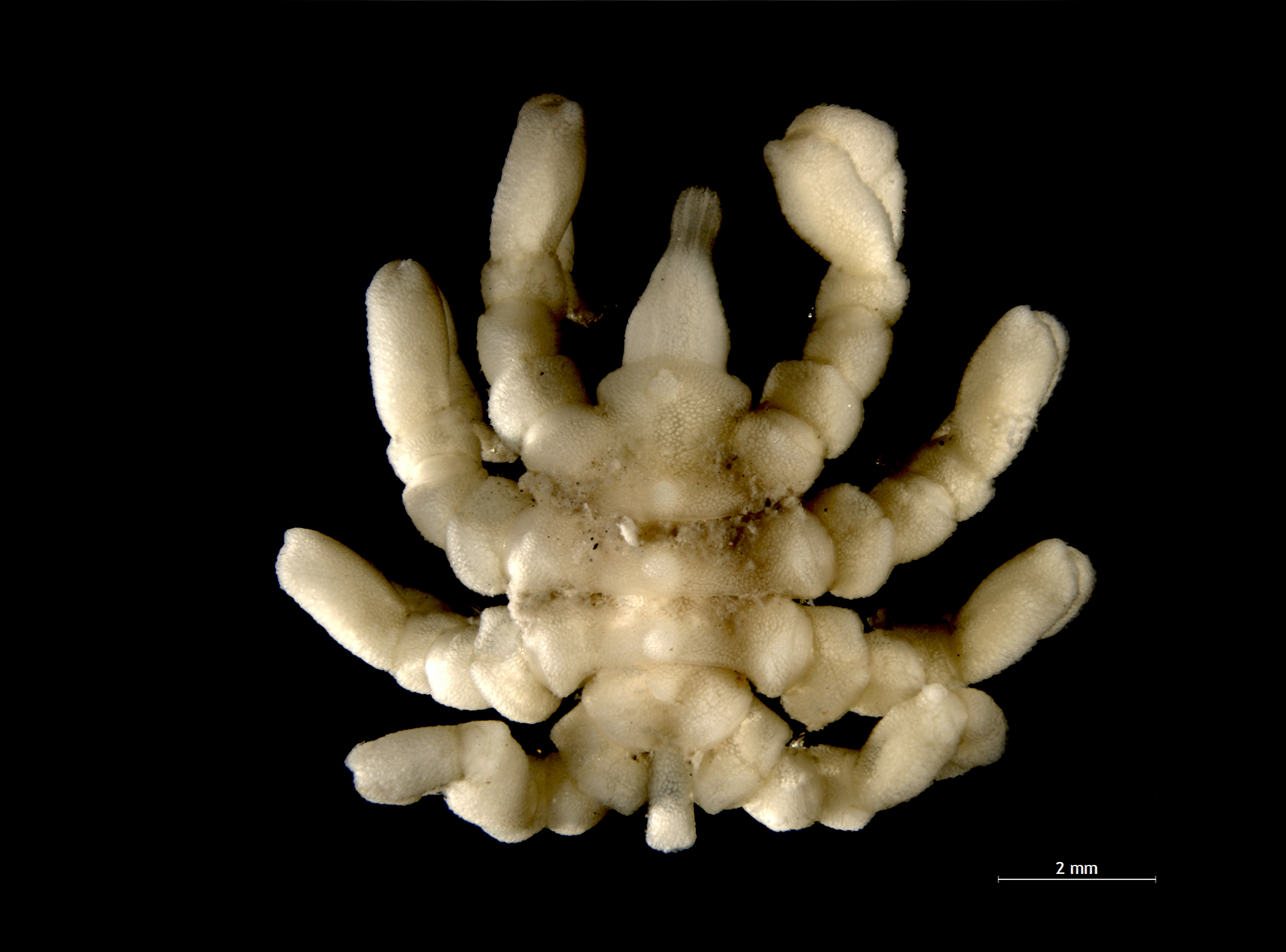

Scientific classification
- Kingdom: Animalia
- Phylum: Arthropoda
- Subphylum: Chelicerata
- Class: Pycnogonida
- Order: Pantopoda
- Family: Pycnogonidae
- Genus: Pycnogonum
- Species: P. litorale

Binomial name
- Pycnogonum litorale (Strøm, 1762)

Synonyms
- Phalangium littorale Strøm, 1762; Pycnogonum balaenarum Linnaeus, 1767

= Pycnogonum litorale =

Species of sea spider

Pycnogonum litorale is a marine arthropod in the family Pycnogonidae, the sea spiders. It is found in the northern Atlantic Ocean, the North Sea, the English Channel and the western Mediterranean Sea.

== Description ==
Pycnogonum litorale has a head, a small slender prosome (thorax) and a tiny opisthosome (abdomen), the trunk being up to 1 cm (0.4 in) in length. The head bears two pairs of eyes and a long, tapering proboscis, and in males, a pair of slender curved appendages called ovigers, which are used in reproduction. The prosome consists of four segments, each bearing a pair of relatively long, robust walking legs which each have nine segments and terminate with a claw; the prosome is too small to house all the internal organs, so these extend into the limbs. The colour of this sea spider is somewhat variable, being yellowish, pale brown or reddish-brown. Males tend to be darker than females, individuals that have recently fed tend to be darker than those that have not, while those that have recently moulted tend to be pale. They grow up to 25mm in overall length.

== Distribution and habitat ==
In the northeastern Atlantic Ocean and the North Sea, Pycnogonum litorale occurs from Arctic Norway southwards to the western Mediterranean Sea. It is also present in the northwestern Atlantic, ranging from the Gulf of St. Lawrence southwards to New York State. It is found on the sea bed, usually on rocky substrates, where its prey are to be found. It has been recorded from the low tide mark down to depths of about 400 m (1,300 ft).

== Ecology ==
Pycnogonum litorale feeds exclusively on Cnidaria, with adults feeding on sea anemones, while juveniles feed on hydroids, such as Clava multicornis. The proboscis is inserted into the prey and some body fluid is sucked out; the sea spider can be considered a parasite rather than a predator, as the food source is not killed; sea anemones that are targeted include Actinia equina, Anemonia viridis, Calliactis parasitica and Metridium dianthus. The green shore crab (Carcinus maenas) feeds on sea spiders, but avoids Pycnogonum litorale because it produces two hormones (20-Hydroxyecdysone) which disrupt the crab's ecdysis (moulting).

The sexes are separate in this sea spider, and reproduction occurs between spring and autumn. The process is initiated by the male clinging to the female above her head, which stimulates her to expel her eggs from orifices at the base of her legs. The male scoops these up with his ovigers, fertilises them and secures them to his underside. Here he broods them for about three weeks until they are ready to hatch. The protonymphon-type larvae have three pairs of legs, and will develop a fourth pair at metamorphosis.
