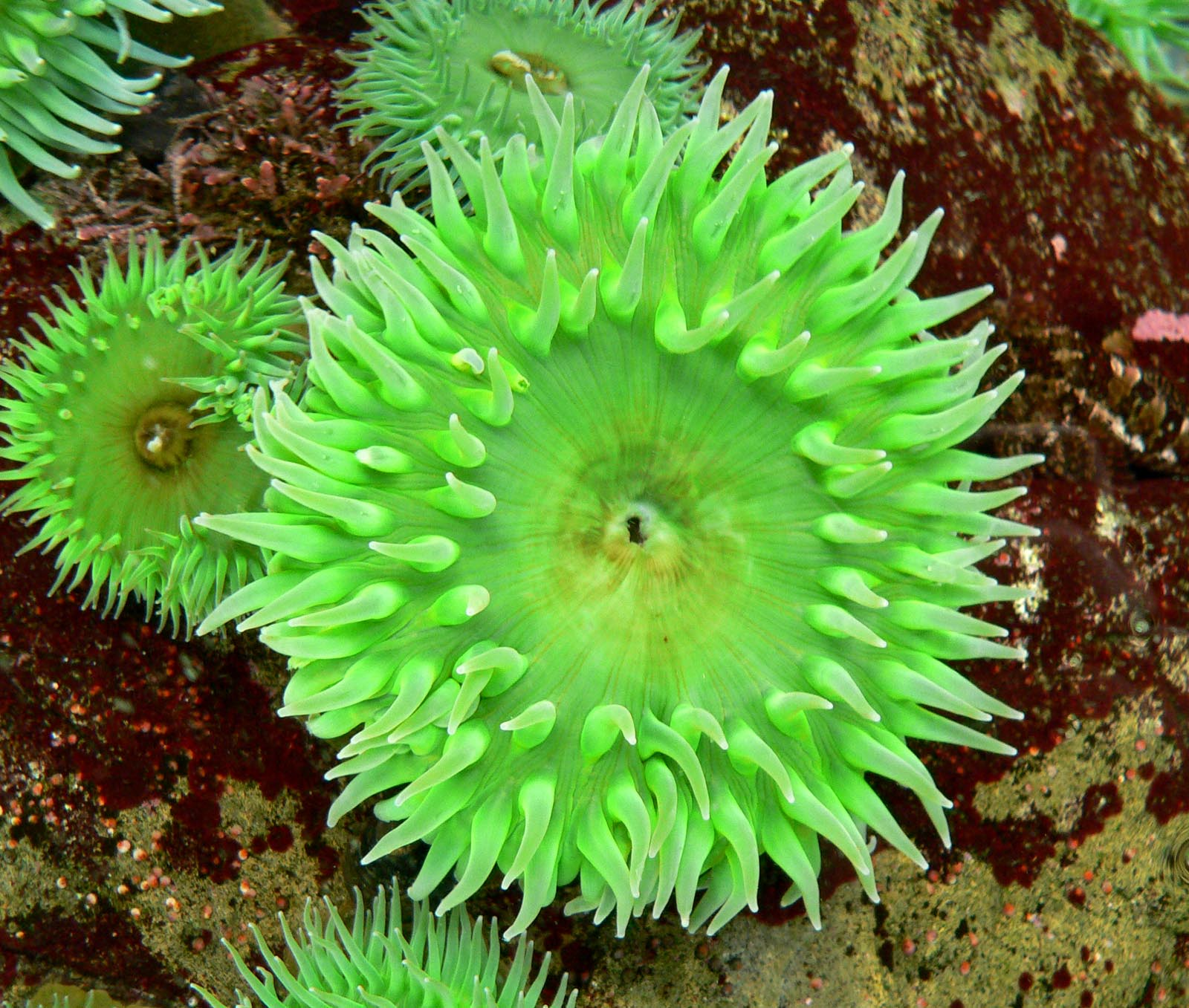
- Anthopleura xanthogrammica

Scientific classification
- Kingdom: Animalia
- Phylum: Cnidaria
- Subphylum: Anthozoa
- Class: Hexacorallia
- Order: Actiniaria
- Family: Actiniidae
- Genus: Anthopleura
- Species: A. xanthogrammica

Binomial name
- Anthopleura xanthogrammica (Brandt, 1835)

= Anthopleura xanthogrammica =

Species of coral

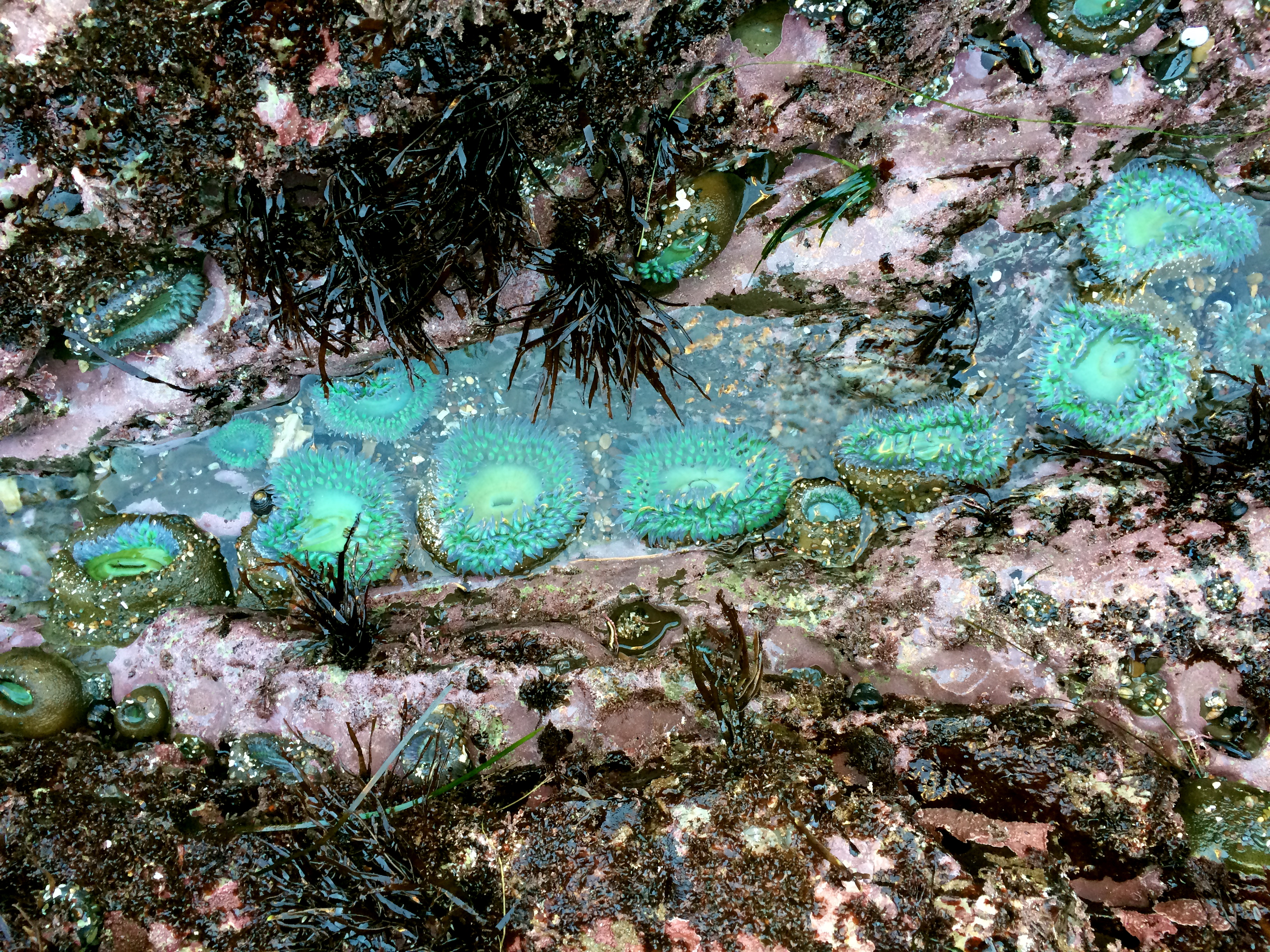
Spectacular lineup of Giant Greens at Hazard Reef, Montana de Oro State Park. Channel is about a foot (30cm) wide. It drains a large tidepool which supplies abundant good food.

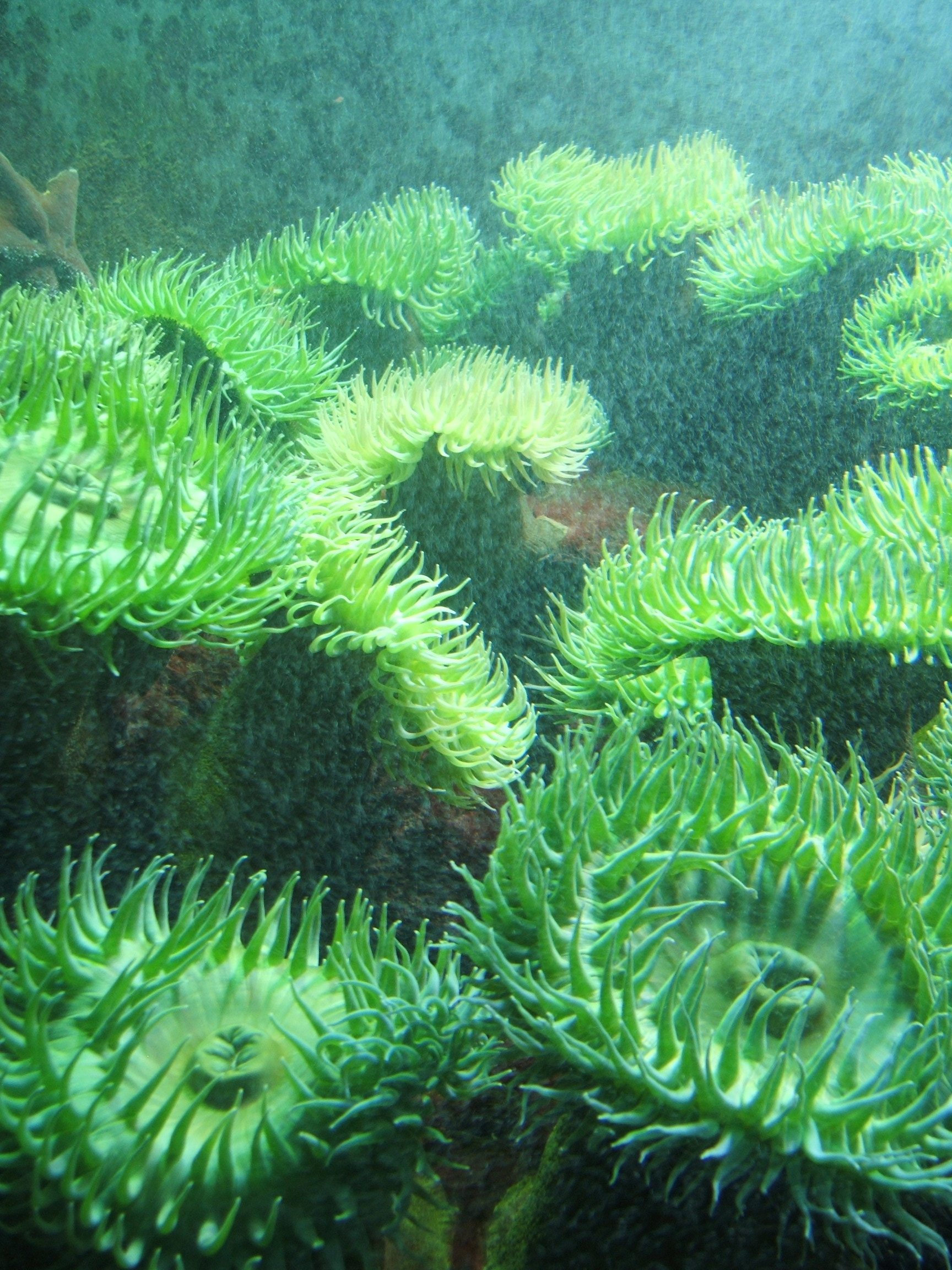
Giant Greens at New England Aquarium

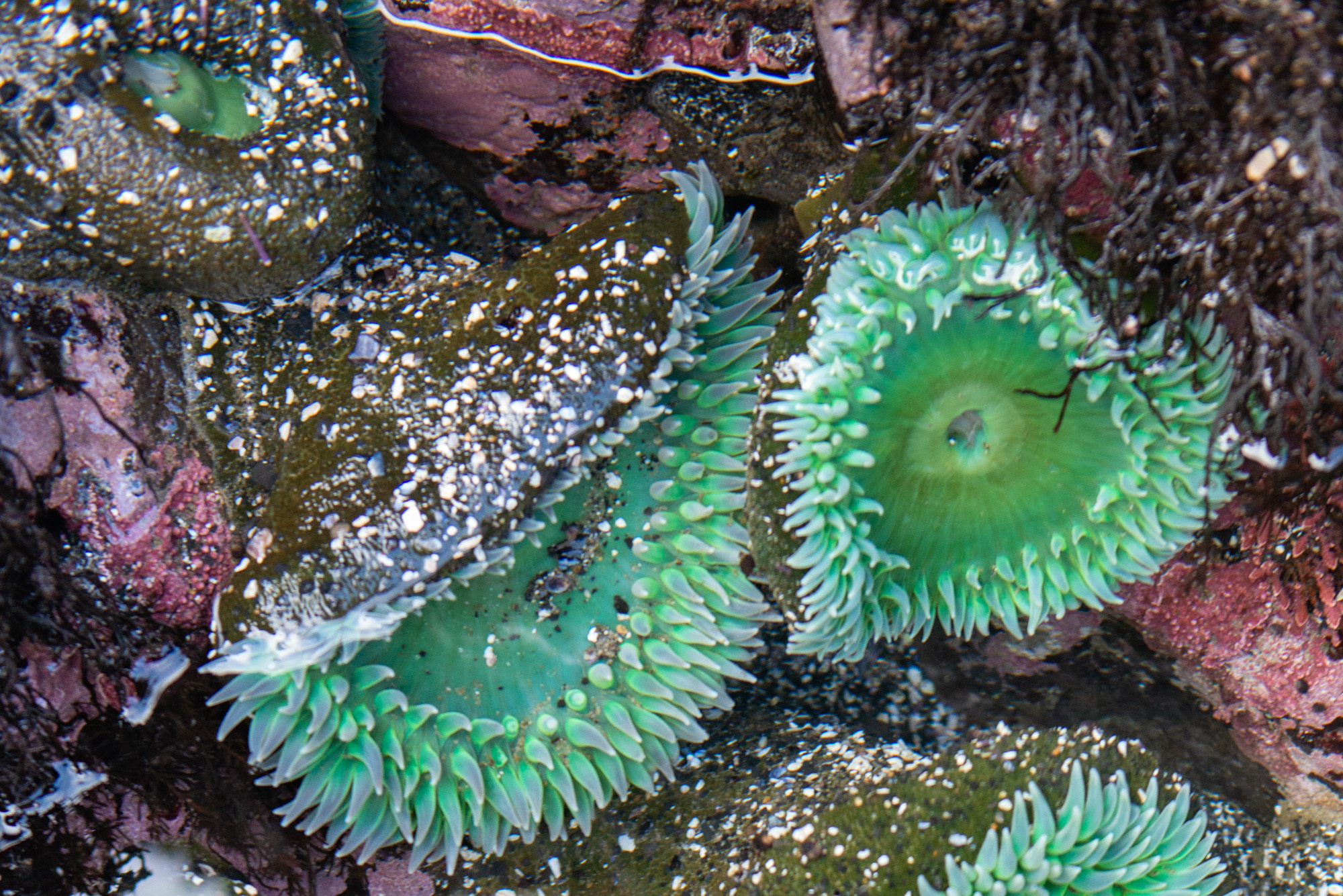
Giant Greens at Yaquina Head Outstanding Natural Area, Oregon.

Anthopleura xanthogrammica, or the giant green anemone, is a species of intertidal sea anemone of the family Actiniidae.

Other common names for this anemone include green surf anemone, giant green sea anemone, green anemone, giant tidepool anemone, anemone, and rough anemone.

== Description ==
The column width and height can reach a maximum of 17.5 and 30 cm, respectively. The crown of tentacles can be as wide as 25 cm in diameter, while the column, itself, tends to be widest at the base in order to offer a more stable connection to the rocks.

It has a broad, flat oral disk surface and no striping, banding, or other markings.

== Coloration ==
If A. xanthogrammica is exposed to proper amounts of sunlight, it can appear bright green when submerged under water.

When not submerged, it appears dark green or brown. This is because the anemone tends to close up and "droop" and its now exposed column is actually dark green and slightly brown, but the hidden tentacles and oral disk are bright green.

=== Tentacles ===
The tentacles, which are short and conical, are arranged in six or more rows surrounding the oral disk and can be pointed or blunt at the tips.

== Distribution ==
Generally, A. xanthogrammica is found along the low to mid intertidal zones of the Pacific Ocean, from Alaska to southern California and sometimes downwards to Panama, where cold water swells can occur.

== Habitat ==
A. xanthogrammica prefers to inhabit sandy or rocky shorelines, where water remains for most of the day. They can generally be found in tide pools up to 15 m deep. Occasionally A. xanthogrammica can also be found in deep channels of more exposed rocky shores and concrete pilings in bays and harbors.

== Biology and natural history ==
Photosynthetic algae, zoochlorellae, and the dinoflagellates, zooxanthellae, live in the epidermis and tissue of the gut of A. xanthogrammica. In this symbiotic relationship, the zoochlorellae and zooxanthellae provide nutrients to the anemone via photosynthesis and contribute to the bright green color of the anemone's oral disk and tentacles. The bright green color is also due to pigmentation.

Anthopleura xanthogrammica anemones living in caves and shady zones have reduced or no natural symbionts and tend to be less colorful.

=== Behavior ===
These anemones tend to live a solitary life, but can be occasionally seen as groups with no less than 14 individuals per square meter. They can move slowly using their basal disks, but usually stay sessile. Like other anemones, A. xanthogrammica can use stinging cells located in the tentacles as protection from predators and a mechanism to capture prey.

=== Reproduction ===
Anthopleura xanthogrammica reproduce sexually via external fertilization of sperm and eggs in the late fall. Newly formed pelagic, planktotrophic larvae float in the water until dispersing and settling in mussel beds.

=== Feeding ===
Nematocysts found in the tentacles assist A. xanthogrammica to catch and paralyze prey. After feeding and digestion is complete, the anemone excretes its waste back through the mouth opening.

== Predators and prey ==
Main predators of A. xanthogrammica include: the leather seastar Dermasterias imbricata, the nudibranch Aeolidia papillosa and the snail Epitonium tinctum (both feed on the tentacles), and the snails Opalia chacei and Opalia funiculata and the sea spider Pycnogonum stearnsi (that feed on the column).

The anemone feeds on sea urchins, small fish, and crabs, but detached mussels seem to be the main food source. There are rare instances where the giant green anemone has consumed seabirds. It is not known whether the birds were alive or dead when engulfed by the anemone.

== Similar species ==
Occasionally, A. xanthogrammica can be confused with large individuals of A. elegantissima or A. sola, but both of these other anemones have (usually) pink-tipped tentacles and a striped oral disk, unlike A.xanthogrammica.
