= Tide pool =

Rocky pool on a seashore, separated from the sea at low tide, filled with seawater

A tide pool in Porto Covo, west coast of Portugal

A tide pool or rock pool is a shallow pool of seawater that forms on the rocky intertidal shore. These pools typically range from a few inches to a few feet deep and a few feet across. Many of these pools exist as separate bodies of water only at low tide, as seawater gets trapped when the tide recedes. Tides are caused by the gravitational pull of the sun and moon. A tidal cycle is usually about 25 hours and consists of two high tides and two low tides.

Tide pool habitats are home to especially adaptable animals, like snails, barnacles, mussels, anemones, urchins, sea stars, crustaceans, octopus, and small fish, as well as seaweed. Inhabitants must be able to cope with constantly changing water levels, water temperatures, salinity, and oxygen content. At low tide, there is the risk of predators like seabirds. These pools have engaged the attention of naturalists and marine biologists, as well as philosophical essayists: John Steinbeck wrote in The Log from the Sea of Cortez, "It is advisable to look from the tide pool to the stars and then back to the tide pool."

Tidal pools are theorized to be one possible environment where life on Earth originated, with the chemical reactions needed for life's beginnings potentially occurring in these shallow, dynamic environments. Additionally, the conditions within tidal pools, such as the presence of fluctuating water levels and unique chemical concentrations, may have also driven the evolution of land-walking vertebrates from ancient fish approximately 400 million years ago.

Some examples have been artificially augmented to enable safer swimming (for example without waves or without sharks) in seawater at certain states of the tide.

Tidepooling is an educational and recreational activity in which people visit tidepools formed during low tide to view the rock formations and living organisms they contain. Unlike scuba diving or other underwater ways of viewing undersea life, tidepooling is a low-risk activity that does not require expensive equipment or extensive logistics.

== Zones ==
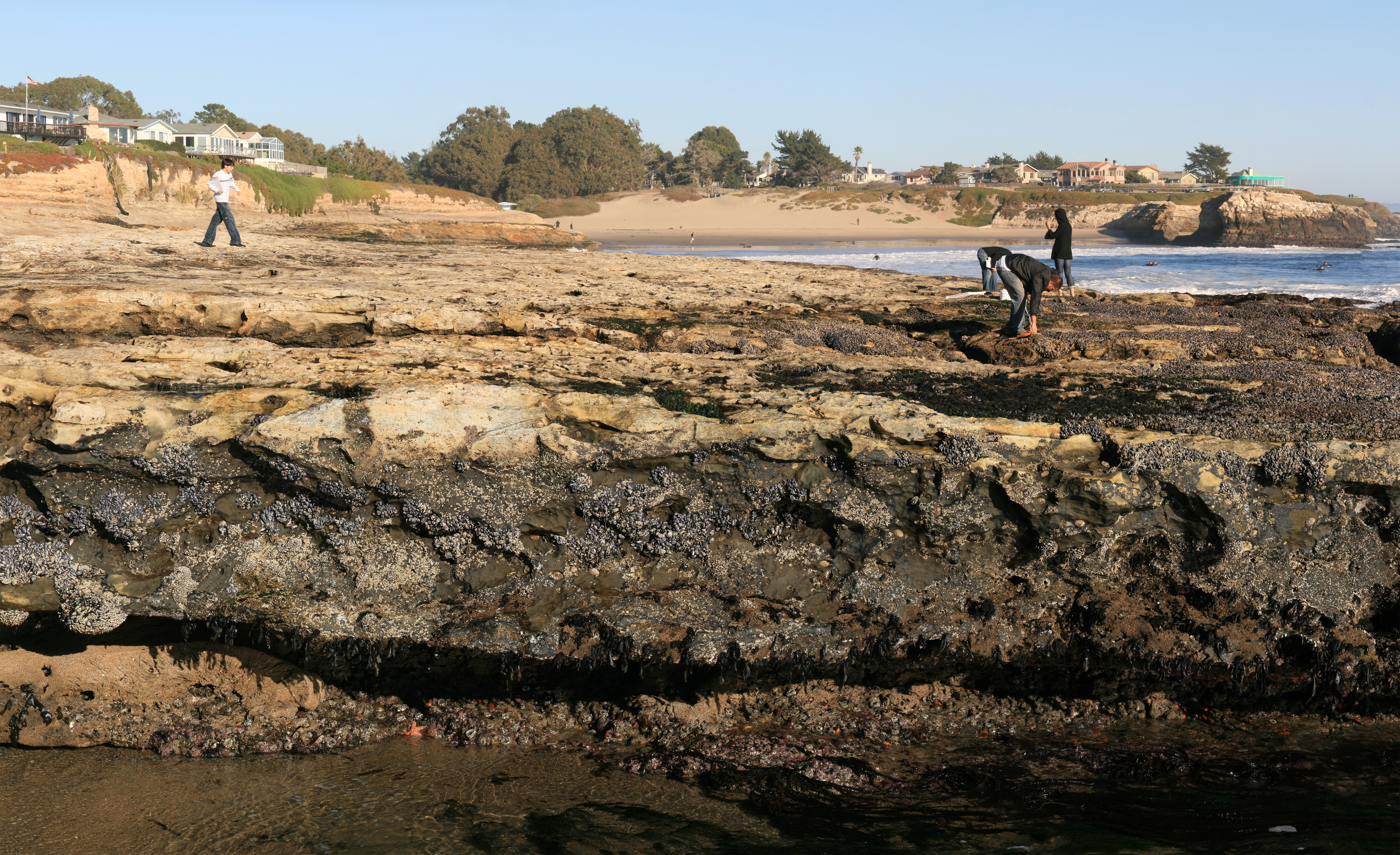
Tide pools in Santa Cruz, California from spray/splash zone to low tide zone

The rocky shoreline exhibits distinct zones with unique characteristics. These zones are created by the tidal movements of water along the rocky shores from high to low-tide. They are:

- The supralittoral zone or splash zone: area above the high-tide mark, which is virtually a terrestrial environment. Occasionally gets splashed, but never gets covered by the ocean.
- The intertidal fringe: area around the high-tide mark.
- The intertidal or littoral zone: area between the high and low-tide marks. Can be further divided into high, mid, and low intertidal zones, which are explained below in more depth.
- The sublittoral or subtidal zone: area below the low-tide mark.

The presence and abundance of flora and fauna vary between zones along the rocky shore. This is due to niche adaptations in response to the varying tides and solar exposure.

Tide pools exist in the intertidal zone (the area within the tidal range), which is submerged by the sea at high tides and during storms. At other times, the rocks may undergo other extreme conditions, such as baking in the sun or being exposed to cold winds. Few organisms can survive such harsh conditions.

=== High tide zone ===
The high tide zone is flooded during each high tide, which occurs once or twice daily. Organisms must survive wave action, currents, and long exposure to the sun and open air. This zone is predominantly inhabited by seaweed and invertebrates, such as sea anemones, starfish, chitons, crabs, green algae, and mussels. Marine algae provide shelter for nudibranchs and hermit crabs. The same waves and currents that make life in the high tide zone difficult bring food to filter feeders and other intertidal organisms.

=== Mid tide zone ===
This zone is constantly covered and uncovered by water, so its inhabitants have adapted to surviving in these conditions. More plants and animals live here, compared to the high tide zone, because they are not exposed to drying conditions for so long. During low tide, anemones close up and can cover themselves in shells and mussels close their shells to keep in moisture. They reopen when the tide returns and brings them food.

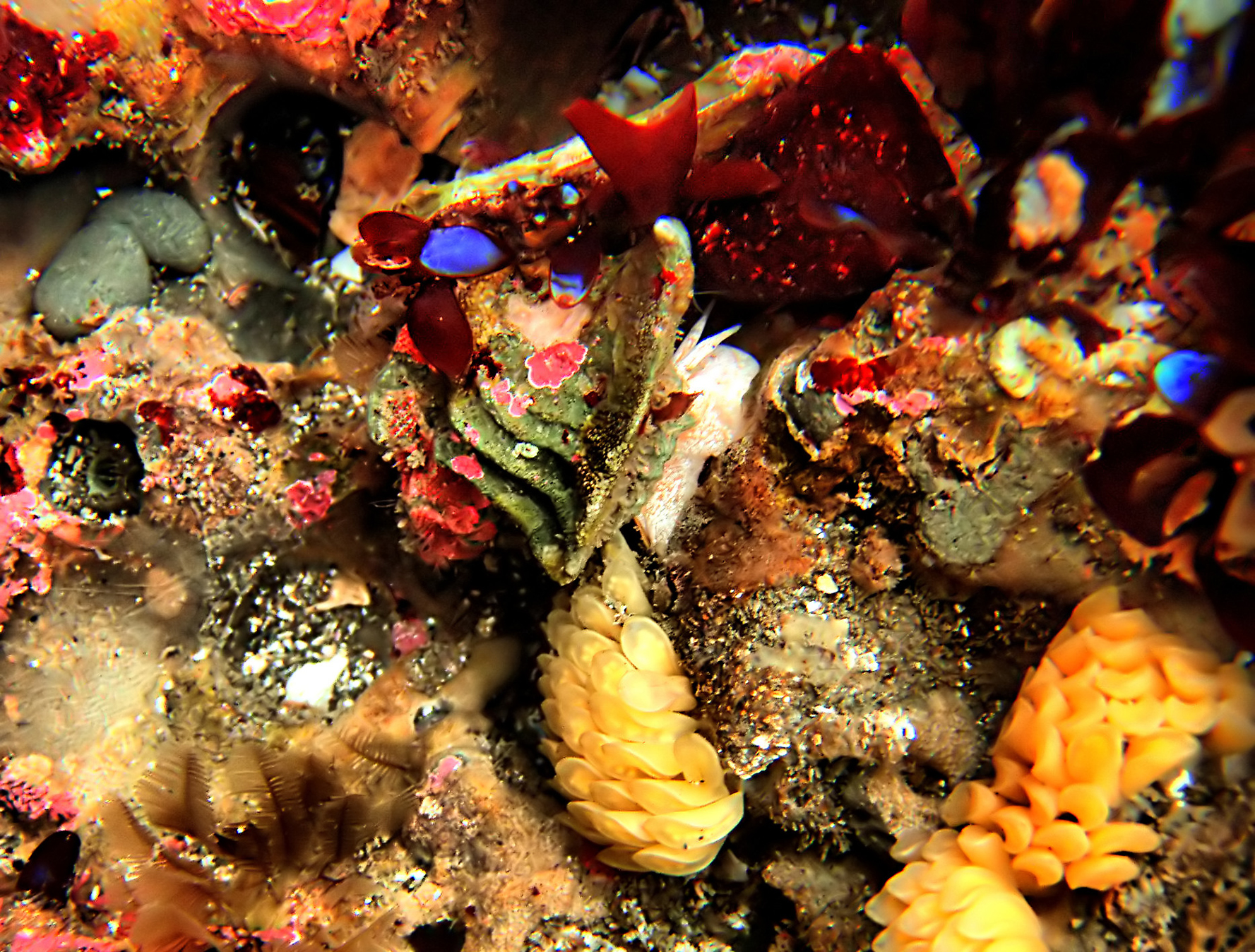
Low tide zone in a tide pool

=== Low tide zone ===
This area is mostly submerged and is exposed only during unusually low tide. It usually teems with life and has far more marine vegetation, especially seaweeds. Organisms in this zone do not have to be as well adapted to drying out and temperature extremes. Low tide zone organisms include abalone, anemones, brown seaweed, chitons, crabs, green algae, hydroids, isopods, limpets, mussels, and sometimes even small vertebrates such as fish. Seaweeds provide shelter for many animals, like sea slugs and urchins that are too fragile for other zones. These creatures can grow to larger sizes because there is more available energy and better water coverage: the water is shallow enough to allow additional sunlight for photosynthetic activity, with almost normal levels of salinity. This area is also relatively protected from large predators because of the wave action and shallow water.

== Marine life ==
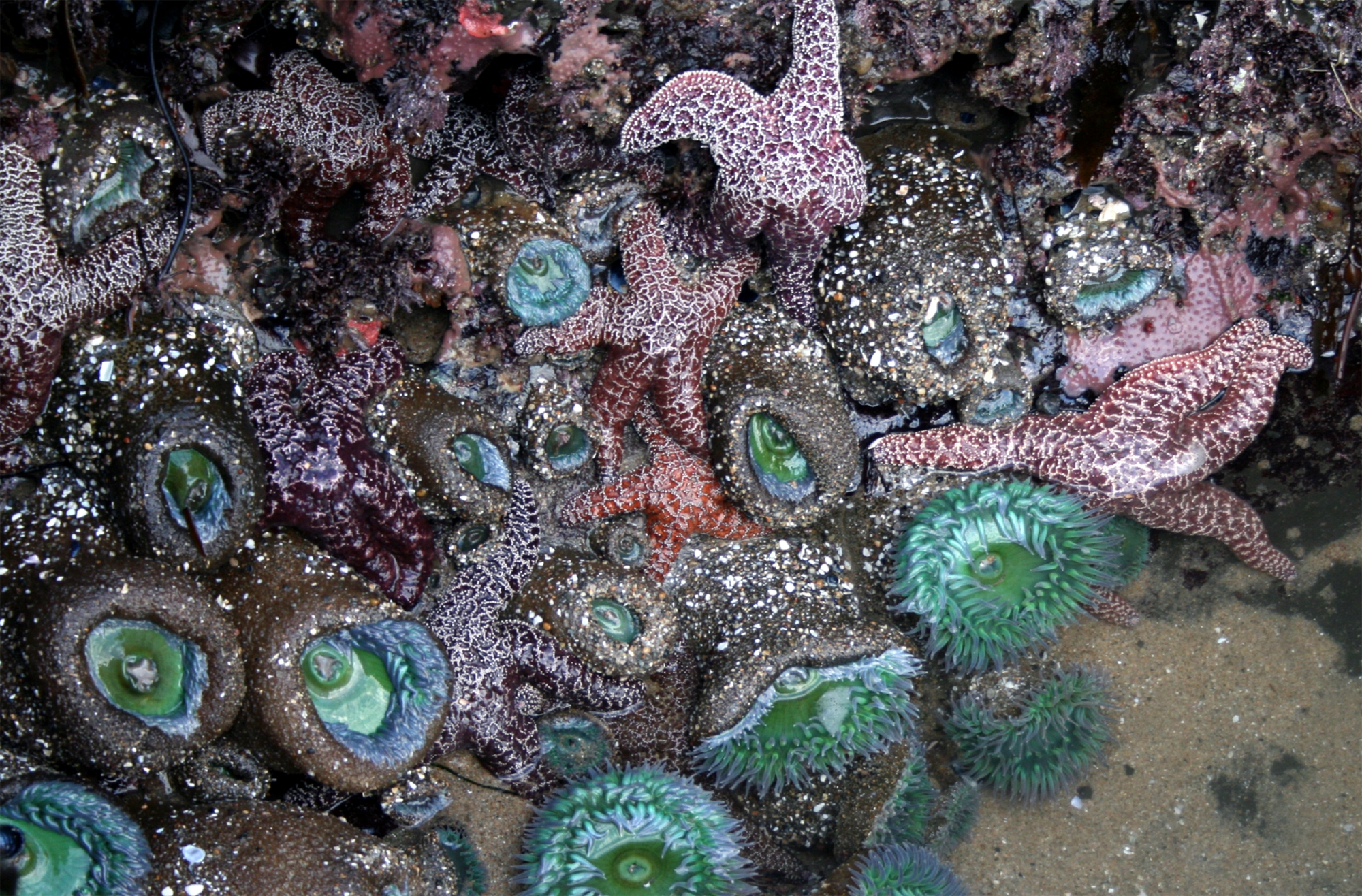
The site of a tide pool in Santa Cruz, California showing starfish, sea anemones, and sea sponges.

Tide pools provide a home for many organisms such as sea stars, mussels and clams. Inhabitants deal with a frequently changing environment: fluctuations in water temperature, salinity, and oxygen content. Hazards include waves, strong currents, exposure to midday sun and predators.

Waves can dislodge mussels and draw them out to sea. Gulls pick up and drop sea urchins to break them open. Sea stars prey on mussels and are eaten by gulls themselves. Black bears are known to sometimes feast on intertidal creatures at low tide. Although tide pool organisms must avoid getting washed away into the ocean, drying up in the sun, or being eaten, they depend on the tide pool's constant changes for food. Tide pools contain complex food webs that can vary based on the climate.

=== Fauna ===
The sea anemone Anthopleura elegantissima reproduces clones of itself through a process of longitudinal fission, in which the animal splits into two parts along its length. The sea anemone Anthopleura sola often engages in territorial fights. The white tentacles (acrorhagi), which contain stinging cells, are for fighting. The sea anemones sting each other repeatedly until one of them moves.

Some species of sea stars can regenerate lost arms. Most species must retain an intact central part of the body to be able to regenerate, but a few can regrow from a single ray. The regeneration of these stars is possible because the vital organs are in the arms.

Sea urchins move around tide pools with tube-like feet. Different species of urchin have different colors, and many are seen in tide pools. With their spines that protect them from predators, they allow the urchins to feed almost undisturbed in tide pools. The spines of some species, such as Toxopneustes pileolus, are toxic, capable of delivering an extremely painful sting when touched. Algae and other microorganisms are the food sources that attract the urchins to the tide pools.

The presence of the California mussel increases the supply of inorganic nitrogen and phosphorus in coastal marine tide pools which allows the ecosystem the nutrients to be more productive. The shell of a California mussel is primarily composed of aragonite and calcite which are both polymorphs of calcium carbonate. Climate change and ocean acidification has led to a decrease in these amounts important compounds in California Mussel shells over many years.

Lichens and barnacles live in the splash zone. Different barnacle species live at very tightly constrained elevations, with tidal conditions precisely determining the exact height of an assemblage relative to sea level. The intertidal zone is periodically exposed to sun and wind, conditions that can cause barnacles to become desiccated. These animals, therefore, need to be well adapted to water loss. Their calcite shells are impermeable, and they possess two plates which they slide across their mouth opening when not feeding. These plates also protect against predation.

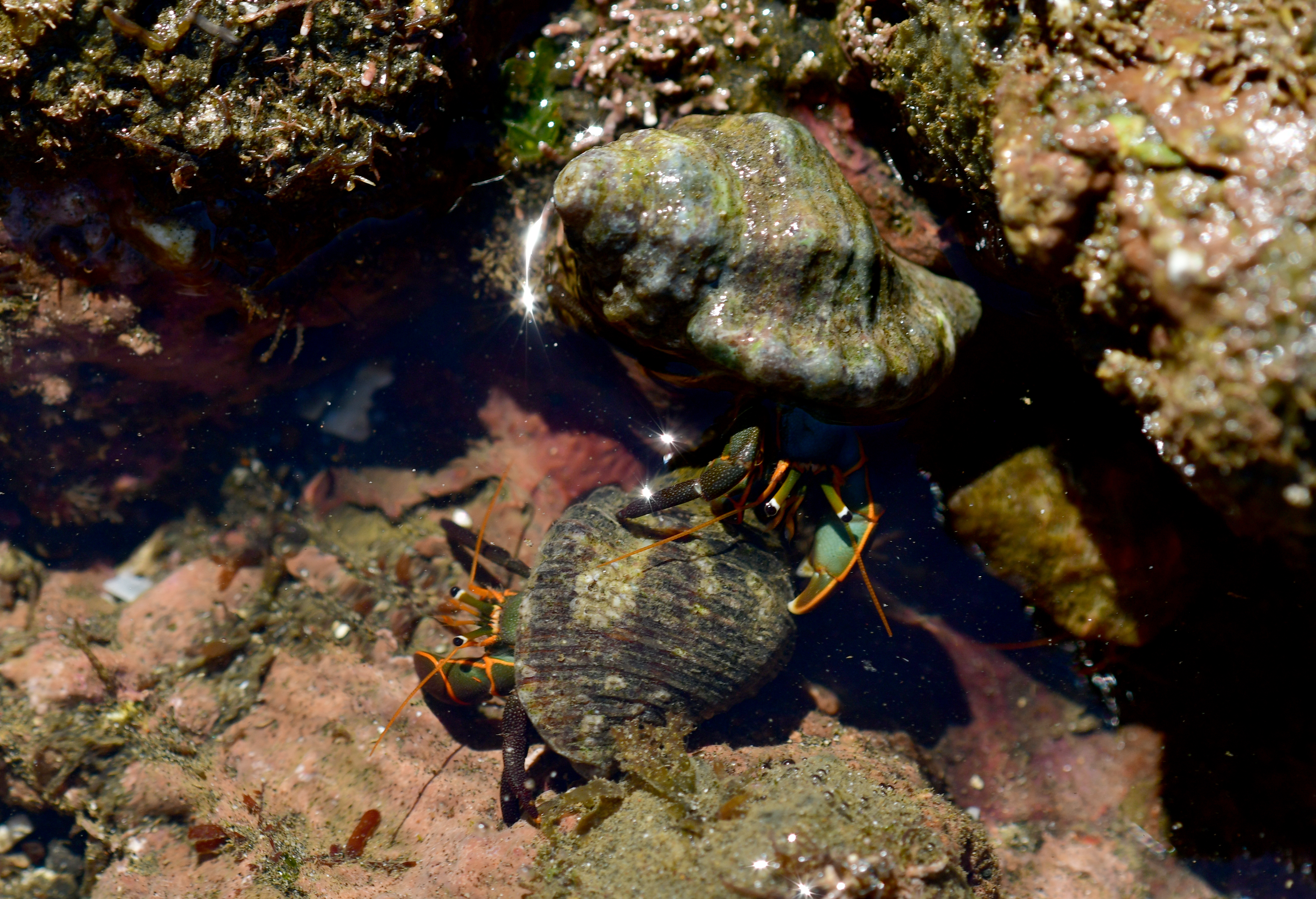
Hermit crabs in a tide pool

Many species of hermit crab are commonly found in tide pool environments. The long-wristed hermit crab (Pagurus longicarpus) has been found to become stranded in tide pools and are forced to inhabit gastropod shells in response to the rapidly changing temperature of the pools. Hermit crabs of different or the same species compete for the snail shells that are available.

Many fish species can live in tidepools. Tidepool fishes are those inhabiting the intertidal zone during part or the entirety of their life cycle, including residents displaying morphological, physiological and behavioral adaptations to withstand the fluctuating environment and non-residents that use the intertidal as juvenile habitat, feeding or refuge ground, or as transient space between nearshore areas. Tidepool fishes can be classified as residents and non-residents (sometimes called transients or visitors). Residents are those that spend the whole lifetime in the tidepools. Non-resident species are commonly divided into two groups: secondary residents (also known as partial residents or opportunists) and transients (which can be further classified as tidal and seasonal transients). Secondary residents are species that spend only a portion of their life history in tidepools, typically during their juvenile stage, before moving on to adult subtidal habitats. Transients, on the other hand, may temporarily inhabit tidepools for various reasons such as foraging, seeking refuge, or transit. Unlike residents, transients lack specialized adaptations for intertidal life and typically occupy large tidepools for a relatively short period, ranging from a single tidal cycle to a few months. The tidepool sculpin is a species of fish that is named for its tide pool habitat. The tidepool sculpin has been found to show preferences for certain tide pools and will return to their tide pool of choice after being removed from it. This is a behavior known as homing. These fish crawl on the floor of tide pools using a back and forth movement of their tail fin and a rotating motion of their pectoral fins.

Multiple species of Amphipods (Amphipoda) can be found in coastal tide pools. These small crustaceans provide an important food source for predator species as well as limiting the growth of algae attached to vegetation.

=== Flora ===
Sea palms (Postelsia) look similar to miniature palm trees. They live in the middle to upper intertidal zones in areas with greater wave action. High wave action may increase nutrient availability and move the blades of the thallus, allowing more sunlight to reach the organism so that it can photosynthesize. In addition, the constant wave action removes competitors, such as the mussel species Mytilus californianus.

Recent studies have shown that Postelsia grows in greater numbers when such competition exists; a control group with no competition produced fewer offspring than an experimental group with mussels; from this it is thought that the mussels provide protection for the developing gametophytes. Alternatively, the mussels may prevent the growth of competing algae such as Corallina or Halosaccion, allowing Postelsia to grow freely after wave action has eliminated the mussels.

Coralline algae "Corallinales" are predominant features of mid and low intertidal tide pools. Calcium carbonate (CaCO_{3}) takes the form of calcite in their cell walls providing them with a hard outer shell. This shell protects from herbivores and desiccation due to lack of water and evaporation. Many forms of the Coralline algae bring herbivores, such as mollusks "Notoacmea", to the tide pools during high tides, increasing the biomass of the area. Once low tide comes, these herbivores are exposed to carnivores in the areas, fueling the food web.

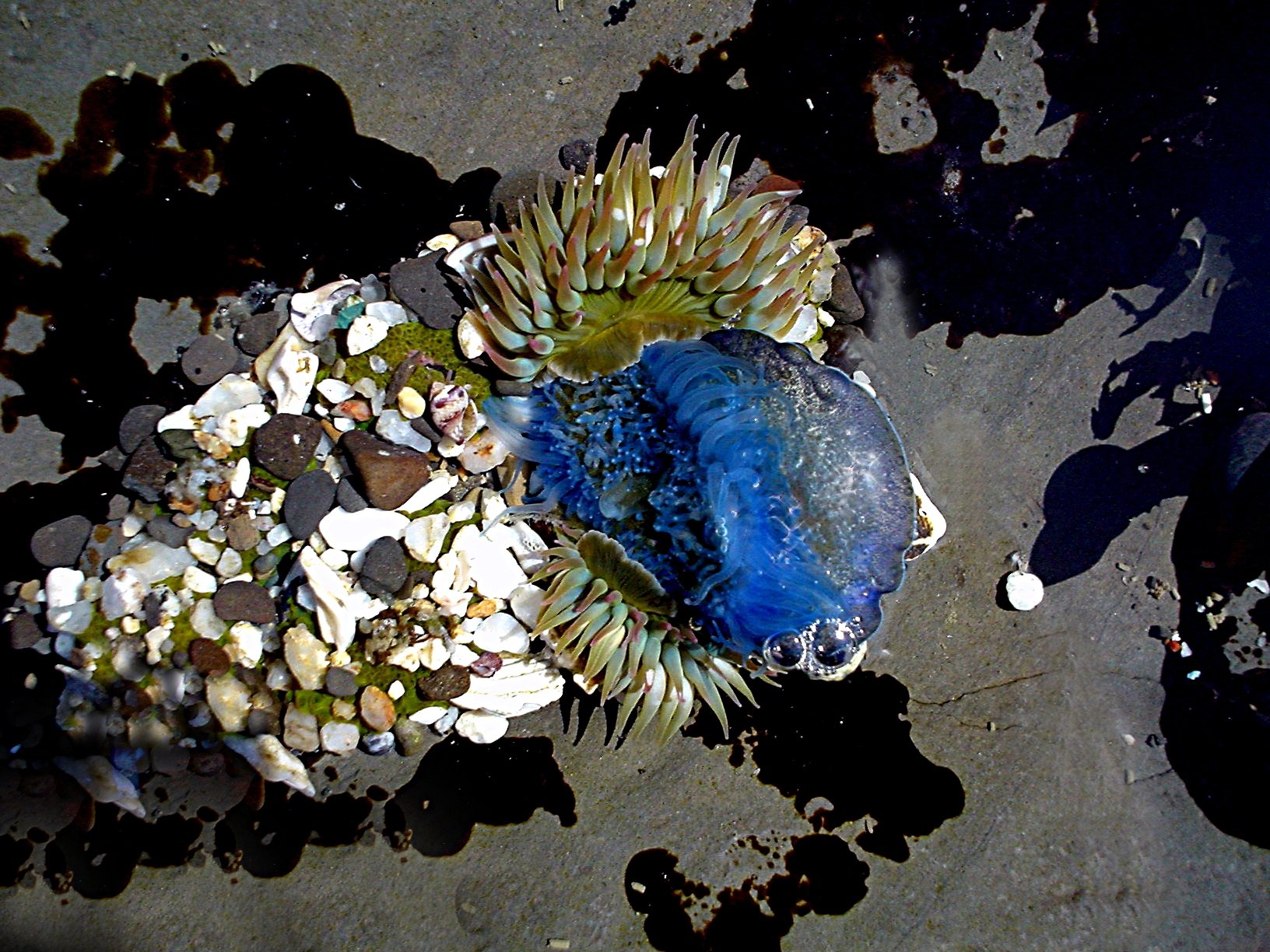
A starburst anemone (Anthopleura sola) consuming a by-the-wind-sailor (Velella velella), a blue hydrozoan

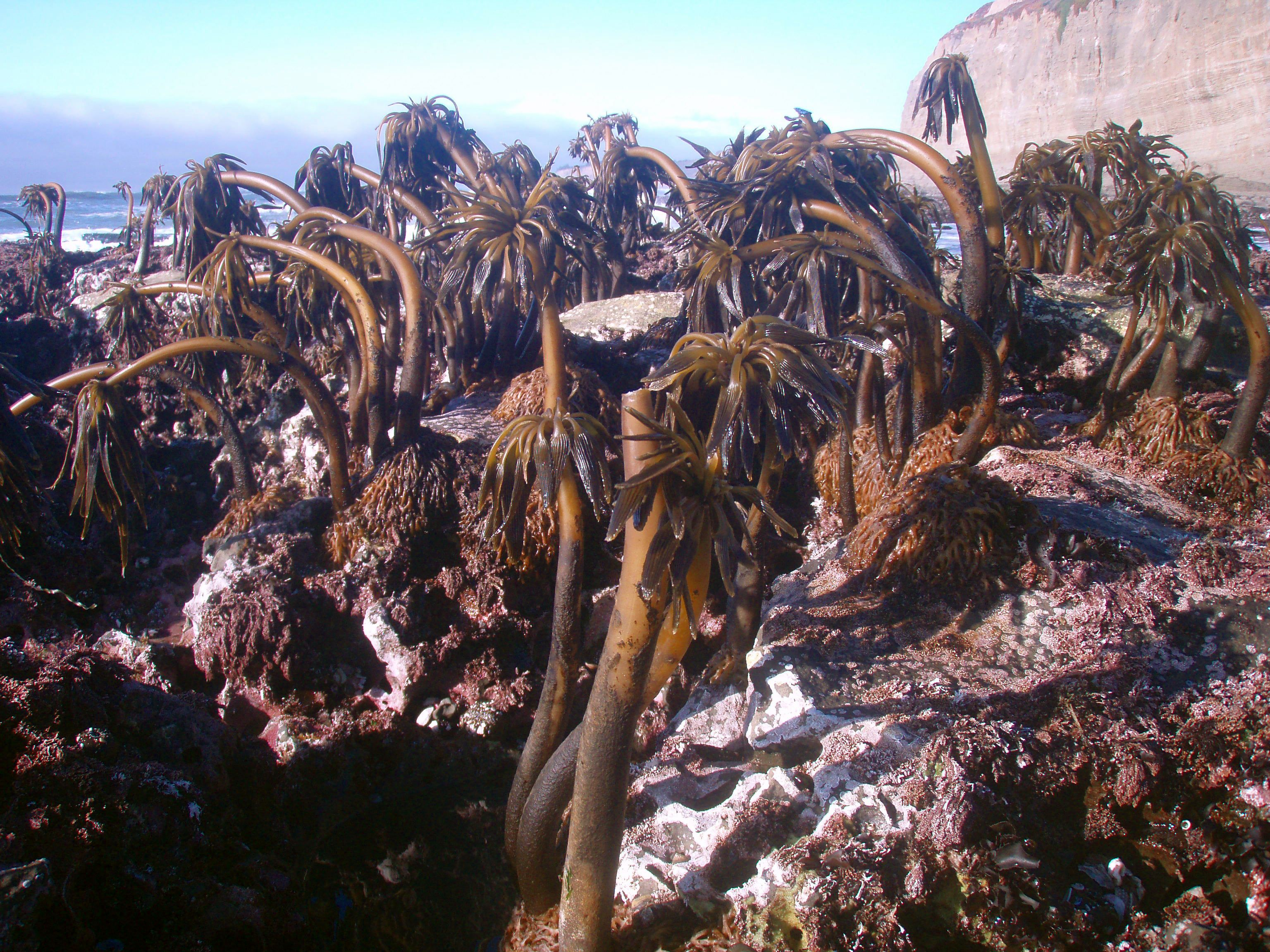
Postelsia palmaeformis at low tide in a tide pool

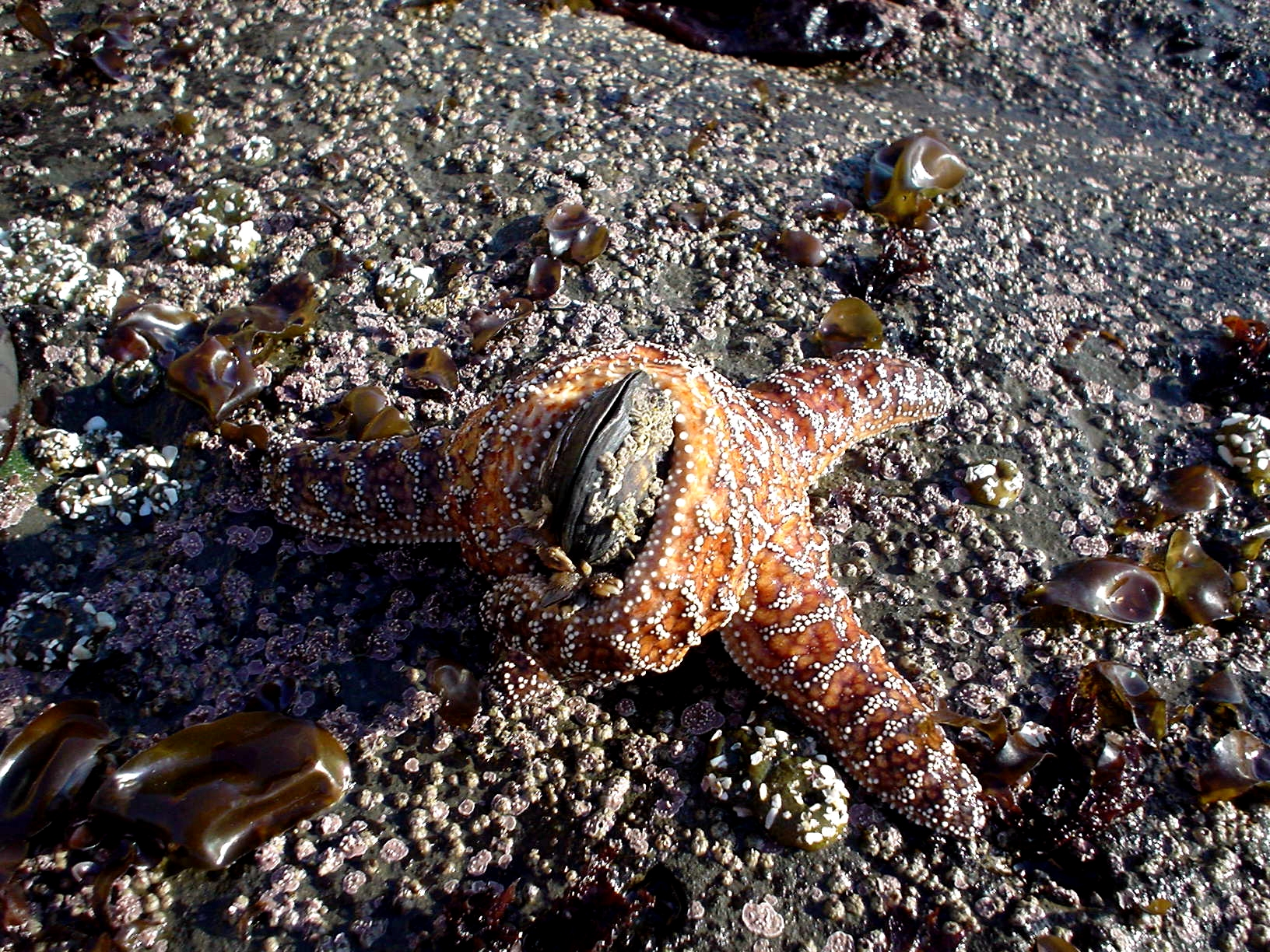
Sea star, Pisaster ochraceus consuming a mussel in tide pools

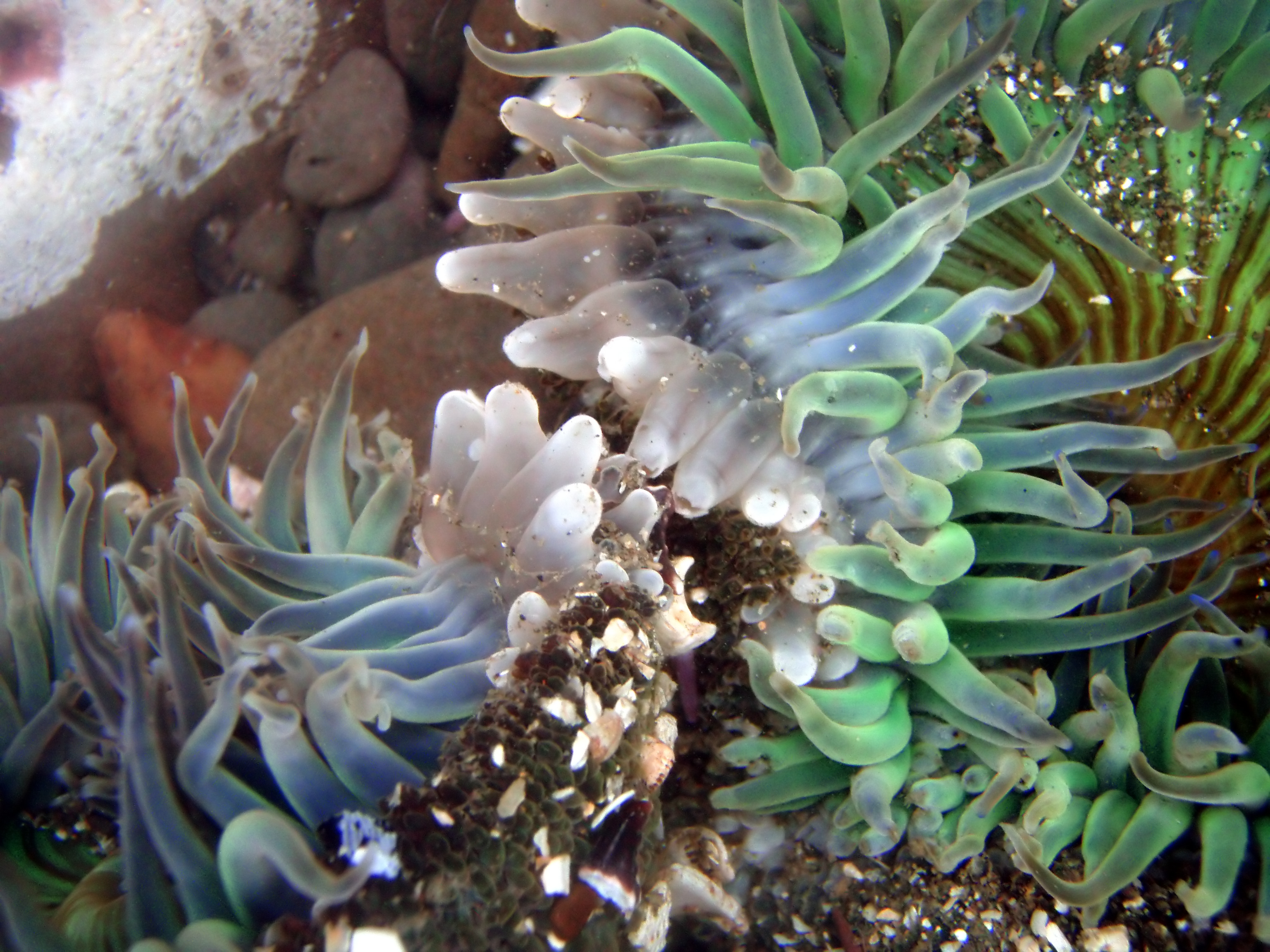
Sea anemones, Anthopleura sola engaged in a battle for territory

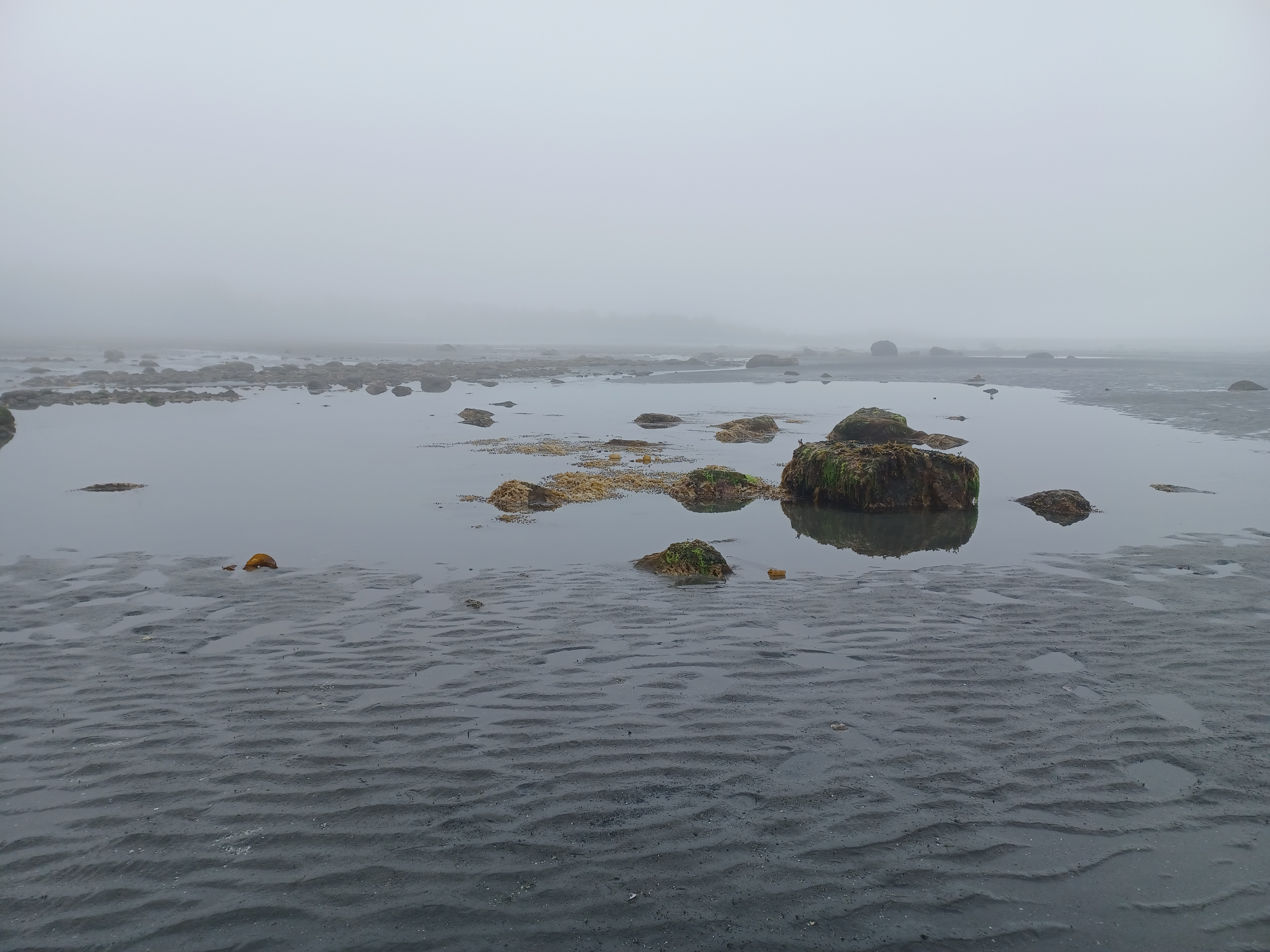
Temporary tide pool at an extreme low tide, Kachemak Bay, Alaska

=== Coastal predators ===
Tide pools are often surrounded by coastal predators who feed on tide pool flora and fauna. These predators play an important role in the tide pool food web and create competition for resources.

== See also ==
- Intertidal fish
- List of British Isles rockpool life
- Rocky shore
- Sydney inter-tidal rock pools
