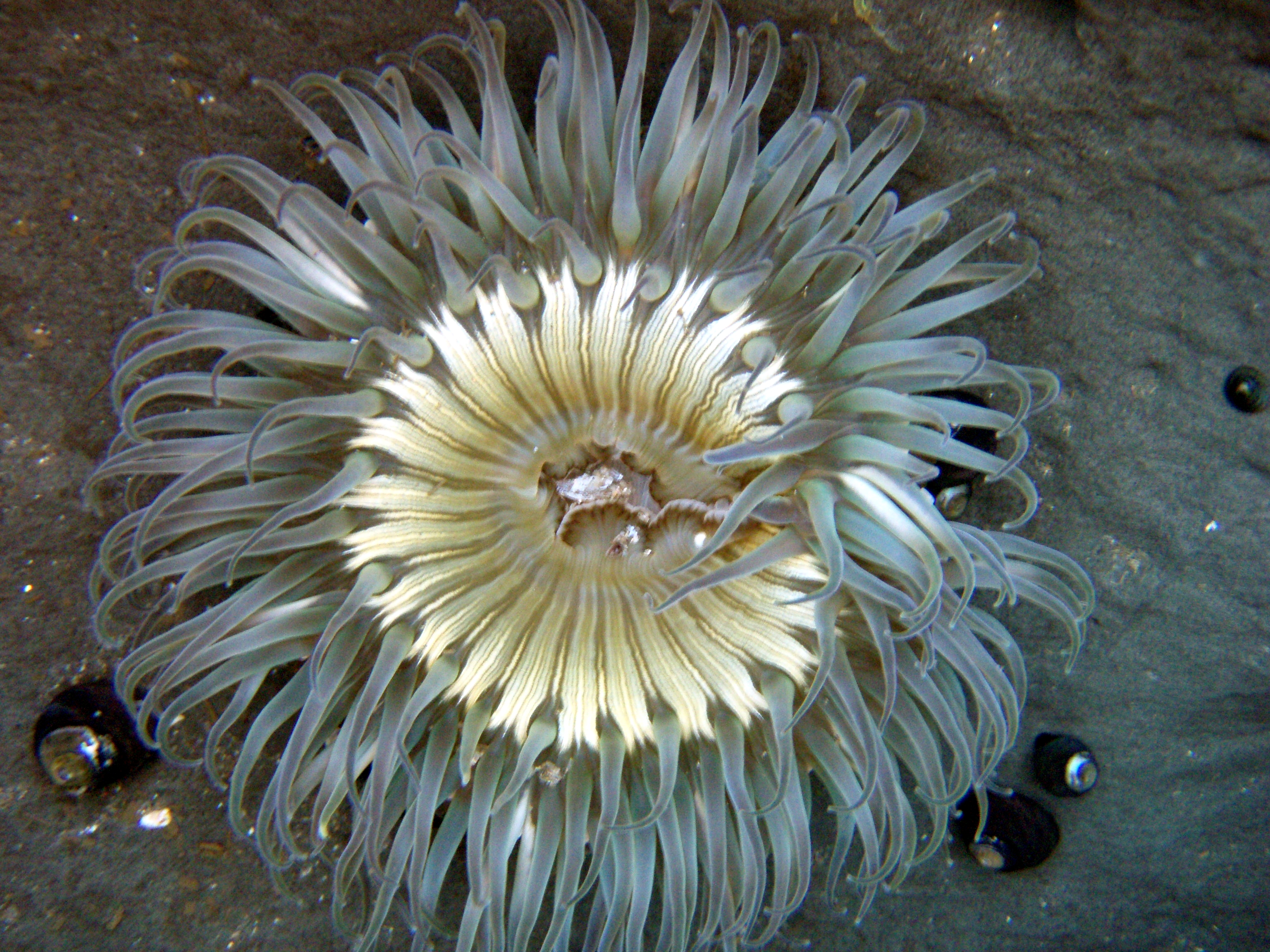

Scientific classification
- Kingdom: Animalia
- Phylum: Cnidaria
- Subphylum: Anthozoa
- Class: Hexacorallia
- Order: Actiniaria
- Family: Actiniidae
- Genus: Anthopleura
- Species: A. sola

Binomial name
- Anthopleura sola Pearse & Francis, 2000

= Starburst anemone =

Species of sea anemone

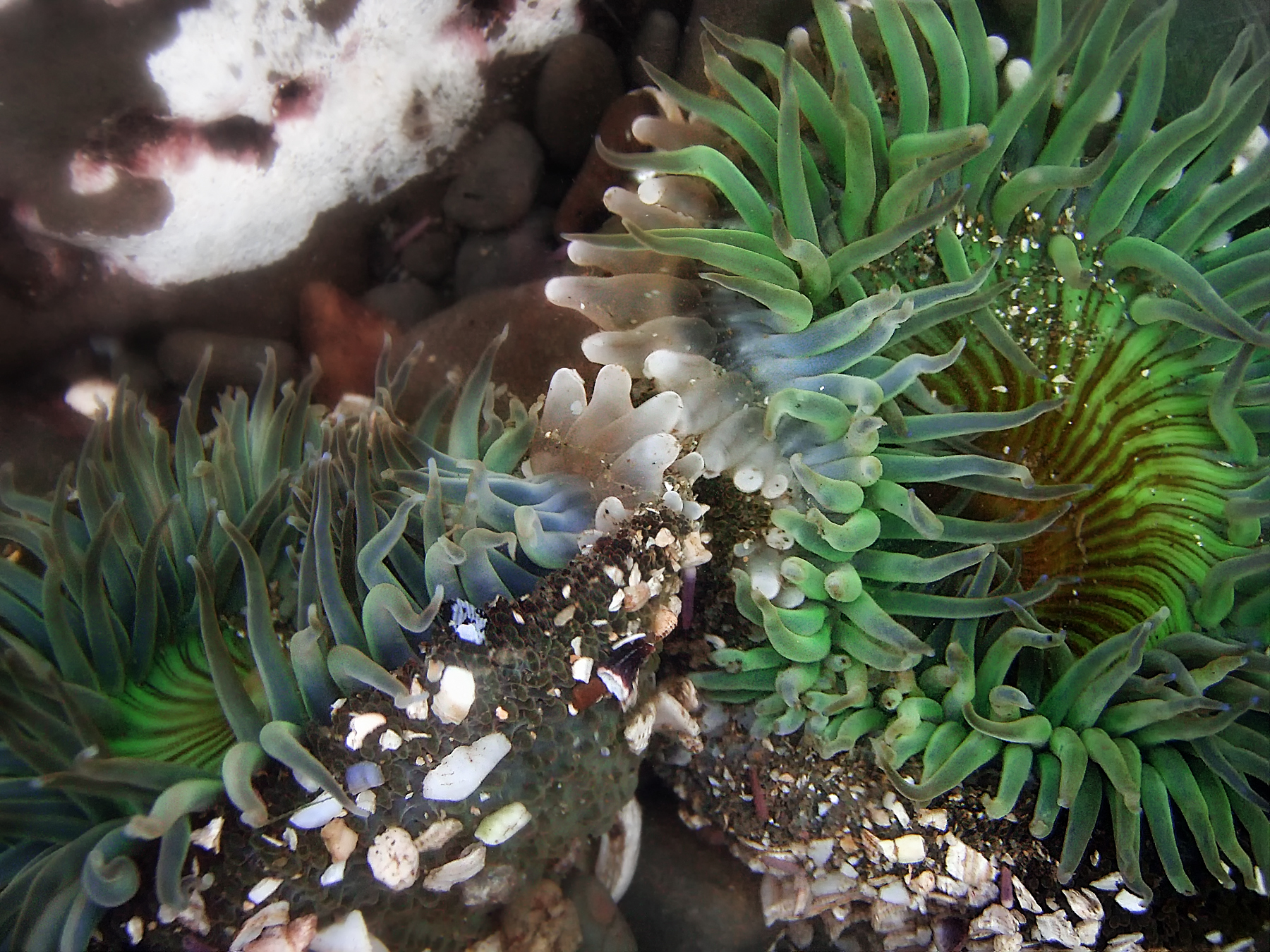
In a California tide pool, Anthopleura sola fight for territory using their white stinging acrorhagi.

The starburst anemone or sunburst anemone (Anthopleura sola) is a species of sea anemone in the family Actiniidae. The sunburst anemone was formerly considered the solitary form of the common aggregating anemone, but was identified as a separate species in 2000.

== Description ==
The sunburst anemone is a solitary anemone that averages 12 cm (4.7 in) but can grow up to 25 cm (9.8 in) wide, much larger than the aggregating anemone. The column is pale green to white in color and is twice as long as its width when extended. The column has numerous sticky protuberances (called verrucae) arranged in vertical rows to which gravel and shell fragments adhere. The oral disc is radially striped and has five rings of thick, pointed feeding tentacles. Tentacles are pale with the tips colored in pink, blue or lavender.

The starburst anemone's tentacles and oral disk display varied color patterns. Their tentacle tips are pale because the anemones frequently shelter under rocks or in shaded areas, and this lack of light prevents the development of green pigments. Additionally, the striped patterns on the tentacles are a result of genetic differentiation.

Although morphologically similar to the Aggregating Anemone (Anthopleura elegantissima), the Sunburst Anemone (Anthopleura sola) can be distinguished by its solitary nature. A. elegantissima is highly clonal and is almost always found in dense groups of its clones, whereas A. sola is non-clonal and typically solitary.

It is differentiated from Anthopleura xanthogrammica by the coloration of the tentacle tips, striped oral disk, and vertical rows of verrucae.

The color of the anemone is partly caused by symbiotic Zooxanthellae in the gastrodermal layer. This species of anemone reproduces sexually.

== Distribution and habitat ==
The sunburst anemone is found in the north west Pacific Ocean. In the United States it occurs between central California and Baja California. It lives in the lower intertidal zone in rocky habitats, often in the shelter of cracks and crevices. It also occurs in the subtidal, often in kelp forests, to depths of at least 20 m (70 ft). When the tide is out it is often concealed by shell fragments and other particles that adhere to the column, which folds into an encrusted ball. The encrusted column may serve as camouflage from predators as well as protection from solar radiation and desiccation.

Starburst anemone forms a symbiotic partnership with the dinoflagellate Breviolum muscatinei, a member of the family Symbiodiniaceae. This relationship is important to scientific interest as the geographic range of Anthopleura sola is expanding northward. As Sunburt anemone moves northward, it encounters Breviolum muscatinei, which has historically only formed partnerships with other anemone species, such as A. elegantissima and A. xanthogrammica.

Starburst anemone functions as a host in the symbiotic partnership with photosynthetic algae, primarily the dinoflagellate Breviolum muscatinei. The relationship is a nutritional exchange; the host receives photosynthetically produced sugars from the algae, while the algae receive metabolic nutrients and a protected location with access to sunlight.

However, this relationship can collapse under environmental stress, such as temperature changes, which leads to "bleaching" and the host can die. While the local population can adapt to develop resistance, this inherited adaptation only continues if the offspring live in a similar environment. Even though Sunburst anemone and Breviolum muscatinei form a partnership, each of them has its own separate life cycle with different patterns of reproduction and migration.

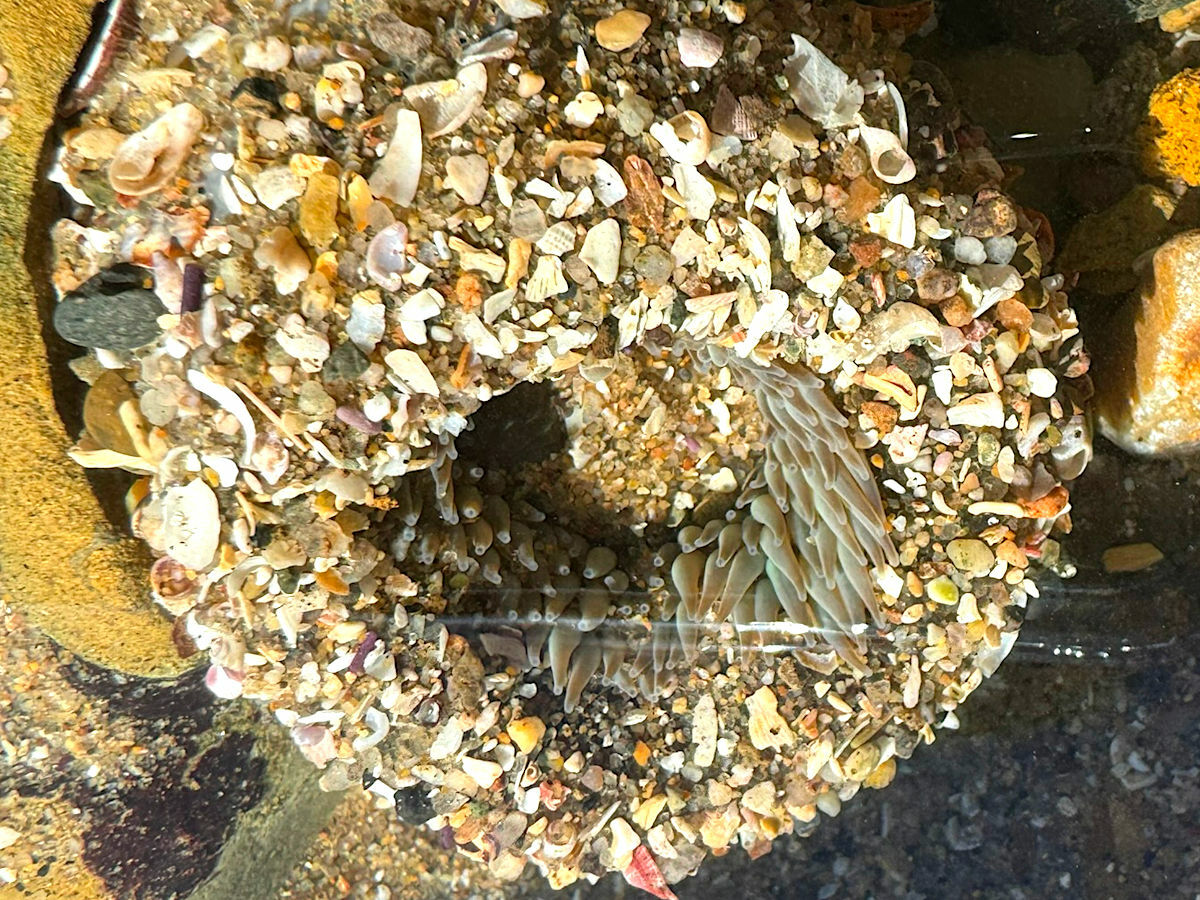
encrusted ball at low tide

== Territorial defense ==
The sunburst anemone aggressively defends its territory from other anemones which are genetically dissimilar. When it encounters a different genetic colony, the anemones extend specialized tentacles (called acrorhagi). The white tips of acrorhagi have a concentration of stinging cells (nematocytes) and are used solely to deter other colonies from encroaching on their space. The nematocysts sting the ectoderm of the invader, causing tissue necrosis and forcing the competitor to move away. The similar aggregating anemone also possesses acrorhagi.

== Diet ==
As a sessile suspension feeder, the sunburst anemone relies on prey that comes into contact with its stinging tentacles. Its diet includes mussels, sea urchins, snails, small fish, and organic flotsam. Once captured, prey is directed to the mouth at the center of its oral disc. This same opening is also used to excrete waste when food is digested. In addition, the sunburst anemone benefits from a symbiotic relationship with photosynthetic algae.
