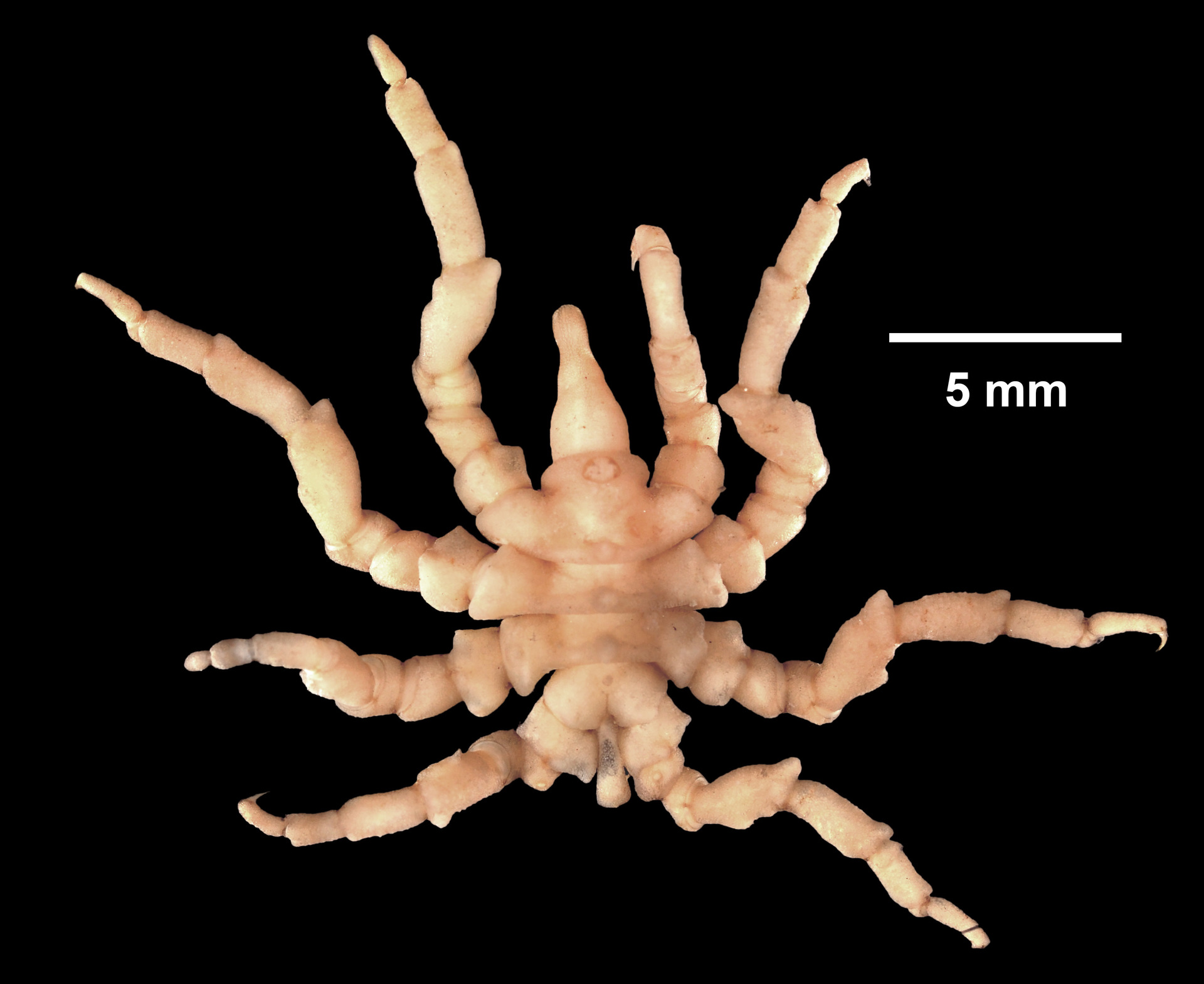
- Pycnogonum litorale

Scientific classification
- Kingdom: Animalia
- Phylum: Arthropoda
- Subphylum: Chelicerata
- Class: Pycnogonida
- Order: Pantopoda
- Family: Pycnogonidae; Wilson, 1878

Genera
- See text

= Pycnogonidae =

Family of sea spiders

Pycnogonidae is a family of sea spiders. This family includes two genera, Pycnogonum and Pentapycnon. This family is distributed worldwide.

== Characteristics ==
Sea spiders of the family Pycnogonidae are recognisable by their stubby legs, rough-surfaced exoskeleton, and the significant reduction of cephalic appendages. Chelifores (feeding pincers) and palps (sensory limbs) as seen in most other sea spiders are completely absent after postlarval metamorphosis. Sea spiders in this family instead use only the proboscis to suck juices from their cnidarian prey. Ovigers (cleaning and offspring-carrying limbs) are retained only in adult males, being absent in all females of this family and lost in both sexes only in the subgenus Nulloviger in the genus Pycnogonum.

Their legs are noticeably stout and short, in contrast to other sea spiders with a slender appearance. Like most sea spiders, most species in this family have four pairs of legs in adults, but species in the genus Pentapycnon have five pairs in adults.

== Genera ==
The World Register of Marine Species lists the following genera:

- Pentapycnon Bouvier, 1910
- Pycnogonum Bruennich, 1764
