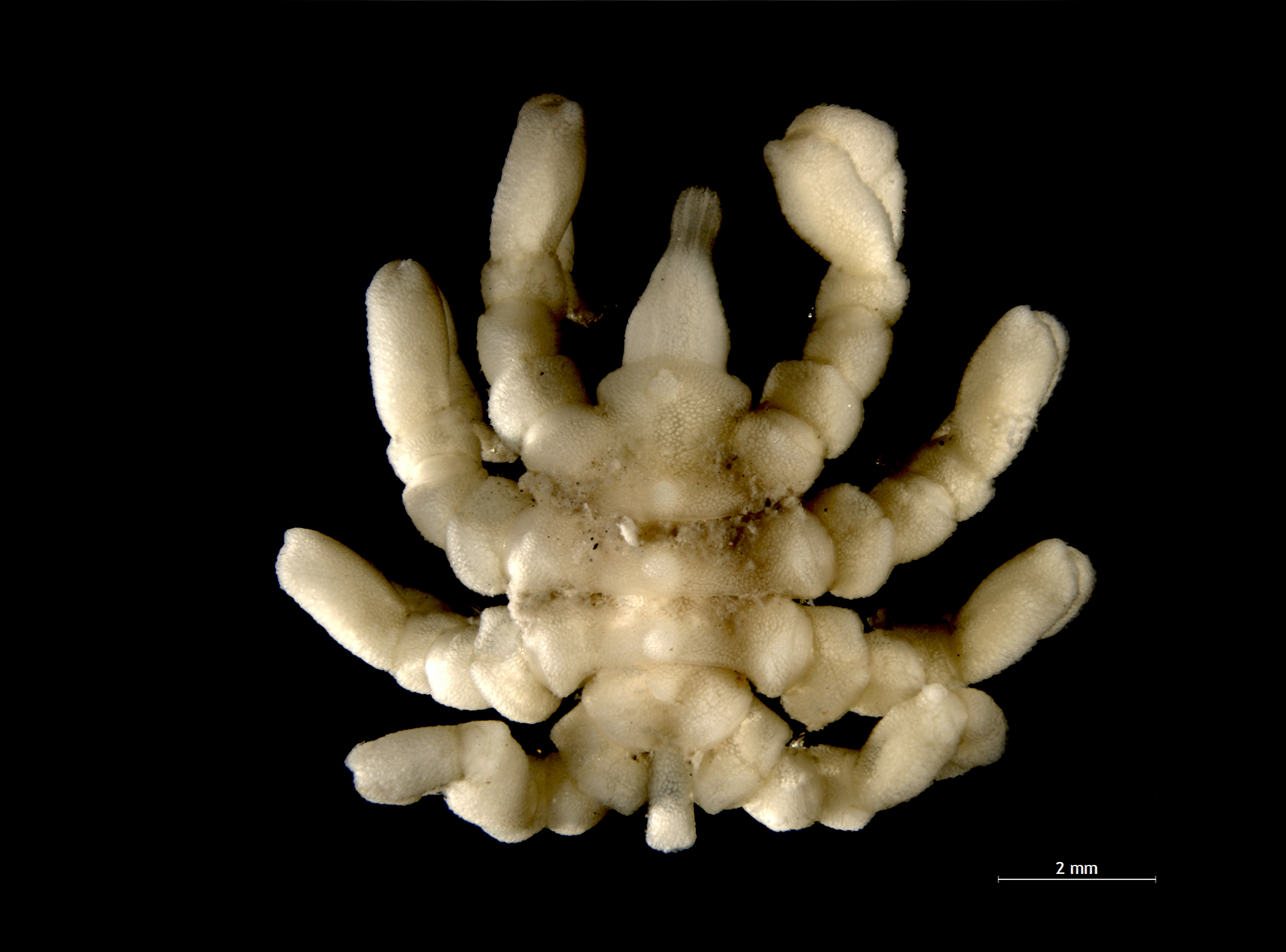
- Pycnogonum litorale

Scientific classification
- Kingdom: Animalia
- Phylum: Arthropoda
- Subphylum: Chelicerata
- Class: Pycnogonida
- Order: Pantopoda
- Family: Pycnogonidae
- Genus: Pycnogonum; Brünnich, 1764

Species
- See text

= Pycnogonum =

Genus of sea spiders

Pycnogonum is a genus of sea spiders in the family Pycnogonidae. It is the type genus of the family.

== Etymology ==
The generic name literally means “dense knees”. Pycnogonum combines the prefix pycno- (from ‘dense’ in Greek) with the Greek word for "knee": gony (γόνυ).

== Characteristics ==
Members of the genus Pycnogonum have squarish bodies with a tough integument and a few hairs. The cephalon (the anterior end of the body which is fused with the first segment of the trunk) has a long smooth proboscis and a low tubercle on which the eyes are set. There are no chelicerae or palps and these sea spiders use their proboscis to suck juices from their prey. On the first segment of the trunk of males there are small ovigerous legs with nine segments. The larvae are carried around by the males on these appendages. The four pairs of ambulatory legs are short but strong, with well-developed terminal claws. The genital openings are on the second segment of the posterior pair of legs.

== Species ==
The World Register of Marine Species lists the following species:

- Pycnogonum africanum Calman, 1938
- Pycnogonum aleuticum Turpaeva, 1994
- Pycnogonum angulirostrum Stock, 1959
- Pycnogonum anovigerum Clark, 1956
- Pycnogonum arbustum Stock, 1966
- Pycnogonum asiaticum Muller, 1992
- Pycnogonum aurilineatum Flynn, 1919
- Pycnogonum benokianum Ohshima, 1935
- Pycnogonum buticulosum Hedgpeth, 1949
- Pycnogonum calculum Bamber, 1995
- Pycnogonum callosum Losina-Losinsky, 1961
- Pycnogonum carinatum Staples, 2002
- Pycnogonum cataphractum Mobius, 1902
- Pycnogonum cessaci Bouvier, 1911
- Pycnogonum clarki Staples, 2002
- Pycnogonum coninsulum Bamber, 2008
- Pycnogonum cranaobyrsa Bamber, 2004
- Pycnogonum crassirostrum Sars, 1888
- Pycnogonum crosnieri Stock, 1991
- Pycnogonum daguilarensis Bamber, 1997
- Pycnogonum diceros Marcus, 1940
- Pycnogonum elephas Stock, 1966
- Pycnogonum eltanin Fry & Hedgpeth, 1969
- Pycnogonum forte Flynn, 1928
- Pycnogonum gaini Bouvier, 1910
- Pycnogonum gibberum Marcus & du Bois Reymond-M., 1963
- Pycnogonum gordonae Pushkin, 1984
- Pycnogonum grumus Arango, 2003
- Pycnogonum guyanae Stock, 1975
- Pycnogonum hancocki Schmitt, 1934
- Pycnogonum indicum Sundara Raj, 1930
- Pycnogonum kussakini Turpaeva, 2000
- Pycnogonum litorale (Strom, 1762)
- Pycnogonum lobipes Stock, 1991
- Pycnogonum madagascariensis Bouvier, 1911
- Pycnogonum magellanicum Hoek, 1898
- Pycnogonum magnirostrum Mobius, 1902
- Pycnogonum microps Loman
- Pycnogonum minutum Losina-Losinsky & Kopaneva, 1973
- Pycnogonum moniliferum Stock, 1991
- Pycnogonum moolenbeeki Stock, 1992
- Pycnogonum mucronatum Loman, 1908
- Pycnogonum musaicum Stock, 1994
- Pycnogonum nodulosum Dohrn, 1881
- Pycnogonum occa Loman, 1908
- Pycnogonum orientale (Dana, 1849)
- Pycnogonum ornans Stock, 1992
- Pycnogonum panamum Hilton, 1942
- Pycnogonum paragaini Munilla, 1990
- Pycnogonum planum Stock, 1954
- Pycnogonum platylophum Loman, 1923
- Pycnogonum plumipes Stock, 1960
- Pycnogonum portus Barnard, 1946
- Pycnogonum pusillum Dohrn, 1881
- Pycnogonum pustulatum Stock, 1994
- Pycnogonum repentinum Turpaeva, 2003
- Pycnogonum repentium Turpaeva, 2003
- Pycnogonum reticulatum Hedgpeth, 1948
- Pycnogonum rickettsi Schmitt, 1934
- Pycnogonum saxulum Child, 1998
- Pycnogonum sivertseni Stock, 1955
- Pycnogonum spatium Takahashi, Dick & Mawatari, 2007
- Pycnogonum stearnsi Ives, 1883
- Pycnogonum stylidium Child, 1995
- Pycnogonum tenue Slater, 1879
- Pycnogonum tesselatum Stock, 1968
- Pycnogonum torresi Clark, 1963
- Pycnogonum tuberculatum Clark, 1963
- Pycnogonum tumulosum Loman, 1908
- Pycnogonum uedai Nakamura & Child, 1983
- Pycnogonum ungellatum Loman, 1911
