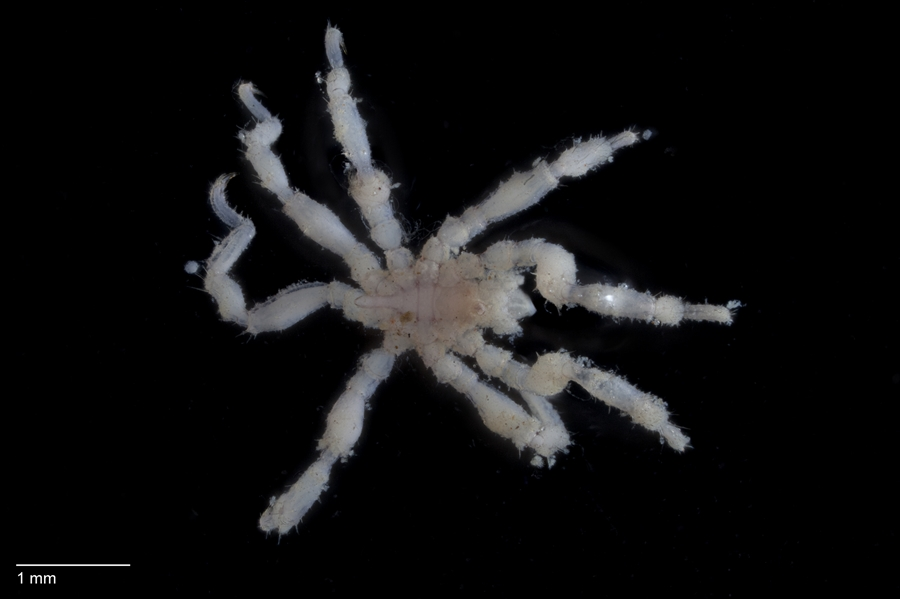

Scientific classification
- Kingdom: Animalia
- Phylum: Arthropoda
- Subphylum: Chelicerata
- Class: Pycnogonida
- Order: Pantopoda
- Family: Ammotheidae
- Genus: Achelia
- Species: A. assimilis

Binomial name
- Achelia assimilis (Haswell, 1885)

Synonyms
- Achelia variabilis Stock, 1954; Achelia wilsoni (Schimkewitsch, 1890); Ammothea wilsoni Schimkewitsch, 1887; Nymphopsis denticulata Gordon, 1932

= Achelia assimilis =

Species of sea spider

Achelia assimilis is a species of sea spider within the family Ammotheidae. They reside largely off the coasts of Australia, Chile and Argentina, but have also been documented in Asia.
