= Alaskensis =

Alaskensis may refer to:

- Achelia alaskensis, species of sea spider
- Boloria alaskensis, species of fritillary butterfly
- Calogaya alaskensis, species of lichen
- Dendrocoelopsis alaskensis, species of freshwater triclad
- Eulima alaskensis, species of sea snail
- Oleidesulfovibrio alaskensis, species of bacteria
- Propebela alaskensis, species of sea snail
- Rubus alaskensis, species of flowering plant
- Sphingopyxis alaskensis, species of bacteria
- Telmatogeton alaskensis, species of midge
- Veronica alaskensis, species of flowering plant
