= Sericosura heteroscela =

Scientific classification
- Kingdom: Animalia
- Phylum: Arthropoda
- Subphylum: Chelicerata
- Class: Pycnogonida
- Order: Pantopoda
- Family: Ammotheidae
- Genus: Sericosura
- Species: S. heteroscela

Binomial name
- Sericosura heteroscela Child & Segonzac, 1996

Synonyms
- Anisopes heteroscela (Child, C.A. & M. Segonzac, 1996)

Species of sea spider

Sericosura heteroscela is a species of sea spider within the family Ammotheidae. The species is found in the Atlantic Ocean, where it lives near hydrothermal vents at depths of 849 to 3500 meters.
