= Polygynandry =

Mating system in which both partners may have other partners

Polygynandry is a mating system in which both males and females have multiple mating partners during a breeding season. In sexually reproducing diploid animals, different mating strategies are employed by males and females, because the cost of gamete production is lower for males than it is for females. The different mating tactics employed by males and females are thought to be the outcome of stochastic reproductive conflicts both ecologically and socially.

Reproductive conflicts in animal societies may arise because individuals are not genetically identical and have different optimal strategies for maximizing their fitness; and often it is found that reproductive conflicts generally arise due to dominance hierarchy in which all or a major part of reproduction is monopolized by only one individual. In the wasp Polistes carolina, the dominant queen amongst female wasps is determined by whoever arrives at the nest first rather than the largest foundress, who is expected to be the best at fighting (wasp). In a study of the bird Prunella collaris, the close proximity and sharing of ranges on the mountain tops of the French Pyrenees led to a polygynandrous mating system, where two to four males would mate with a range of two to four females within the same vicinity.

Polygynandry is another way to describe a multi-male and multi-female polygamous mating system. When females have multiple mating partners, it is known as polyandry, and when males have multiple mating partners, it is known as polygyny. Each sex has potential benefits in being promiscuous; females, especially those with genetically 'inferior' social partners, have the chance to increase the genetic quality of their offspring, while males are able to fertilize the eggs of many other mates. Essentially, the ideal mating behavior for males is to be promiscuous rather than monogamous (when they only have one mating partner), because this leads to multiple offspring, and these males monopolize their female partners by physically preventing them from copulating with other males. On the other hand, females benefit through polyandry, as they have more sired offspring.

== Benefits of multiple mating in females ==
Oftentimes, females mate voluntarily with more than one male. Mating with several males reduces the risk of females having unfertilized eggs because one male may not have enough sperm to fertilize all her eggs. In dark-eyed juncos, a female mates with more than one male because oftentimes, her social partner is of lower genetic quality than other potential sperm donors. The females voluntarily mate with other males besides their mate because she sees the potential to improve her offspring viability and sexual attractiveness. Females may also mate with several males for genetic benefits such as genetic diversity among her offspring due to the variety of sperm available to her. In song birds, extra-pair matings occur because females are able to sneak away from their home territories to solicit to other males. When female song birds seek extra-male partners, they sexually select males with colorful plumage more elaborate than those of their social partner. Studies show that female song birds that have less plumage partners most actively seek extra-pair matings, furthermore males with the most developed traits—such as longer tails or brighter plumage survive better. Thus, when female song birds have multiple mating partners, they are increasing the genetic quality of their offspring.

To a female, multiple mating means an increase number of young that a female can produce, and oftentimes this also means an increase number of young they have to take care of. In order to ensure the safety and wellbeing of her offspring, females may have multiple mating partners in order to gain more resources from males for herself and her offspring. In dark-eyed juncos, dunnocks, and Galapagos hawks, mating with multiple males increases the amount of care a female can gain for her offspring. Oftentimes multiple mates allow females to have more sired offspring and the paternity of the offspring typically falls outside of the biological parents—meaning a different male may look after another male's offspring.

== Benefits of multiple mating in males ==
Males can potentially fertilize eggs at a much faster rate than females can produce them, meaning a male can best increase his reproductive success by finding and fertilizing as many different females as possible. In Drosophila melanogaster, the reproductive success of males increased with the number of matings, but for females there was no direct relationship with number of mates and number of offspring produced. When males have multiple mating partners, they sometimes have to share parentage of the offspring, reducing the genetic value of the offspring to him and thus reduces the relative benefit of staying to help. When paternity is shared between multiple males, males are expected to be less likely to stay in order to help the female care for the offspring because there is little benefit in staying to help raise the other offspring when there are other males present.

Although males are able to increase their reproductive success faster than females by being able to fertilize eggs faster than females can produce them, males are also at a disadvantage when it comes to mating because of sexual selection. Females usually choose males that are 'charming' and those who display sexual ornaments. In a study of long-tailed widowbirds, males with longer tails were sexually selected over those with shorter and less impressive tails. In birds such as the red-collared widowbird, males who display their sexual ornament during courtship are generally paired up faster and attract more females than males who display shorter tails during courtship. Males are often sexually selected based on their physical characteristics and what they have to 'offer', for example, male peacocks with flamboyant colored tails are sexually selected over those with dull and less elaborate tails. Sexual selection of males by females also leads to male-male competition. Unlike females who invest a lot prior to mating, males do not invest as much when generating their sperm, however this increases competition amongst males for female investment. High mating competition also means a greater variance in male success—the best competitors will have better success in mating than those who fail to mate. The best competitors will less likely be inclined to care for their offspring upon mating because they have the ability to produce offspring elsewhere. Males with the greatest size, strength, or best developed weapons achieve the greatest mating success. In other cases, males may have a higher reproductive success if they have better access to resources than other competitors. For instance, female hanging flies mate with a male only if he provides a large insect for her to eat during copulation and North American bullfrogs protect ponds and small lakes where females come to lay their eggs.

== Taxonomic references ==
=== Amphibia ===
The various mating tactics are found in a broad number of taxa. In amphibians such as Salamandrina perspicillata, multiple paternity is a consequence of females mating with multiple males. As of now, all species in the suborder Salamandroidea have shown to employ polyandrous mating strategies by females. In a study of a population of Salamandrina perspicillata, multiple paternity occurs as a pervasive reproductive strategy under natural conditions and it is seen that in these species, when males mated with two females, they sired offspring who were inversely related with their genetic similarity to the female. Females in this species practiced polygynandry in order to increase genetic variability among her offspring by choosing mates that were genetically different from themselves. Unlike other studies of polygynandry where the females had multiple mating partners in order to gain resources from the male, in the study of Salamandrina perspicillata, multiple paternity did not provide a genetic indirect benefit to the offspring. This, resulted in a cost/benefit mechanism in which the gained benefit of multiple mating counterbalanced the negative effect of the number of mates on offspring heterozygosity. Females choosing mates that are genetically different from themselves were also seen in Ichthyosaura alpestris and Lissotriton vulgaris, where in a two-male mating system, the less-related males were preferred by the females. And like the case of Salamandrina perspicillata, there were no indirect genetic benefits gained from having multiple mating partners.

=== Pycnogonids (sea spider) ===
In Ammothea hilgendorfi, a sea spider species, fertilization occurs as a female transfers her eggs to a male who holds them with ovigers, a specialized pair of legs and fertilizes the eggs externally. The males glue the eggs into clusters and carries the eggs on his ovigers until they hatch. The personal cost to males for providing a prolonged care for the young is seen to be a significant parental investment because parental assurance is thought to be substantial for post-zygotic investment. A high level of paternity assurance is Ammothea hilgendorfi, suggests that reduced foraging ability, increased predation risk, and lower mobility exist. An experimental study of Ammothea hilgendorfi showed that although males mate with multiple females, males do not mix egg batches from different dams. The eggs held in clusters by a male hatched in a close time frame, indicating that males mated with different females within a short time span.

Multiple mating by female pycnogonids are possible since a recently mated female often retains unused mature eggs in one or more femora, which allows her to mate with additional partners. In species with external fertilization and male parental care, females are able to distribute her clutch amongst different males and by doing so the female increases the likelihood that at least some of her offspring will receive indirect genetic benefits and/or extensive parental care from a quality provider.

=== Hymenoptera ===
The reproductive females of social Hymenoptera—wasps, bees, and ants—mate with multiple partners. These females are called queens, to distinguish them from the non-reprodutive females that tend the colony and do not mate.

A honey bee queen ideally mates with about a dozen drones (males) in her nuptial flight. The sperm of matings are stored in a special reservoir, called the spermatheca, for the life of the queen—which can be several years.

== Maintenance ==
Although promiscuity is said to benefit both males and females, there has not yet been sufficient data to support the fact that promiscuity benefits females. In a study of dark-eyed juncos, the offspring produced by extra-pair males were neither better nor worse than the offspring of their male social partners. However, the study of dark-eyed juncos did reveal more sired offspring in promiscuous females than monogamous females. In a study of female water striders, the results showed that multiple matings can become costly to the female—especially since a lot of time and energy is invested in producing an egg. Not only were extra matings costly, but there was no support for any genetic benefits from having multiple mating partners. Instead, the results from the experiment showed that egg production and egg hatching success were the highest when the number of partners were kept at a minimum.

On the other hand, studies have shown that males have had a higher reproductive success than females when they were polygynandrous. When compared to female chimpanzees, male chimpanzees had a better ratio of number of matings and number of offspring produced. Not only did studies show a higher reproductive success, but Columbian ground squirrels exhibited a significant male-biased sexual size and body mass, suggesting male-male competition. Male-male competition means sexual dimorphism amongst the males and this means females are able to sexually select males based on the sexual ornaments they display.

Overall, studies have shown that polygynandry benefits males more than it benefits females. When polygynandry is observed in different species, males most often have the upper hand—meaning males benefit more from polygynandry than do females. Females generally seek multiple mating partners in order to increase benefits for their offspring, whether it be by gaining physical resources for their offspring or by providing their offspring with healthier genes that are fit for survival. On the other hand, in most cases males generally have multiple mating partners in order to obtain as much offspring as they can during their lifespan and they are able to achieve this easier than females because in most cases, males are not parentally involved in caring and raising their offspring.
