= Tanystylum tiara =

Scientific classification
- Kingdom: Animalia
- Phylum: Arthropoda
- Subphylum: Chelicerata
- Class: Pycnogonida
- Order: Pantopoda
- Family: Ammotheidae
- Genus: Tanystylum
- Species: T. tiara

Binomial name
- Tanystylum tiara Staples, 2019

Species of sea spider

Tanystylum tiara is a species of sea spider in the subfamily Achelinae. It was formally described in 2019, and is known from the Indian Ocean.

== Taxonomy and etymology ==
The species was described by David Staples in 2019. The single specimen he described it from was collected from the southwest Indian Ocean at a depth of 745 meters in 2011. He gave it the specific name tiara due to the outgrowths on the front of the head, which resemble a tiara.

== Description ==
The front of the head has a pronounced outgrowth with three peaks. The peaks on the sides are smaller than the central peak, and all of them are tipped with spines. The proboscis is shaped like a cylinder and black on the far end. The chelifores are clawless, with the scapes pointed upwards and becoming thinner as they approach the tip. At the tip are three spines, the larger of the three roughly half the length of the scape. The palps have seven segments, the last three of which have long setae on the bottom. The ovigers (egg bearing legs) have nine segments with two spines on the last one.

The trunk is 1.52 milimeters long and unsegmented. The lateral processes which house the walking legs touch each other and have bumps on both sides of the far end. The ocular tubercle is tall and has a conical upper third. On this tubercle are four large and pigmented eyes.
