= Sericosura mitrata =

Scientific classification
- Kingdom: Animalia
- Phylum: Arthropoda
- Subphylum: Chelicerata
- Class: Pycnogonida
- Order: Pantopoda
- Family: Ammotheidae
- Genus: Sericosura
- Species: S. mitrata

Binomial name
- Sericosura mitrata (Gordon, 1944)

Synonyms
- Achelia mitrata Gordon, 1944

Species of sea spider

Sericosura mitrata is a species of sea spider within the family Ammotheidae. The species is found near the Antarctic in the Southern Ocean, with the holotype of the species being found off Kemp Land at a depth of 219 meters. Other areas the species has been found includes the Atlantic near Namibia, and in the North Pacific at depths of 106 to 3500 meters.
