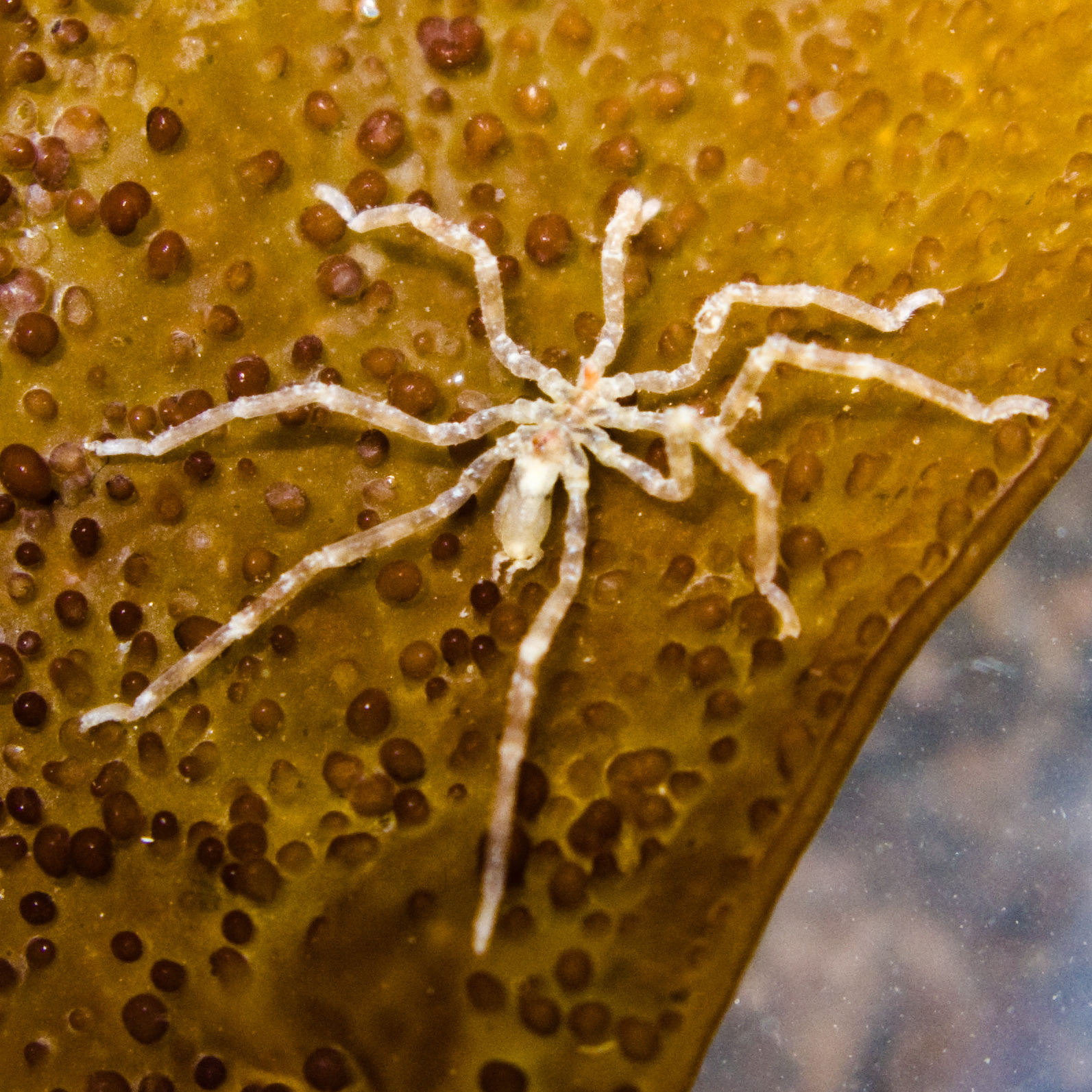

Scientific classification
- Kingdom: Animalia
- Phylum: Arthropoda
- Subphylum: Chelicerata
- Class: Pycnogonida
- Order: Pantopoda
- Family: Ammotheidae
- Genus: Ammothea
- Species: A. hilgendorfi

Binomial name
- Ammothea hilgendorfi (Böhm, 1879)

= Ammothea hilgendorfi =

Species of sea spider

Ammothea hilgendorfi is a species of sea spider of the family Ammotheidae described by Böhm in 1879. According to the Global Invasive Species Database, A. hilgendorfi is native to the intertidal zone waters of the North Pacific Ocean, but is considered an invasive species in European waters.
