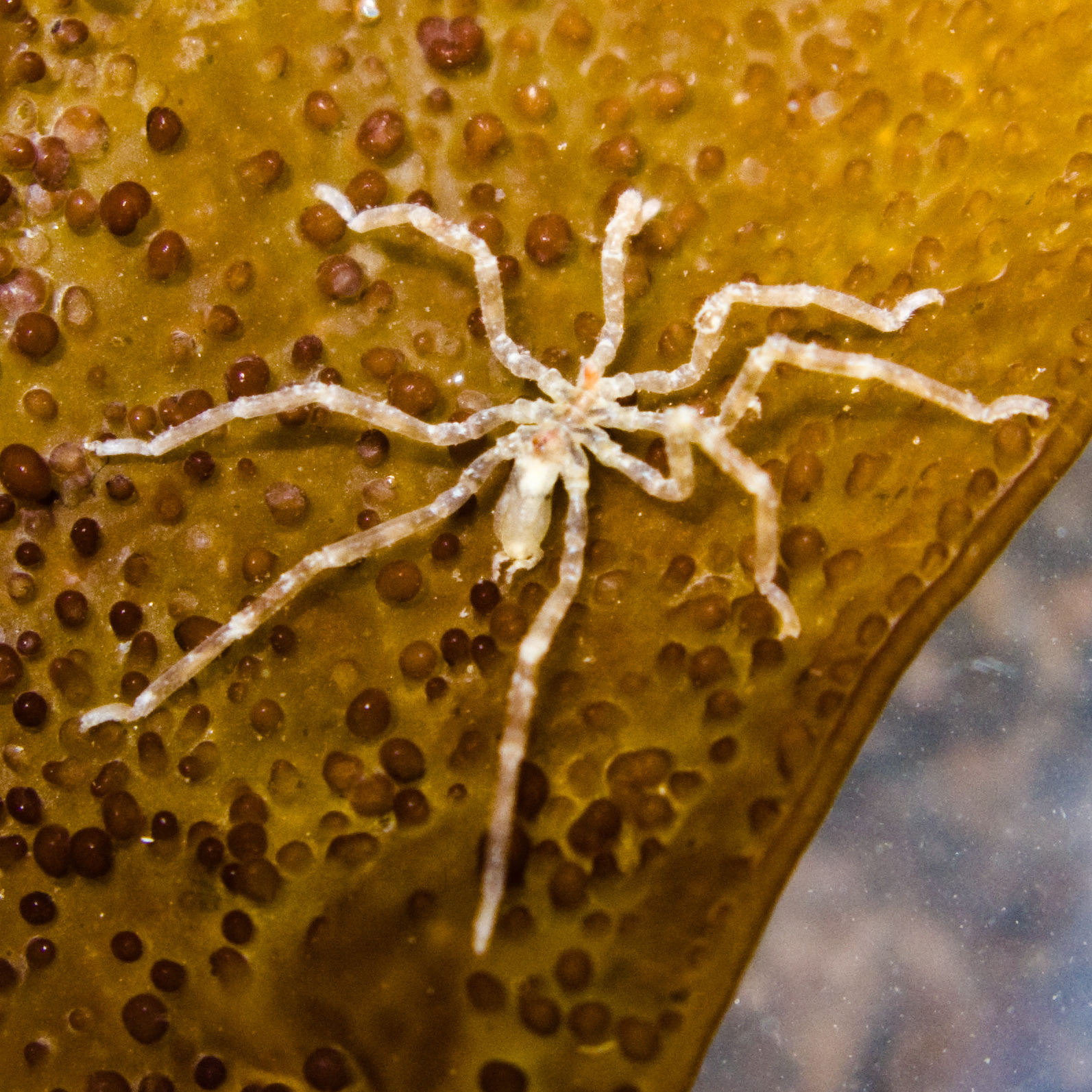
- Ammothea hilgendorfi

Scientific classification
- Kingdom: Animalia
- Phylum: Arthropoda
- Subphylum: Chelicerata
- Class: Pycnogonida
- Order: Pantopoda
- Family: Ammotheidae
- Subfamily: Ammotheinae
- Genus: Ammothea; Leach, 1814

= Ammothea =

Genus of sea spiders

Ammothea is a genus of sea spiders. About 39 species of the genus have been described, including:

- Ammothea acheliata Child, 1998
- Ammothea adunca Child, 1994
- Ammothea allopodes Fry & Hedgpeth, 1969
- Ammothea antipodensis Clark, 1972
- Ammothea armentis Child, 1994
- Ammothea australiensis (Flynn, 1919)
- Ammothea bentartica Munilla, 2001
- Ammothea bicorniculata Stiboy-Risch, 1992
- Ammothea bigibbosa Munilla & Ramos, 2005
- Ammothea calmani Gordon, 1932
- Ammothea carolinensis Leach, 1814
- Ammothea childi Cano & López-González, 2013
- Ammothea clausi Pfeffer, 1889
- Ammothea depolaris Stock, 1966
- Ammothea dorsiplicata (Hilton, 1943)
- Ammothea gigantea Gordon, 1932
- Ammothea glacialis (Hodgson, 1907)
- Ammothea gordonae Child, 1994
- Ammothea hedgpethi (Utinomi, 1959)
- Ammothea hesperidensis Munilla, 2000
- Ammothea hilgendorfi (Böhm, 1879)
- Ammothea insularis Child, 1992
- Ammothea longispina Gordon, 1932
- Ammothea magniceps Thompson, 1884
- Ammothea makara Clark, 1977
- Ammothea meridionalis Hodgson, 1914
- Ammothea minor (Hodgson, 1907)
- Ammothea ovatoides Stock, 1973
- Ammothea profunda Losina-Losinsky, 1961
- Ammothea pseudospinosa Cano & López-González, 2013
- Ammothea sextarticulata Munilla, 1991
- Ammothea spicula Nakamura & Child, 1983
- Ammothea spinosa (Hodgson, 1907)
- Ammothea striata (Möbius, 1902)
- Ammothea stylirostris Gordon, 1932
- Ammothea tetrapora Gordon, 1932
- Ammothea tibialis Munilla, 2002
- Ammothea uru Clark, 1977
- Ammothea victoriae Cano & López-González, 2007
