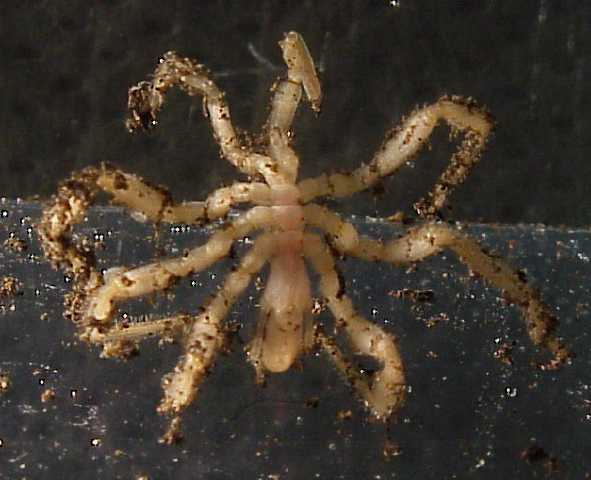

Scientific classification
- Kingdom: Animalia
- Phylum: Arthropoda
- Subphylum: Chelicerata
- Class: Pycnogonida
- Order: Pantopoda
- Family: Ammotheidae
- Genus: Sericosura
- Species: S. verenae

Binomial name
- Sericosura verenae (Child, 1987)

Synonyms
- Sericosura verenae (Child, 1987)

= Sericosura verenae =

Species of sea spider

Sericosura verenae is a species of sea spider within the family Ammotheidae. The species is located off the coast of New Zealand. The species has also been observed on the Axial Seamount.
