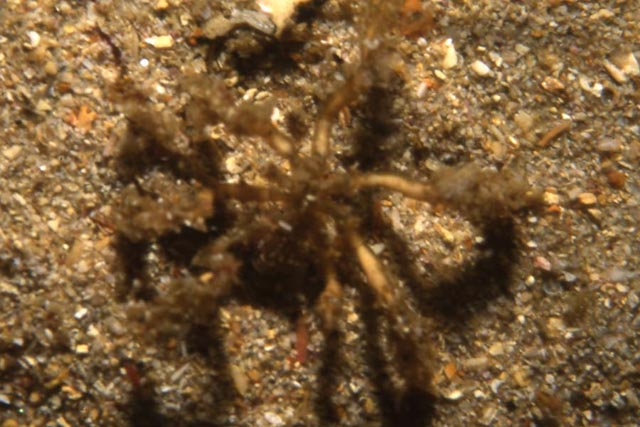
- Tanystylum brevipes

Scientific classification
- Kingdom: Animalia
- Phylum: Arthropoda
- Subphylum: Chelicerata
- Class: Pycnogonida
- Order: Pantopoda
- Family: Ammotheidae
- Subfamily: Achelinae
- Genus: Tanystylum; Miers, 1879

= Tanystylum =

Genus of sea spiders

Tanystylum is a genus of sea spiders in the family Ammotheidae. It contains 54 species.

== Species ==
The following species are classified in this genus:

- Tanystylum acuminatum Stock, 1954
- Tanystylum antipodum Clark, 1977
- Tanystylum beuroisi Arnaud, 1974
- Tanystylum bigibbosum Fage & Stock, 1966
- Tanystylum birkelandi Child, 1979
- Tanystylum boucheti Sabroux, in Sabroux, Hassanin & Corbari, 2022
- Tanystylum bredini Child, 1970
- Tanystylum brevicaudatum Fage & Stock, 1966
- Tanystylum brevipes (Hoek, 1881)
- Tanystylum calicirostrum Schimkewitsch, 1890
- Tanystylum californicum Hilton, 1939
- Tanystylum caulieri Flandroit & Geerinckx in Flandroit, Geerinckx, Decoux, Perales Garcia, Chang & Eeckhaut, 2026
- Tanystylum cavidorsum Stock, 1957
- Tanystylum chierchiai Schimkewitsch, 1887
- Tanystylum cinctum Child, 1992
- Tanystylum conirostre (Dohrn, 1881)
- Tanystylum distinctum Child & Hedgpeth, 1971
- Tanystylum dohrnii Schimkewitsch, 1890
- Tanystylum dowi Child, 1979
- Tanystylum duospinum Hilton, 1939
- Tanystylum evelinae Marcus, 1940
- Tanystylum excuratum Stock, 1954
- Tanystylum geminum Stock, 1954
- Tanystylum grossifemorum (Hilton, 1942)
- Tanystylum haswelli Child, 1990
- Tanystylum hoekianum Schimkewitsch, 1889
- Tanystylum hooperi Clark, 1977
- Tanystylum hummelincki Stock, 1954
- Tanystylum ingrallis Sabroux, in Sabroux, Hassanin & Corbari, 2022
- Tanystylum intermedium Cole, 1904
- Tanystylum isabellae Marcus, 1940
- Tanystylum isthmiacum Stock, 1955
- Tanystylum kiixin Toler-Scott, Park, Gordon & Leander, 2026
- Tanystylum lamonti Staples, 2019
- Tanystylum malpelensis Child, 1979
- Tanystylum neorhetum Marcus, 1940
- Tanystylum nesiotes Child, 1970
- Tanystylum occidentalis (Cole, 1904)
- Tanystylum oedinotum Loman, 1923
- Tanystylum orbiculare Wilson, 1878
- Tanystylum ornatum Flynn, 1928
- Tanystylum papuensis Child, 1996
- Tanystylum parahybanum Lucena, de Araújo & Christoffersen, 2019
- Tanystylum paramexicanum Müller H.-G. & Krapp, 2009
- Tanystylum philippinensis Child, 1988
- Tanystylum rehderi Child, 1970
- Tanystylum scrutator Stock, 1954
- Tanystylum sinoabductus Bamber, 1992
- Tanystylum styligerum (Miers, 1875)
- Tanystylum tayronae Müller H.-G. & Krapp, 2009
- Tanystylum thermophilum (Barnard, 1946)
- Tanystylum tiara Staples, 2019
- Tanystylum ulreungum Kim, 1983
- Tanystylum zuytdorpi Arango, 2009
