= Achelia alaskensis =

Scientific classification
- Kingdom: Animalia
- Phylum: Arthropoda
- Subphylum: Chelicerata
- Class: Pycnogonida
- Order: Pantopoda
- Family: Ammotheidae
- Genus: Achelia
- Species: A. alaskensis

Binomial name
- Achelia alaskensis (Cole, 1904)

Synonyms
- Achelia gurjanovii Losina-Losinsky, 1961; Achelia kamtschatica Losina-Losinsky, 1961; Achelia nudiuscula (Hall, 1913); Ammothea nidiuscula Hall, 1913

Species of sea spider

Achelia alaskensis is a species of sea spider within the family Ammotheidae. The species is found distributed off the western side of North America in the Pacific and Arctic Ocean, areas such as Canada, Alaska, Oregon, Washington, and California, as well as in the Bering Sea. It lives in benthic environments at depths up to 180 meters. It grows to a length of 1 centimeter. Larvae of the species are parasites and are found in Polyorchis karafutoensis.
