= Hemichela =

Scientific classification
- Kingdom: Animalia
- Phylum: Arthropoda
- Subphylum: Chelicerata
- Class: Pycnogonida
- Order: Pantopoda
- Family: Ammotheidae
- Genus: Hemichela; Stock, 1954

Genus of sea spiders

Hemichela is a genus of sea spiders within the family Ammotheidae, with 3 currently assigned species.

== Species ==
- Hemichela longiunguis Staples, 1982
- Hemichela micrasterias Stock 1954
- Hemichela nanhaiensis Wang et al. 2015
