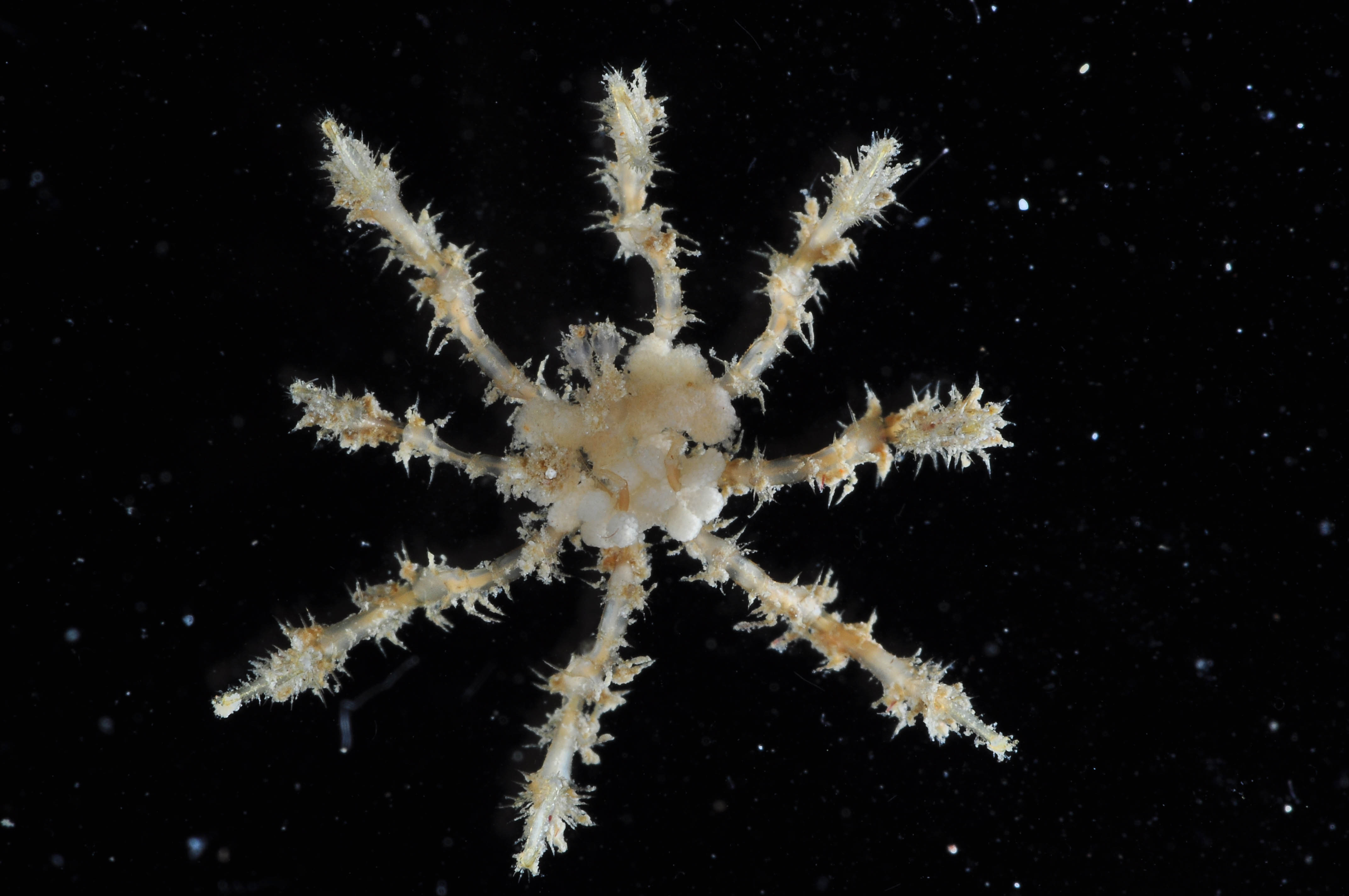
- Nymphopsis muscosa

Scientific classification
- Kingdom: Animalia
- Phylum: Arthropoda
- Subphylum: Chelicerata
- Class: Pycnogonida
- Order: Pantopoda
- Family: Ammotheidae
- Genus: Nymphopsis; Haswell, 1884

= Nymphopsis =

Genus of sea spiders

Nymphopsis is a genus of sea spiders belonging to the family Ammotheidae.

The genus has almost cosmopolitan distribution, except Europe.

Species:

- Nymphopsis abstrusus Loman, 1922
- Nymphopsis acinacispinatus Williams, 1933
- Nymphopsis anarthra Loman, 1928
- Nymphopsis armatus Haswell, 1884
- Nymphopsis bathursti Williams, 1940
