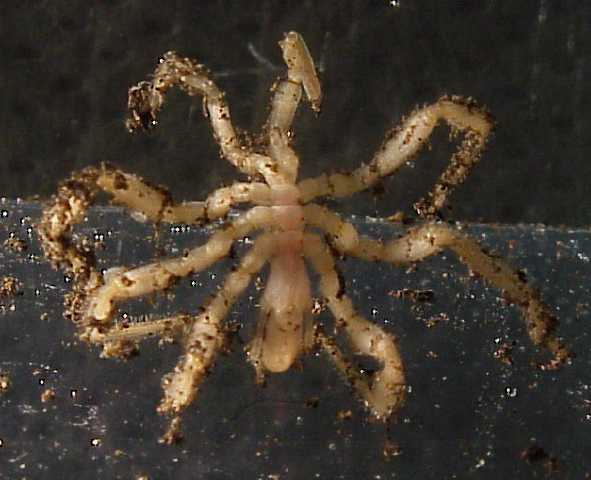
- Sericosura verenae

Scientific classification
- Kingdom: Animalia
- Phylum: Arthropoda
- Subphylum: Chelicerata
- Class: Pycnogonida
- Order: Pantopoda
- Family: Ammotheidae
- Genus: Sericosura; Fry & Hedgpeth, 1969

= Sericosura =

Genus of sea spiders

Sericosura is a genus of sea spiders in the family Ammotheidae. Species within this genus have been found in the eastern Pacific Ocean from California to Alaska living at depths from 106 to 3,690 meters below sea level often near methane seeps.

This genus of sea spiders is host to a diverse community of methane and methanol oxidizing bacteria on its exoskeleton in dense aggregations. Such bacteria found on their exoskeletons include members of the bacterial families Methylomonadaceae and Methylophagaceae. It is thought that theses sea spiders farm and feed on theses bacteria. This provides a unique interaction between an animal and chemically fueled bacteria.

== Species ==
- Sericosura bamberi Arango & Linse, 2015
- Sericosura cochleifovea Child, 1989
- Sericosura conta Bamber, 2009
- Sericosura curva Arango & Linse, 2015
- Sericosura cyrtoma Child & Segonzac, 1996
- Sericosura dentatus Wang, Lin, Bamber & Huang, 2013
- Sericosura dimorpha Arango & Linse, 2015
- Sericosura dissita Child, 2000
- Sericosura gemmaemonsis Wang, Lin, Bamber & Huang, 2013
- Sericosura hedgpethi Bamber, 2009
- Sericosura heteroscela Child & Segonzac, 1996
- Sericosura mitrata (Gordon, 1944)
- Sericosura venticola Child, 1987
- Sericosura verenae (Child, 1987)
