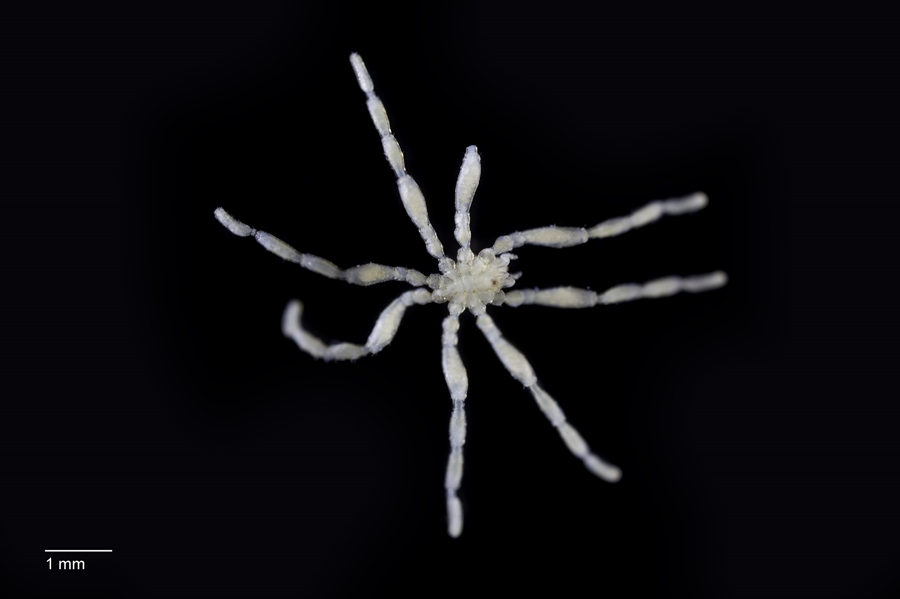
- Achelia transfugoides

Scientific classification
- Kingdom: Animalia
- Phylum: Arthropoda
- Subphylum: Chelicerata
- Class: Pycnogonida
- Order: Pantopoda
- Family: Ammotheidae
- Genus: Achelia; Hodge, 1864

= Achelia =

Genus of sea spiders

Achelia is a genus of pycnogonids in the family Ammotheidae.

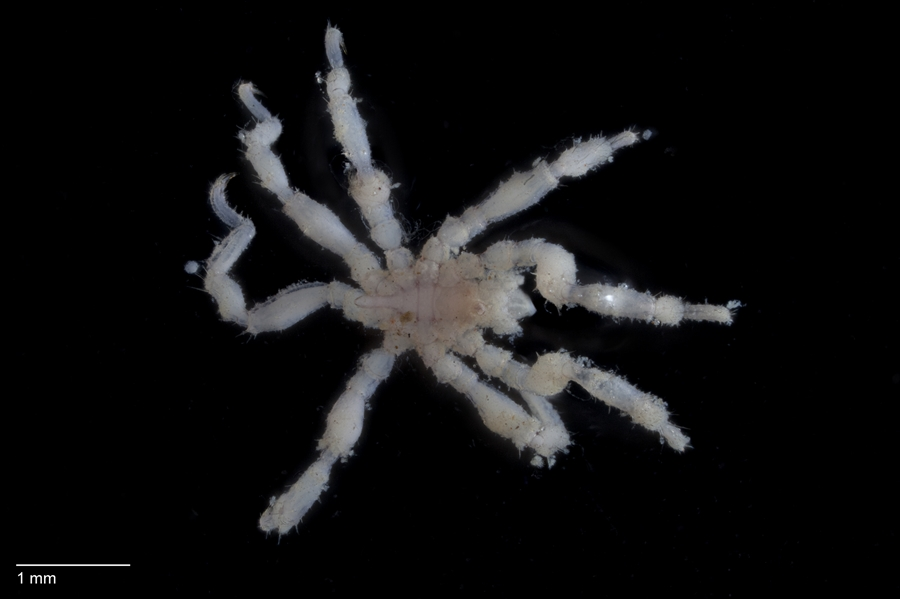
Achelia assimilis

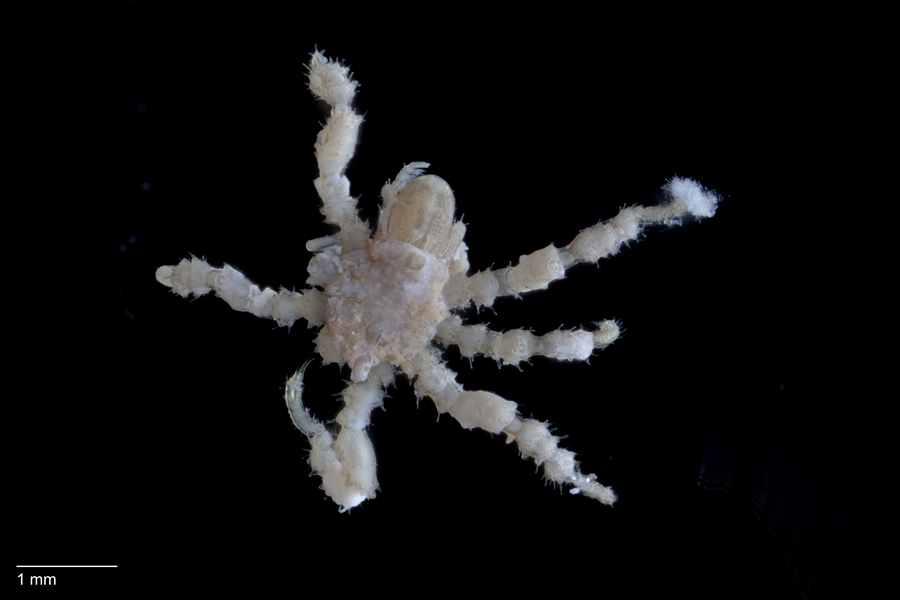
Achelia shepherdi

== Species ==
The following are the species comprising the genus Achelia.

- Achelia adelpha Child, 1970
- Achelia alaskensis (Cole, 1904)
- Achelia anomala Arnaud, 1974
- Achelia armata Bouvier, 1916
- Achelia aspera Loman, 1923
- Achelia assimilis (Haswell, 1885)
- Achelia australiensis Stock, 1954
- Achelia barnardi Stock, 1959
- Achelia besnardi Sawaya, 1951
- Achelia bituberculata Hedgpeth, 1949
- Achelia borealis (Schimkewitsch, 1895)
- Achelia boschi Stock, 1992
- Achelia brevicauda (Loman, 1904)
- Achelia brevirostris Losina-Losinsky, 1961
- Achelia bullosa Child, 1996
- Achelia chelata (Hilton, 1939)
- Achelia columnaris Stock, 1992
- Achelia communis (Bouvier, 1906)
- Achelia crurispinifera Kim & Kim, 1985
- Achelia cuneatis Child, 1999
- Achelia curticauda Nakamura, Miyazaki & Child, 1996
- Achelia deodata Muller, 1990
- Achelia discoidea Exline, 1936
- Achelia dohrni (Thompson, 1884)
- Achelia echinata Hodge, 1864
- Achelia euryfrontalis Turpaeva, 2000
- Achelia fernandeziana (Loman, 1920)
- Achelia germanica (Hodgson, 1915)
- Achelia gracilipes (Cole, 1904)
- Achelia gracilis Verrill, 1900
- Achelia hariettae Marcus, 1940
- Achelia hispida Hodge, 1864
- Achelia hoekii (Pfeffer, 1889)
- Achelia japonica Ortmann, 1890
- Achelia kiiensis Utinomi, 1951
- Achelia kurilensis Losina-Losinsky, 1961
- Achelia laevis Hodge, 1864
- Achelia lagena Child, 1994
- Achelia lagenaria Stock, 1992
- Achelia langi (Dohrn, 1881)
- Achelia latifrons (Cole, 1904)
- Achelia megacephala Hodgson, 1915
- Achelia megova (Hilton, 1943)
- Achelia mixta Stock, 1994
- Achelia nana (Loman, 1908)
- Achelia neotenica Krapp, 1986
- Achelia orientalis Schimkewitsch, 1913
- Achelia orpax Nakamura & Child, 1983
- Achelia ovosetosa (Hilton, 1942)
- Achelia parvula (Loman, 1923)
- Achelia pribilofensis (Cole, 1904)
- Achelia quadridentata (Hodgson, 1910)
- Achelia rostrata Turpaeva, 2000
- Achelia salebrosa Losina-Losinsky, 1961
- Achelia sawayai Marcus, 1940
- Achelia scabra Wilson, 1880
- Achelia segmentata Utinomi, 1954
- Achelia serratipalpis (Bouvier, 1911)
- Achelia setulosa (Loman, 1912)
- Achelia shepherdi Stock, 1973
- Achelia simplex (Giltay, 1934)
- Achelia simplissima (Hilton, 1939)
- Achelia socors (Loman, 1908)
- Achelia spatula Nakamura & Child, 1983
- Achelia spicata (Hodgson, 1915)
- Achelia spinosa (Stimpson, 1853)
- Achelia spinoseta (Hilton, 1939)
- Achelia sufflata Gordon, 1944
- Achelia superba (Loman, 1911)
- Achelia tenuipes Stock, 1990
- Achelia transfuga Stock, 1954
- Achelia transfugoides Stock, 1973
- Achelia turba Stock, 1990
- Achelia vulgaris (Costa, 1861)
- Achelia watamu (Müller, 1990)
