= Rubus alaskensis =

Scientific classification
- Kingdom: Plantae
- Clade: Tracheophytes
- Clade: Angiosperms
- Clade: Eudicots
- Clade: Rosids
- Order: Rosales
- Family: Rosaceae
- Genus: Rubus
- Species: R. alaskensis

Binomial name
- Rubus alaskensis L.H.Bailey 1941

Synonyms
- Rubus pubescens var. alaskensis (L.H.Bailey) B.Boivin

Berry and plant

Rubus alaskensis, the Alaska blackberry, is a North American species of flowering plant in the rose family.

The genetics of Rubus is extremely complex, so it is difficult to decide on which groups should be recognized as species. There are many rare species with limited ranges such as this. Further study is suggested to clarify the taxonomy.

It is native to Alaska and to western Canada (Yukon, Northwest Territory, British Columbia).
