= Coastline of Australia =

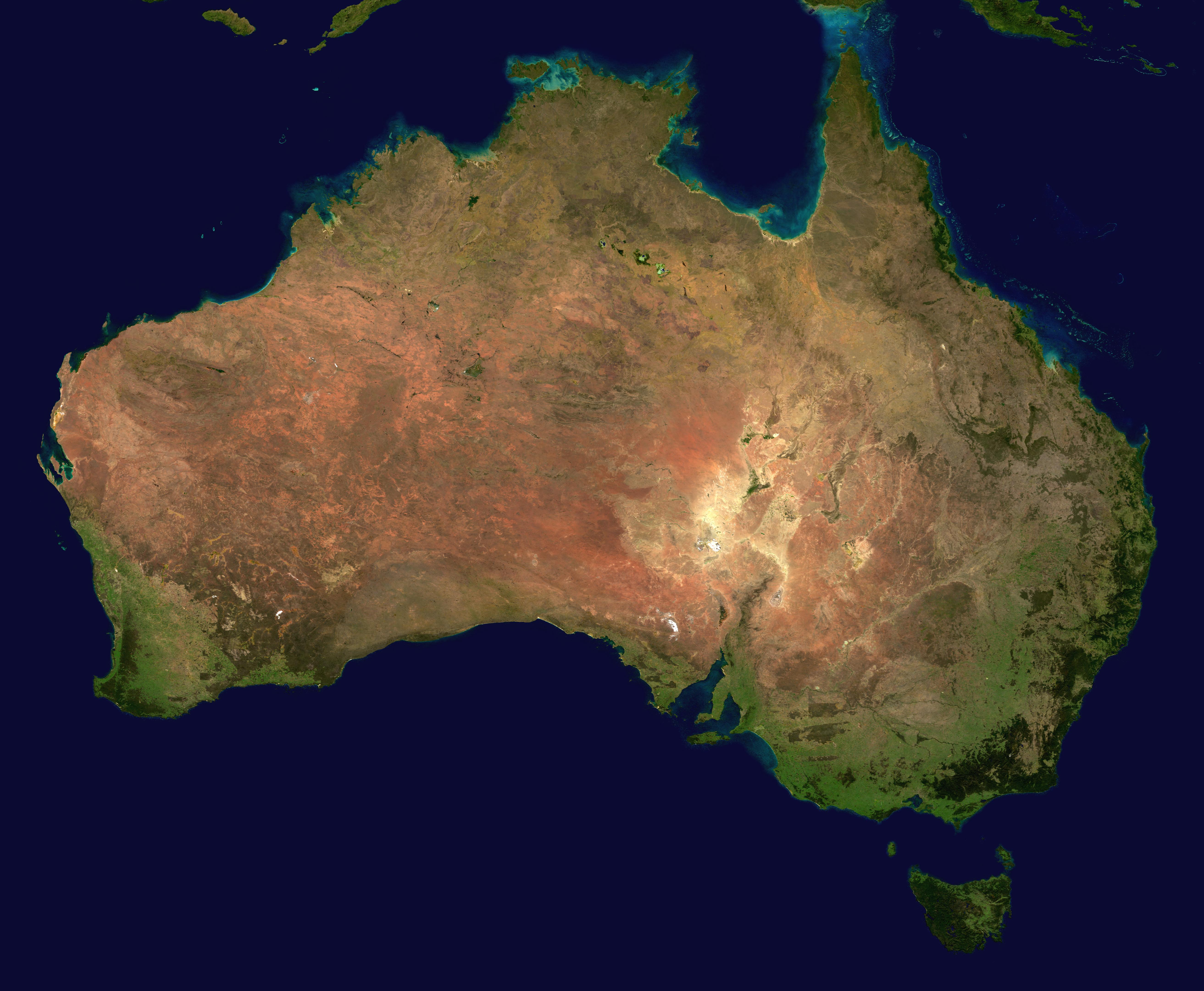
Satellite photo of Australia

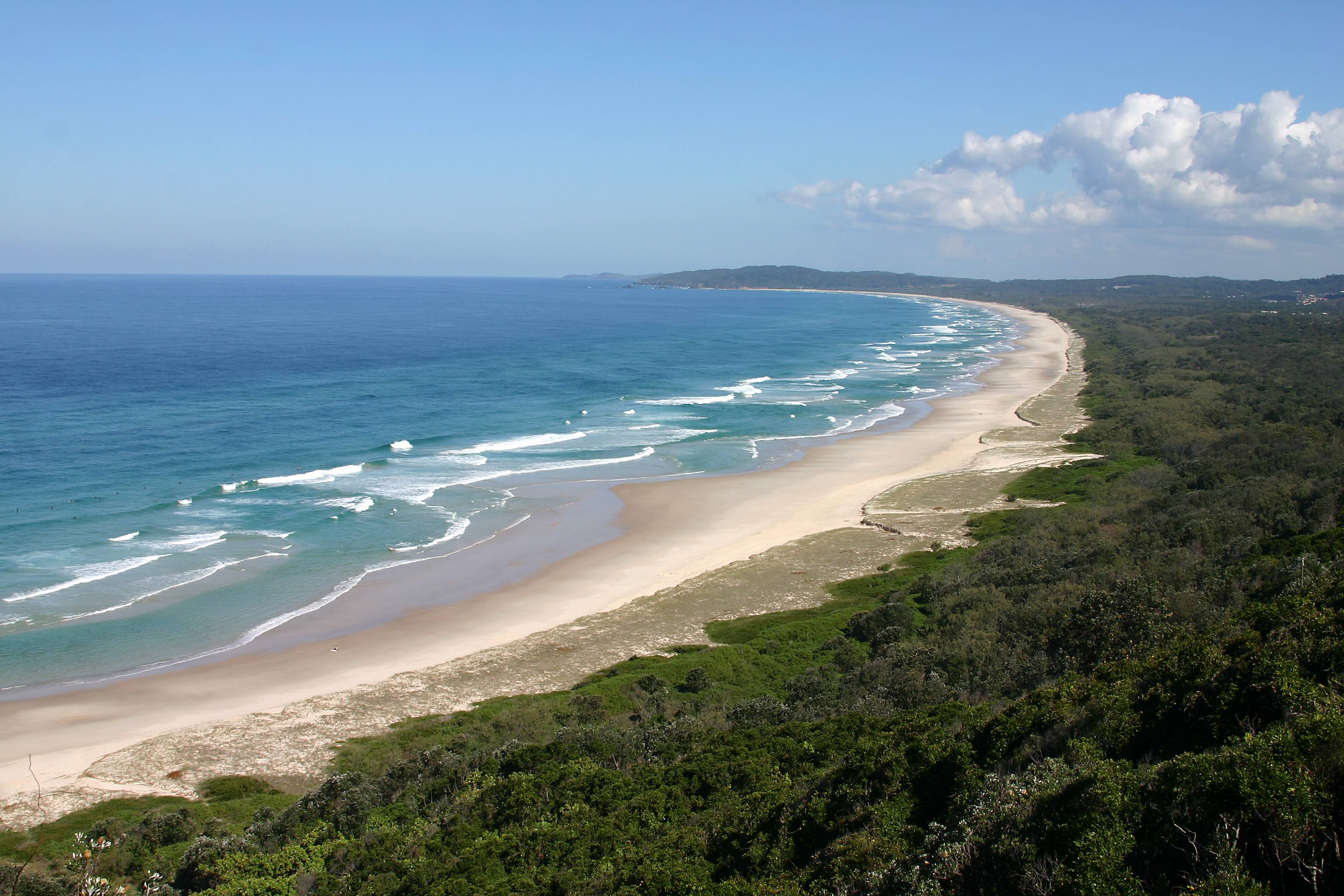
Tallow Beach, Byron Bay, New South Wales

The coastline of Australia comprises the coasts of mainland Australia and Tasmania. It nominally includes a part of all Australian states and territories; the otherwise landlocked Australian Capital Territory has a coastal enclave at Jervis Bay Territory. The coastline determines the baseline for the measurements of Australia's maritime zones. Coastal erosion and sea level rise affect Australia's coastal communities and in the future may force the baselines to be pushed further inland.

According to The World Factbook, Australia has the sixth longest coastline in the world, at 25,760 kilometres (16,010 mi). According to the World Resources Institute, Australia has the sixth longest coastline in the world, at 66,530 kilometres (41,340 mi).

Due to the historical context of European discovery and exploration, the coastline has been the first point of contact over 400 years.

In the IBRA bioregionalisation, the coast has 36 coastal bioregions that define the whole coast and there is the more complex Integrated Marine and Coastal Regionalisation of Australia, which includes ecological features that are beyond the shoreline.

== Coastal Baselines ==
Australia's coastline serves as the territorial sea baseline for the measurement of various maritime zones, including the EEZ, that belong to the country. Article 5 of UNCLOS states that the normal baseline, which is used in carrying out the measurement, is the low-water line along the coast. To get to the low-water line, Australia uses the Lowest Astronomical Tide.

The coast plays an important part in establishing the baseline of the country. The coastline of Australia has a lot of indentations and islands that connect to the coastline with the help of straight baselines. Waters that lie between straight baselines are classified as internal waters. Australia, therefore, has many straight baselines because of the complex coastline of the country. For example, some islands that lie within its reefs and atolls will have some straight baselines connecting them with the coast, which is allowed by Article 6 of UNCLOS. Some parts of the Great Barrier Reef make it possible for Australia to push back its baseline out into the ocean using some straight baselines.

== Coastal Erosion and Sea-Level Rise ==
Australia’s coast has changed and continues to change and erode due to its wave activity, storms, tides, and rising sea levels. When waves and currents remove sand, soil, or rock from the shoreline, erosion occurs. This causes coastal areas to shrink and move further inland. Even though beaches can recover from minor erosion, if erosion events happen constantly, it can cause permanent damage and change the coastline forever.

Extreme weather events like coastal storms, cyclones, surges, flooding, and even tsunamis cause the most significant coastal erosion events. These extreme weather events create the perfect conditions for sand to be removed from beaches and dunes. They may even cause landslides along cliffs. These erosion events have caused hundreds of billions of dollars in damage to coastal communities and the nature around them.

The rising sea levels increase the severity of all of these coastal weather events. During the past century, the sea level in Australia has risen about 20 centimetres, and by 2090 it is predicted to rise anywhere between 39 and 63 centimeters.

Geoscience Australia has monitored coastal erosion through the Digital Earth Australia (DEA) Coastlines project since 1988. They use satellite images and tidal modelling to track the changes made to Australia’s coastline. The information gathered from the DEA helps identify where coastal erosion is most prominent.

== Coastline length ==
Coastline length of Australia
State/territory	Mainland coastline length		Island length		Total coastline length	
State/territory	km	mi	km	mi	km	mi
Australia	35,877	22,293	23,859	14,825	59,736	37,118
Australian Capital Territory	–	–	–	–	–	–
Jervis Bay Territory	54	34	3	1.9	57	35
New South Wales	2,007	1,247	130	81	2,137	1,328
Northern Territory	5,437	3,378	5,516	3,427	10,953	6,806
Queensland	6,973	4,333	6,374	3,961	13,347	8,293
South Australia	3,816	2,371	1,251	777	5,067	3,148
Tasmania	2,833	1,760	2,049	1,273	4,882	3,034
Victoria	1,868	1,161	644	400	2,512	1,561
Western Australia	12,889	8,009	7,892	4,904	20,781	12,913

== See also ==
- Geography of Australia
