= Johannes Böhm =

Johannes Böhm may refer to:

- Johannes Böhm (geologist)
- Johannes Böhm (politician)
