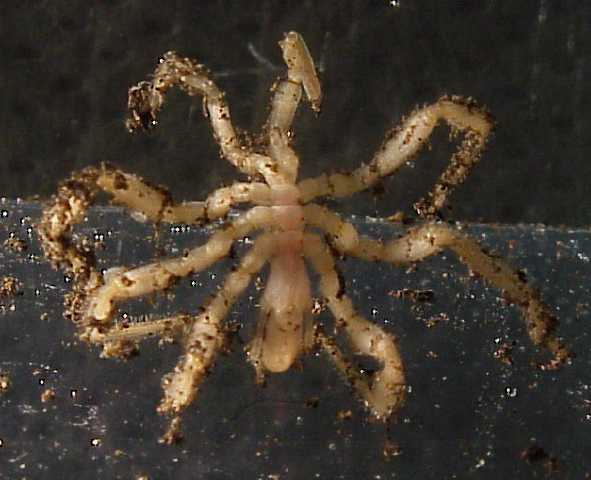
- Sericosura verenae

Scientific classification
- Kingdom: Animalia
- Phylum: Arthropoda
- Subphylum: Chelicerata
- Class: Pycnogonida
- Order: Pantopoda
- Family: Ammotheidae; Dohrn, 1881

= Ammotheidae =

Ammotheidae Temporal range: Jurassic–present

Family of sea spiders

Ammotheidae is a family of sea spiders. It is the most diverse sea spider family, with 297 species described in more than 20 genera, of which only Nymphopsis and Sericosura have been found to be monophyletic. Despite this internal taxonomic uncertainty, studies of 18S rRNA support the monophyly of the family, and its subdivision into two subfamilies, Achelinae and Ammotheinae.

== Genera ==
The family Ammotheidae comprises the following genera:

- Achelia Hodge, 1864
- Acheliana Arnaud, 1971
- Ammothea Leach, 1814
- Ammothella Verrill, 1900
- Austroraptus Hodgson, 1907
- Biammothea Pushkin, 1993
- Cilunculus Loman, 1908
- Dromedopycnon Child, 1982
- Elassorhis Child, 1982
- Hedgpethius Child, 1974
- Hemichela Stock, 1954
- Megarhethus Child, 1982
- Nymphopsis Haswell, 1885
- Oorhynchus Hoek, 1881
- Paranymphon Caullery, 1896
- Proboehmia Stock, 1991
- Prototrygaeus Stock, 1975
- Scipiolus Loman, 1908
- Sericosura Fry & Hedgpeth, 1969
- Tanystylum Miers, 1879
- Teratonotum Sabroux, Corbari, Krapp, Bonillo, Le Prieur & Hassanin, 2017
- Trygaeus Dohrn, 1881
- Pariboea Philippi, 1843
- Pasithoe Goodsir, 1842

== Diversity gallery ==
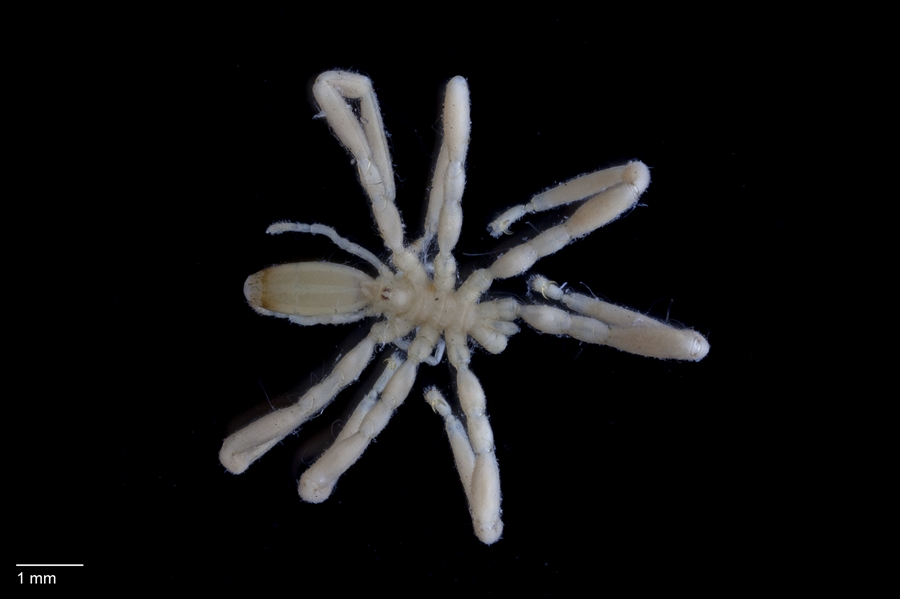
Ammothella biunguiculata

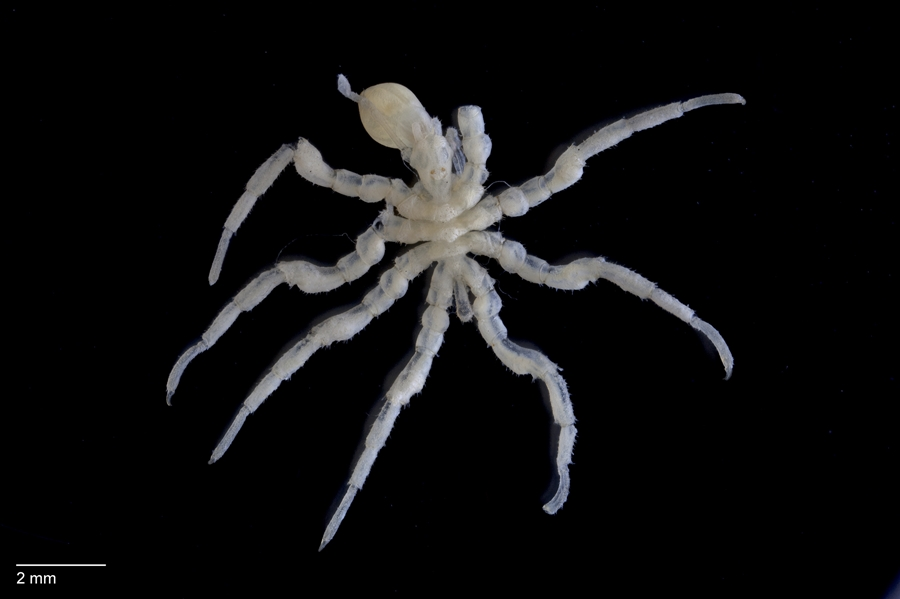
Ascorhynchus compactus

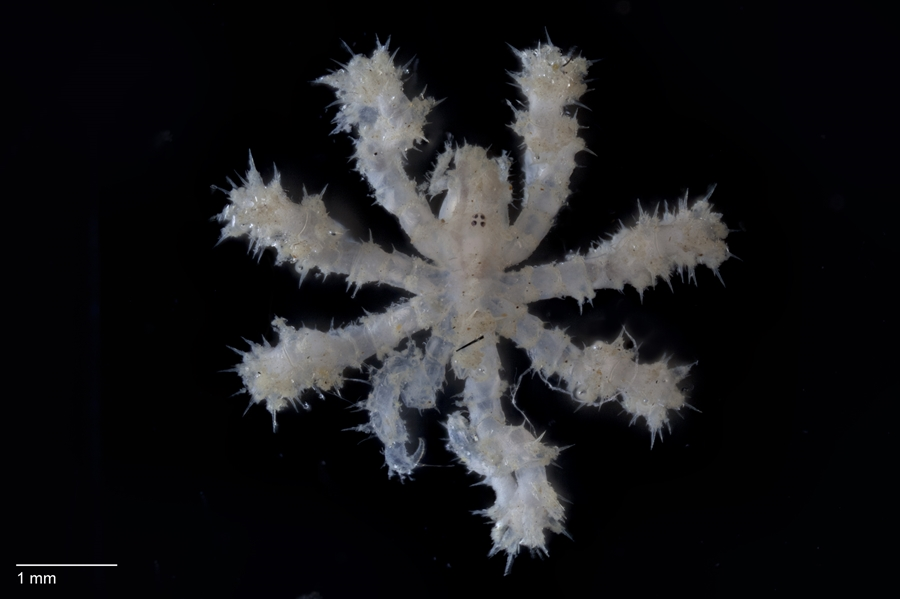
Nymphopsis bathursti

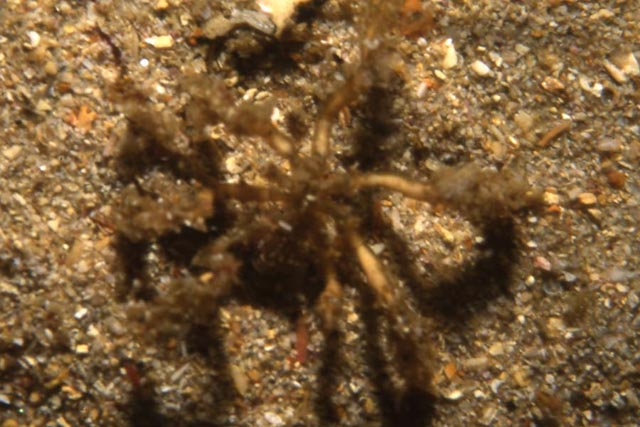
Tanystylum brevipes
