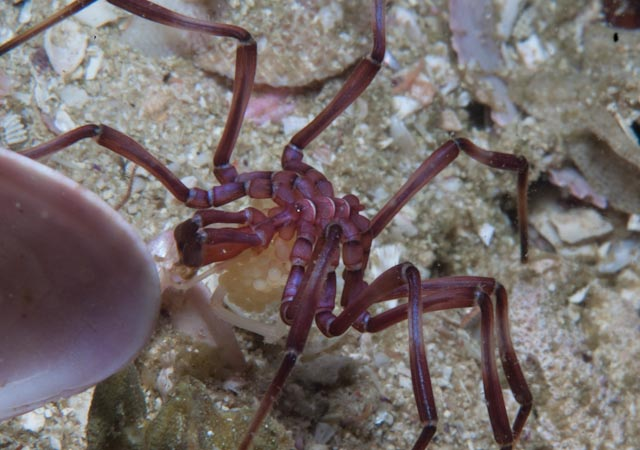

Scientific classification
- Kingdom: Animalia
- Phylum: Arthropoda
- Subphylum: Chelicerata
- Class: Pycnogonida
- Order: Pantopoda
- Family: Nymphonidae
- Genus: Nymphon
- Species: N. signatum

Binomial name
- Nymphon signatum Möbius, 1902

= Nymphon signatum =

Species of sea spider

Nymphon signatum, the scarlet sea spider, is a species of sea spider.

== Distribution ==
This species is endemic to the South African coast, found exclusively between Cape Point and Port Alfred.

== Description ==
The scarlet sea spider measures 40-50 mm in diameter and features a bright red body with long legs. Both sexes possess a pair of legs adapted for holding the egg mass.

== Ecology ==
This species is typically associated with hydroids.
