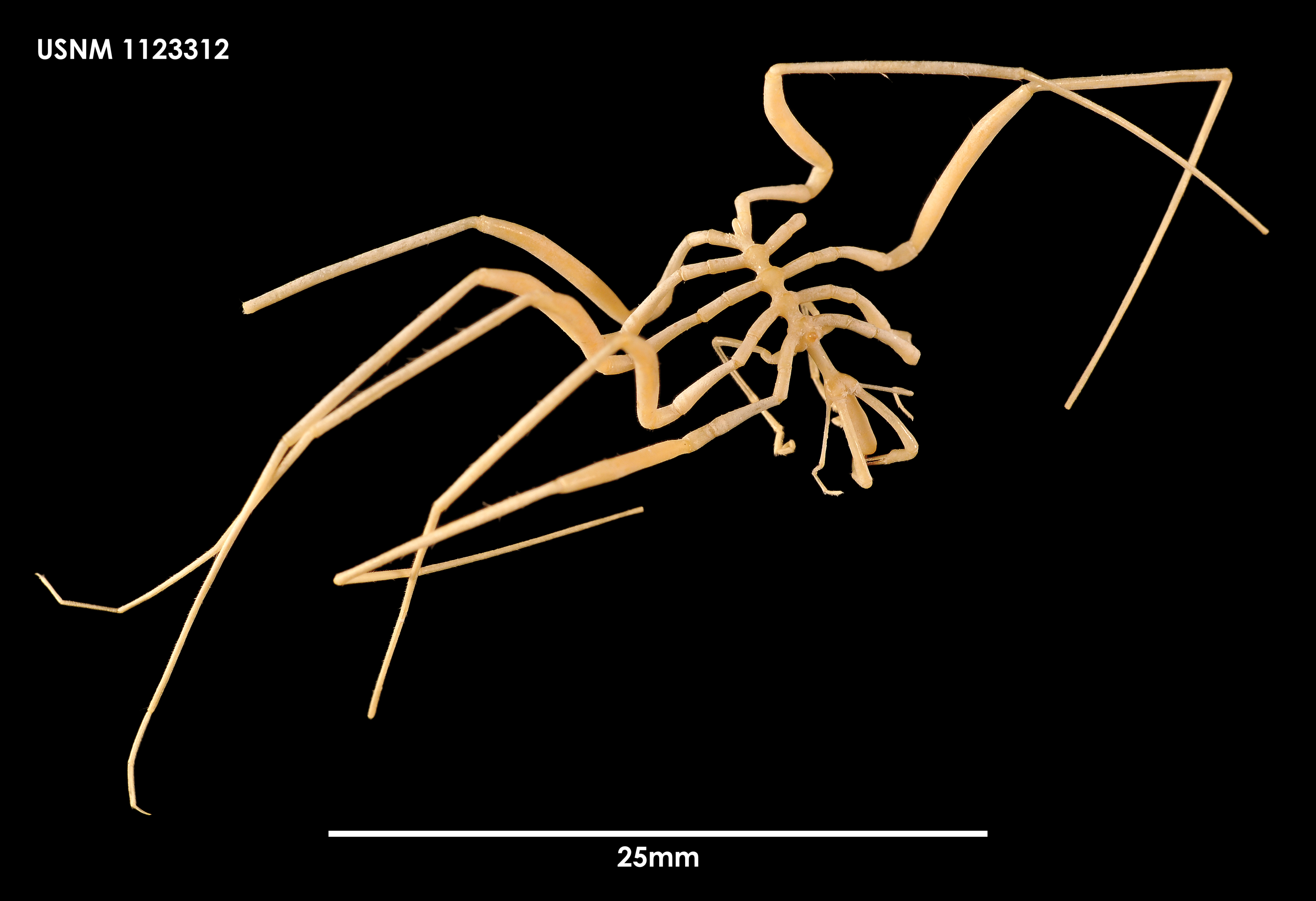
- Pentanymphon antarcticum

Scientific classification
- Kingdom: Animalia
- Phylum: Arthropoda
- Subphylum: Chelicerata
- Class: Pycnogonida
- Order: Pantopoda
- Family: Nymphonidae
- Genus: Pentanymphon; Hodgson, 1904
- Species: P. antarcticum

Binomial name
- Pentanymphon antarcticum Hodgson, 1904

= Pentanymphon =

Genus of sea spiders

Pentanymphon is a monotypic genus of sea spider (class Pycnogonida) in the family Nymphonidae. The only species in this genus is Pentanymphon antarcticum. As the name of this genus suggests, this genus is among the four genera of sea spiders with five pairs of legs in adults instead of the usual four leg pairs. The species P. antarcticum was the second polymerous (i.e., extra-legged) sea spider to be discovered.

== Discovery and taxonomy ==
This genus and its only species were first described in 1904 by the British biologist Thomas V. Hodgson. He based the original description of this sea spider on 28 specimens including both sexes collected during the British National Antarctic Expedition. The Royal Research Ship Discovery collected these specimens in Winter Quarters Bay in McMurdo Sound from depths ranging from 12 to 125 fathoms. Hodgson named this genus to indicate that this species would be placed in the genus Nymphon but for the presence of a fifth pair of legs.

In 1944, the Scottish zoologist Isabella Gordon described P. minutum as the second species in this genus. The species P. minutum was described as a smaller version of P. antarcticum, with both sea spiders found in the same regions of the Antarctic. Authorities now deem P. minutum to be a junior synonym of P. antarcticum, however, and regard these sea spiders as belonging to the same species.

== Phylogeny ==
Multiple phylogenetic studies of sea spiders using molecular data find the genus Pentanymphon nested within the genus Nymphon in a phylogenetic tree. Thus, the genus Nymphon is paraphyletic with respect to Pentanymphon. This evidence suggests that Pentanymphon evolved from octopodous (i.e., eight-legged) ancestors in the genus Nymphon.

== Description ==
The body of this sea spider is smooth and very slender, and the adult features five pairs of long legs that are similar in size and proportions. Each leg ends in a well developed claw and features four rows of setae on the last four joints. The chelifores are well developed and each feature two joints: the basal segment (scape) and the slender chelae, which are shorter than the scape. The chelae each feature a uniform row of short teeth set closely together. The palps each feature five joints. The ovigers are present in each sex and each feature ten joints with a single row of toothed spines on the four most distal joints and a row of narrow teeth on a claw at the distal end. Specimens in this genus exhibit significant variation in size. The trunk can range from 2.8 mm to 6.6 mm in length. The legs are about five times as long as the trunk and can reach 36 mm in length.

Sea spiders in the genus Pentanymphon share many traits with their octopodous relatives in the genus Nymphon. For example, both genera feature well developed chelifores, five-jointed palps, and ten-jointed ovigers with a single row of toothed spines on the four terminal joints. The sea spiders in the genus Pentanymphon are especially similar to another species found in the same waters, Nymphon hiemale, in terms of their general appearance and the form of their chelae. For example, both sea spiders feature smooth and slender bodies and long legs, each with setae on the distal joints and a well developed terminal claw. Furthermore, both sea spiders feature curved chelae with slender fingers, each with a row of uniform teeth.

The sea spiders in the genus Pentanymphon are distinguished from N. hiemale based largely on the number of legs, with only subtle differences in other traits. For example, the most distal joint before the claw on the leg (propodus) tends to be longer relative to the next most distal joint (tarsus) in P. antarcticum compared to N. hiemale. Furthermore, N. hiemale tends to be somewhat larger, with a trunk reaching 7.2 mm in length and legs more than seven times as long the trunk.

== Distribution ==
The species P. antarcticum is widely distributed around Antarctica. This sea spider has a circumpolar distribution in the Antarctic zone and is found at depths ranging from 3 to 3227 meters below the surface. This species is endemic to the Southern Ocean.
