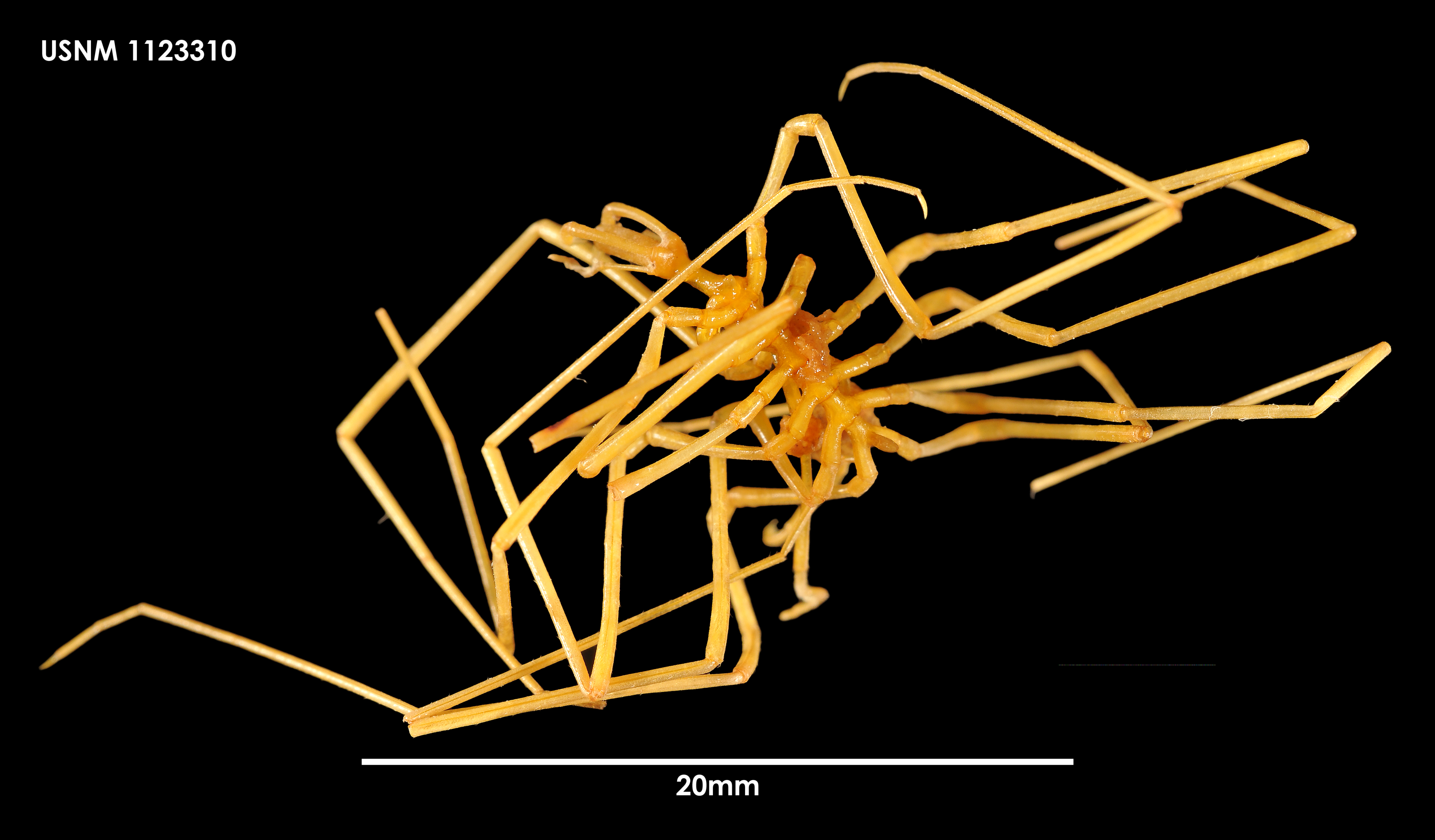
- Sexanymphon mirabilis

Scientific classification
- Kingdom: Animalia
- Phylum: Arthropoda
- Subphylum: Chelicerata
- Class: Pycnogonida
- Order: Pantopoda
- Family: Nymphonidae
- Genus: Sexanymphon; Hedgpeth & Fry, 1964
- Species: S. mirabilis

Binomial name
- Sexanymphon mirabilis Hedgpeth & Fry, 1964

= Sexanymphon =

Genus of sea spiders

Sexanymphon is a monotypic genus of sea spider (class Pycnogonida) in the family Nymphonidae. The only species in this genus is Sexanymphon mirabilis. As the name of this genus implies, sea spiders in this genus feature six pairs of legs in adults instead of the usual four leg pairs. The species S. mirabilis is notable as one of only two species of sea spiders with six leg pairs. This species is found in the Southern Ocean.

== Discovery ==
This genus and its only species were first described in 1964 by the American marine biologist Joel W. Hedgpeth and the British zoologist William G. Fry. They based the original description of this genus and this species on eight adult specimens (five females and three males). These specimens were collected in Antarctic waters at a depth of about 2,800 meters below the surface. The female holotype and male allotype are deposited in the National Museum of Natural History in Washington, D.C., and two paratypes are deposited in the Natural History Museum in London.

== Description ==
The adult in this species has six pairs of extremely long and slender legs. In the eight type specimens, the fourth leg ranges from 18.3 mm to 29.5 mm in length, whereas the trunk ranges from 3.6 mm to 4.7 mm in length, and the proboscis ranges from 1.5 mm to 2.1 mm in length. Both the trunk and the proboscis are smooth. Each leg ends in a claw that is about half as long as the adjacent segment (propodus), which is about as long as the next most distal segment (tarsus).

The chelae persist in adults and are well developed, reaching beyond the tip of the proboscis. The basal segment (scape) is slender and only slightly curved. The fingers are slightly curved, and each finger features teeth that are about the same size as one another. The moving finger is slightly longer than the other and features 12 to 16 fine teeth, whereas the immobile finger features 13 to 19 teeth.

Each of the palps features five segments. The palps in the type specimens range from 2.3 mm to 3.0 mm in length. The ovigers are well developed in each sex, and each oviger features 10 segments plus a terminal claw. Each oviger features a row of toothed spines on the four terminal segments. The ovigers in the type specimens range from 6.2 mm to 9.9 mm in length. The fifth segment of the oviger is the longest segment in each sex but is especially elongated in the males, which feature ovigers that are longer relative to the legs than the ovigers in the females.

Sea spiders in the genus Sexanymphon share many traits with their octopodous relatives in the genus Nymphon. For example, both genera feature well developed chelifores, five-segmented palps, and ten-segmented ovigers with a single row of toothed spines on the four terminal segments. The sea spiders in the genus Sexanymphon can be distinguished from their relatives in the genus Nymphon, however, based on the number of legs.

== Distribution ==
The species S. mirabilis is endemic to the Antarctic region. This species has been recorded in the Scotia Sea and off the Antarctic Peninsula in the Antarctic zone. This sea spider is found at depths ranging from 1,687 to 2,897 meters below the surface.
