= Nymphon brevitarse =

Scientific classification
- Kingdom: Animalia
- Phylum: Arthropoda
- Subphylum: Chelicerata
- Class: Pycnogonida
- Order: Pantopoda
- Family: Nymphonidae
- Genus: Nymphon
- Species: N. brevitarse

Binomial name
- Nymphon brevitarse Krøyer, 1844

Species of sea spider

Nymphon brevitarse is a species of sea spider first described by Henrik Nikolai Krøyer in 1844.

== Habitat ==
This species inhabits the benthic zone. It is found between the shelf and the slope of the ocean floor at a depth of around 100-200m.

== Distribution ==
Found in the Pacific and Arctic oceans. Has been noted to be a northern species.
