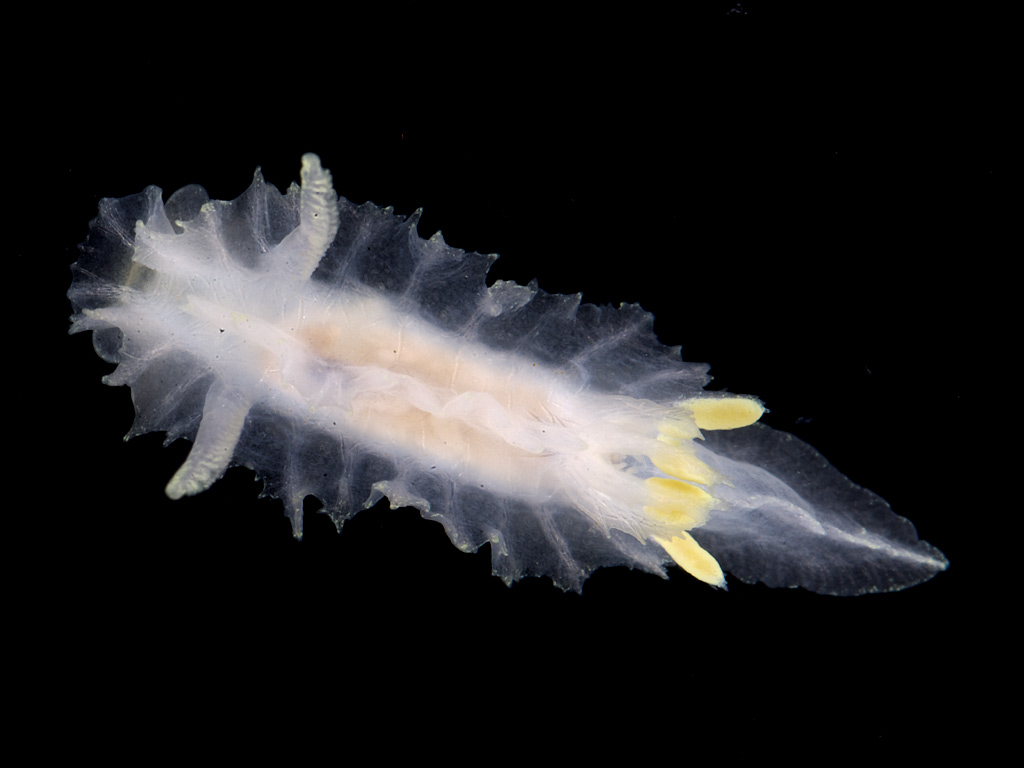
- The nudibranch Lophodoris danielsseni, Gulen Dive Resort, Norway

Scientific classification
- Kingdom: Animalia
- Phylum: Mollusca
- Class: Gastropoda
- Order: Nudibranchia
- Family: Goniodorididae
- Genus: Lophodoris
- Species: L. danielsseni

Binomial name
- Lophodoris danielsseni Friele & Hansen, 1876

= Lophodoris danielsseni =

Species of gastropod

Lophodoris danielsseni is a species of sea slug, a Dendronotid nudibranch, a marine gastropod mollusc in the family Goniodorididae.

== Distribution ==
This species was first described from Norway. It has subsequently been reported from a few localities between Bergen and Tromsø.

== Description ==
This goniodorid nudibranch is white in colour.

== Ecology ==
Lophodoris danielsseni feeds on bryozoans.

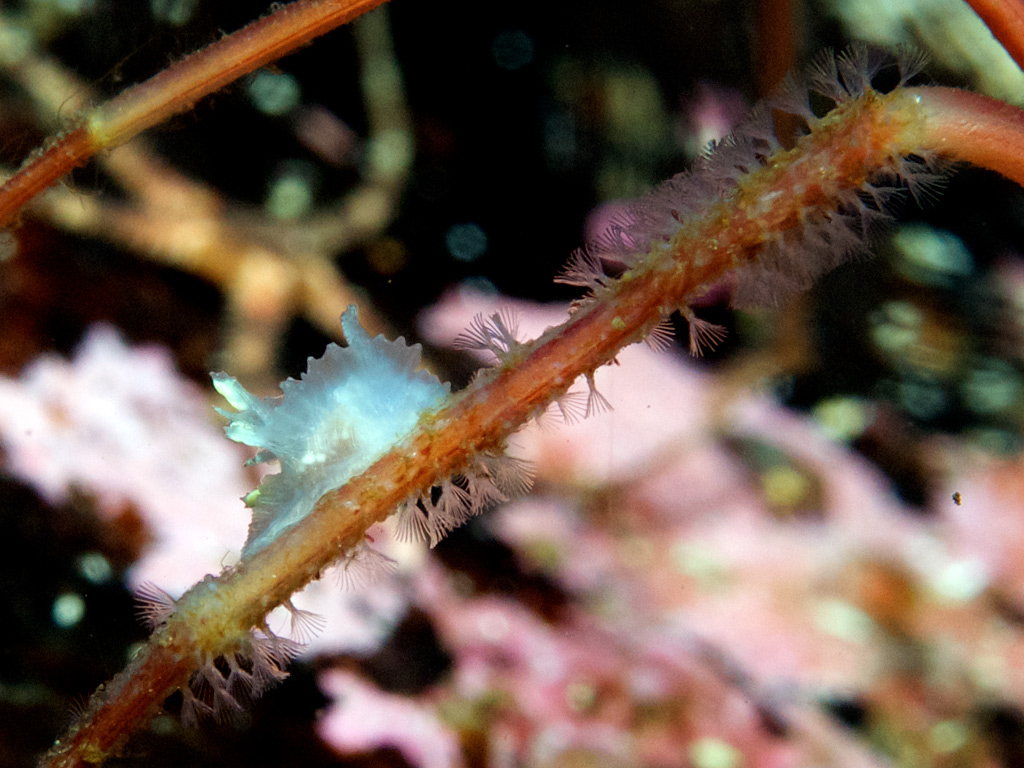
The nudibranch Lophodoris danielsseni eats a bryozoan growing on the leg of a pycnogonid, Nymphon leptocheles.
