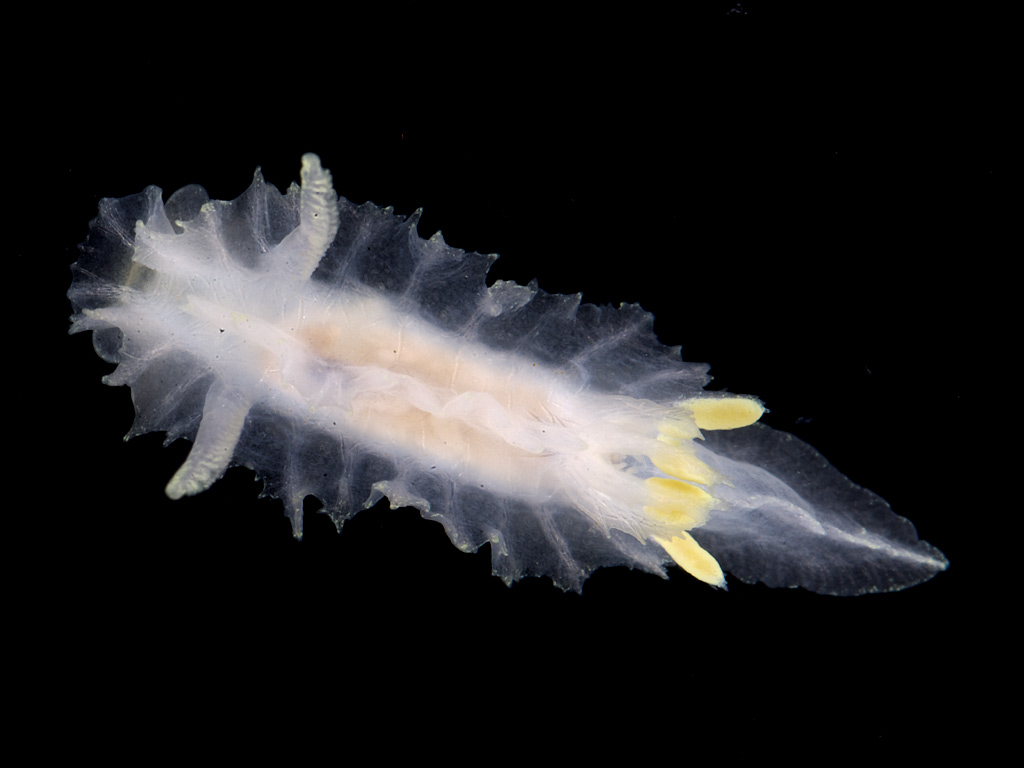
- Lophodoris danielsseni

Scientific classification
- Kingdom: Animalia
- Phylum: Mollusca
- Class: Gastropoda
- Order: Nudibranchia
- Family: Goniodorididae
- Genus: Lophodoris (Sars, 1878 = nomen nudum) Odhner, 1922

= Lophodoris =

Genus of gastropods

Lophodoris is a small genus of sea slugs, specifically dorid nudibranchs, marine gastropod molluscs in the family Goniodorididae.

== Species ==
This genus is little studied and there have been only a few observations.

- Lophodoris danielsseni (Friele & Hansen, 1876) (originally described as Goniodoris danielsseni Friele & Hansen, 1876 ) : found in the Norwegian Sea and Southern Greenland.
- Lophodoris scala Marcus & Marcus, 1970 : found only in the neighborhood of São Paulo, Brazil where this small nudibranch (2 - 2.5 mm long) was collected from the intertidal burrow (15 – 30 cm deep) of an echiurid worm Lissomyema exilii, feeding on Entoprocts.
