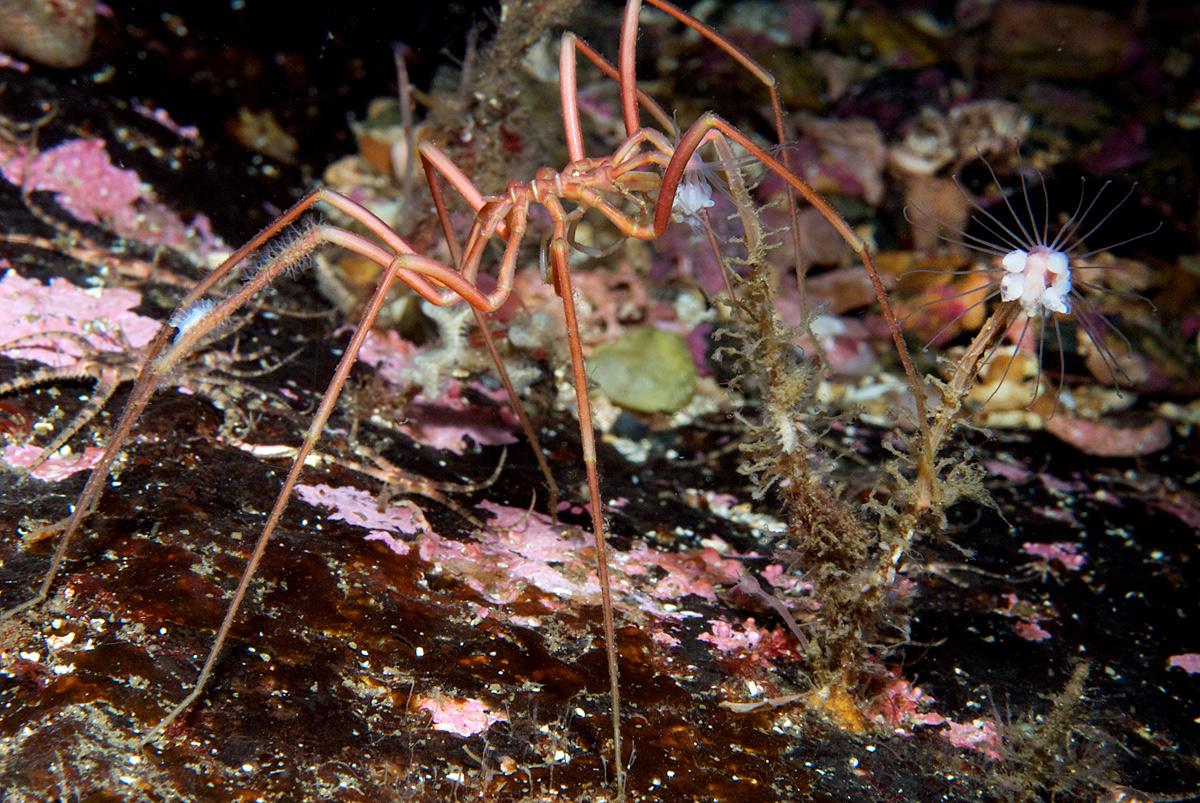
- The pycnogonid Nymphon leptocheles grazes on a hydroid Tubularia indivisa whilst a nudibranch Lophodoris danielsseni eats a bryozoan growing on its leg.

Scientific classification
- Kingdom: Animalia
- Phylum: Arthropoda
- Subphylum: Chelicerata
- Class: Pycnogonida
- Order: Pantopoda
- Family: Nymphonidae
- Genus: Nymphon
- Species: N. leptocheles

Binomial name
- Nymphon leptocheles Sars, 1888

= Nymphon leptocheles =

Species of sea spider

Nymphon leptocheles is a species of sea spider first described by Georg Ossian Sars in 1888. The species greatly resembles other members of the genus Nymphon, and species identification from morphological traits alone is therefore a complex task.

== Habitat ==
The species inhabits the sublittoral zone and occurs amongst hydroids and sea anemones.

== Diet ==
N. leptocheles feeds on coelenterates.
