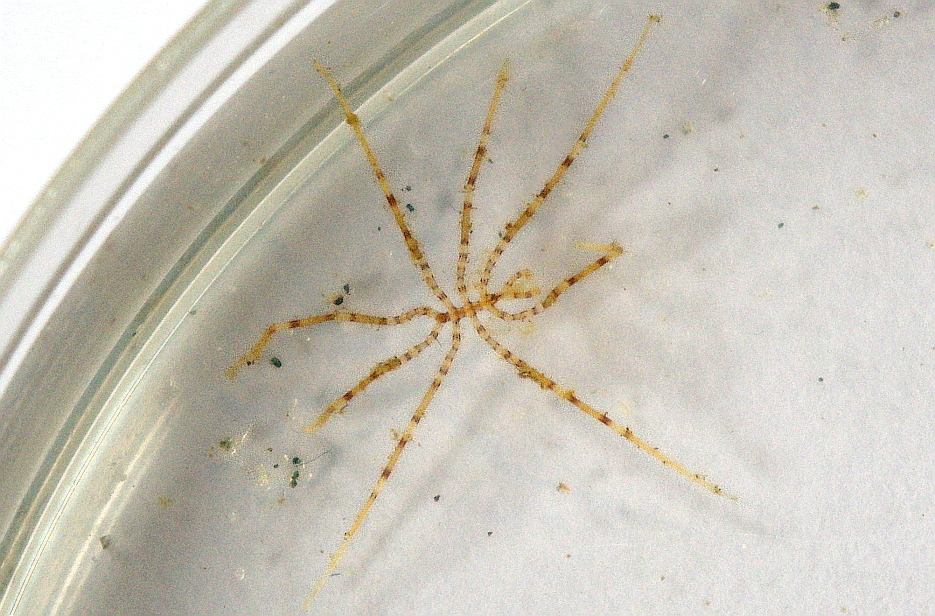

Scientific classification
- Kingdom: Animalia
- Phylum: Arthropoda
- Subphylum: Chelicerata
- Class: Pycnogonida
- Order: Pantopoda
- Family: Nymphonidae
- Genus: Nymphon
- Species: N. brevirostre

Binomial name
- Nymphon brevirostre Hodge, 1863

= Nymphon brevirostre =

Species of sea spider

Nymphon brevirostre is a species of sea spider first described by George Hodge in 1863. The species highly resembles other members of the genus Nymphon (e.g. N. rubrum), and species identification from morphological traits alone is therefore a complex task.

== Morphology ==
Early life stage morphology

White, translucent or reddish, occasionally with violet bands. Slender body (2.5-3.0 mm) and legs that are three and a half times as long. The proboscis is relatively short. The abdomen is thick, and the thoracic segments are broader than long. The palps have five joints. The propodus is longer than the tarsus, which is covered with numerous short spines and three longer ones near the heel.

Later life stage morphology

Morphological characteristics very similar to earlier life stages. Reddish or white. Smooth and slender body (4-5mm) and legs four times this. The cephalon is broad, and the abdomen is relatively short. Male specimens carry the eggs on specially designed appendages (2).

== Habitat ==
The species inhabits the littoral and sublittoral zone to a depth of 60m and occurs amongst hydroids. Its distribution ranges from the Arctic to at least south of Great Britain, and is widely distributed in both the North Sea and the Baltic Sea (2, 3). In the Baltic Sea, this species has been found around Elsinor in Denmark in depths of ~37m amongst dense populations of the hydroids Abietinaria abietina, Alcyonium digitatum and various other hydroids.

== Diet ==
Feeds on e.g. coelenterate species (2,3). The species is able to detect the chemical cues of different hydroids such as Dynamena pumila, Laomeda loveni, Tubularia larynx and Alcyonium digitatum (5).
