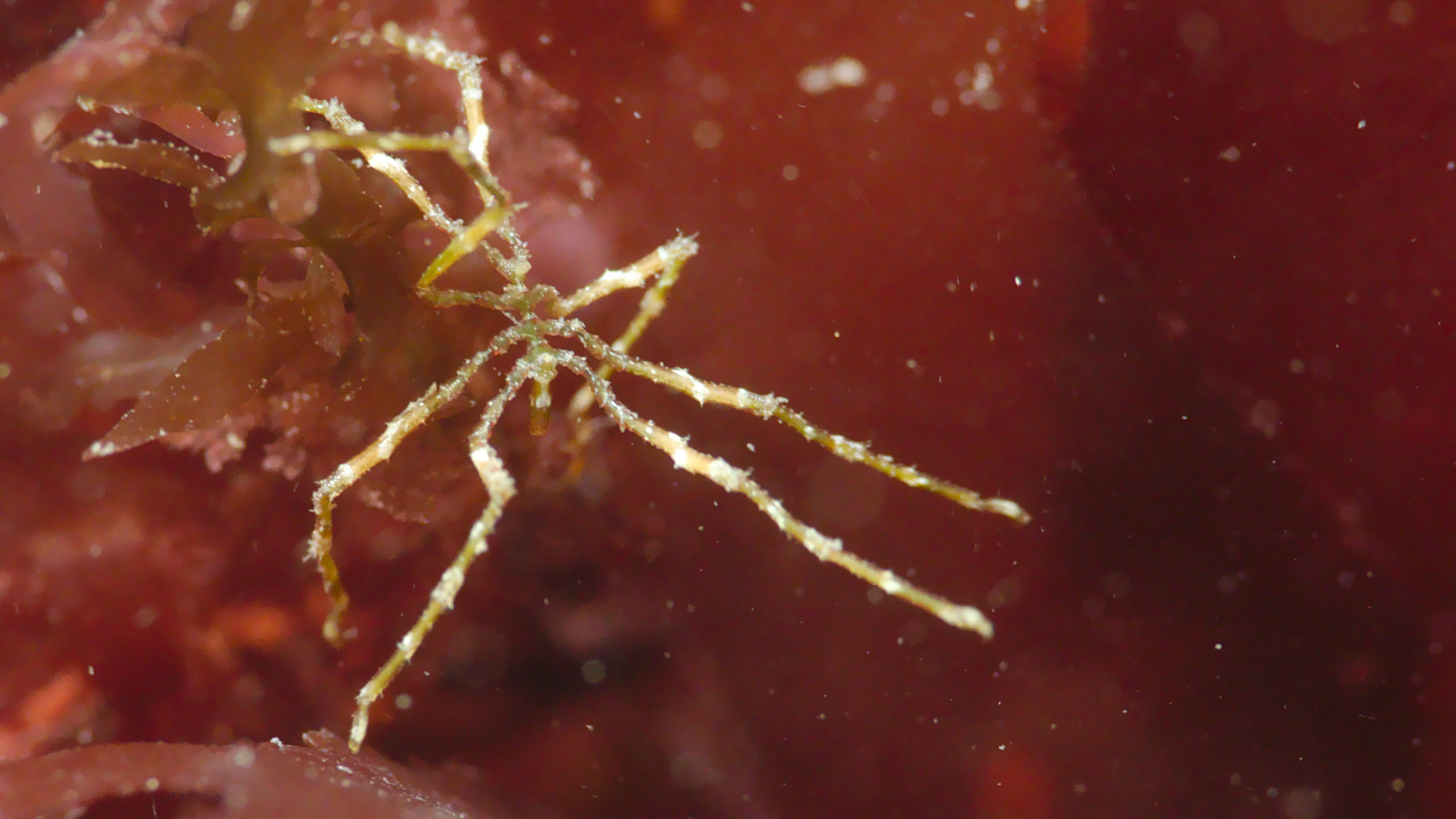

Scientific classification
- Kingdom: Animalia
- Phylum: Arthropoda
- Subphylum: Chelicerata
- Class: Pycnogonida
- Order: Pantopoda
- Family: Nymphonidae
- Genus: Nymphon
- Species: N. gracile

Binomial name
- Nymphon gracile Leach, 1863

= Nymphon gracile =

Species of sea spider

Nymphon gracile is a species of sea spider first described by William Elford Leach in 1863. The species highly resembles other members of the genus Nymphon, and species identification from morphological traits alone is, therefore, a complex task.

== Anatomy and general body description ==
When Willian Elford Leach first described Nymphon gracile, he described it as an organism having a body that consisted of four feet bearing segments with the first segment being head like, with two eyes on each sides, a cylindrical rostrum inserted under the first segment, mandibles longer than the rostrum that is composed of two joints, a six jointed palpi that were inserted under the mandible, and eight feet. He also stated that the egg carrying part of the female is composed of ten joints. In general terms, the body is composed of four segments and has eight legs. Each leg is composed of eight segments (coxa, first trochanter, second trochanter, femur, tibia 1, tibia 2, tarsus, and propodium) and a claw at the end. The first segment of the body has the proboscis, palp, and chelicera coming off of it and the fourth body segment has the anus. There is a general sketch below to give a better idea of what the anatomy of the N. gracile looks like. It has been known to be very difficult to distinguish the different species of sea spiders but the N. gracile does have some characteristics that can help it be recognized a little easier. N. gracile tend to have a rather elongated proboscis and the smooth cylindrical body of the N. gracile can reach a length of about 4mm. There are signs of sexual dimorphism occurring within the species as the males have been known to typically have larger palps and chelifores. Further the proboscis of the juvenile gracile is shorter and broader than that of an adult.

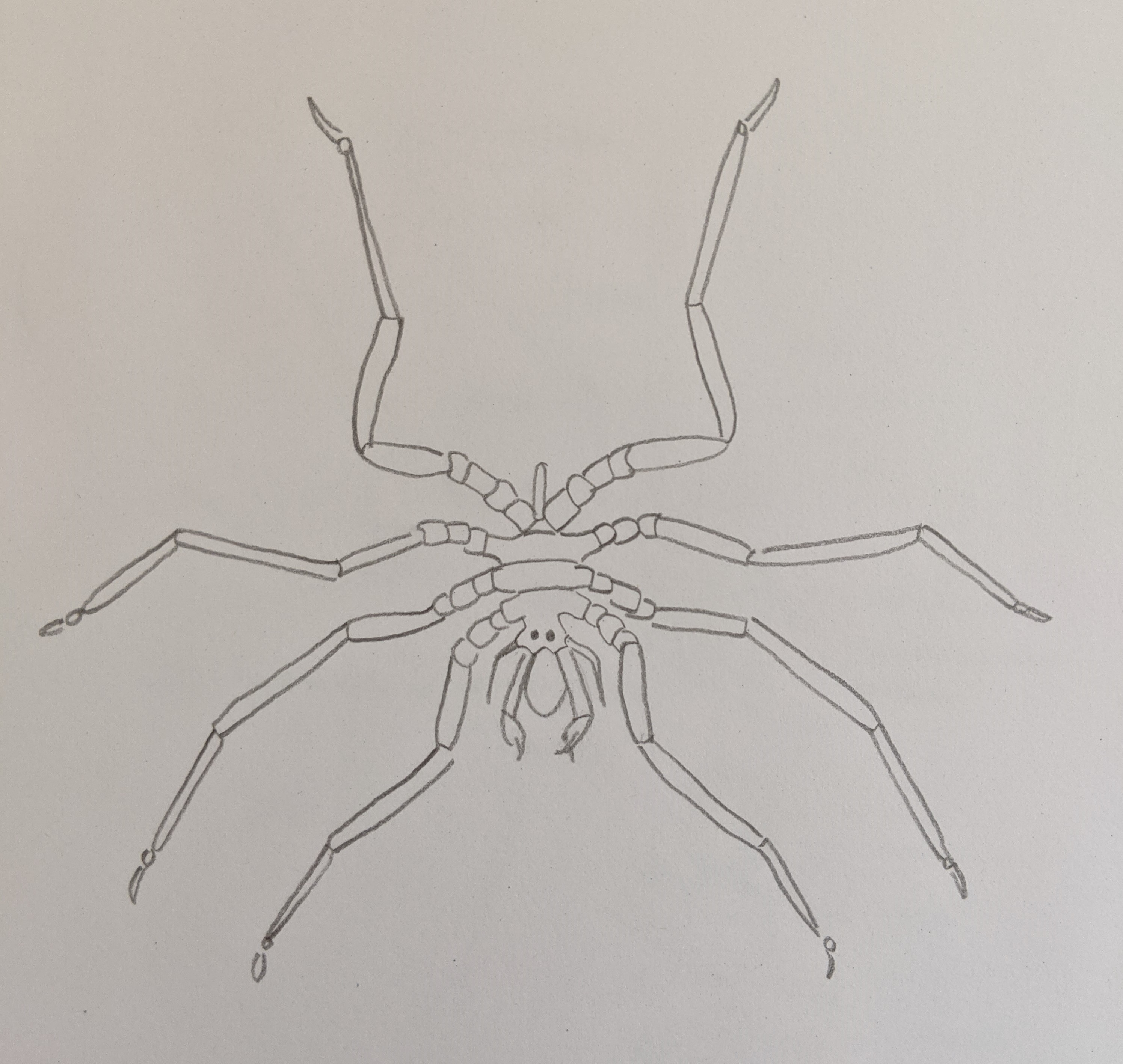
General sketch of a Nymphon gracile

== Distribution and habitat ==
Nymphon gracile occurs in the Northeast Atlantic and in the Mediterranean Sea. The species inhabits the sublittoral zone and occurs amongst hydroids and sea anemones.

== Ecology and behavior ==
=== Food consumption ===
The main organ for food uptake in the species is a triradially symmetric proboscis with a terminal mouth that has three movable lips. The species has laterally positioned chelifores, and dorsally positioned palps. Gland openings near the mouth are suspected to secrete saliva. Food is processed and filtered through the midgut. Intracellular digestion occurs by pinocytosis. The species makes use of all appendages while feeding. Species-specific behavior involves the chelae being used to macerate their prey.

=== Diet ===
The species mainly feeds on coelenterates. The larvae are ectoparasites of hydroids. N. gracile have been observed eating gastropod Nucella eggs in the wild. They have also been seen feeding upon the detritus that had accumulated on their bodies, using their ovigera to pick it up and bring it to their mouth. Since this is their diet, their main source of energy is from lipids and carbohydrate sugars.

=== Swimming ===
The organisms swimming patterns are a hybrid of free-floating and periodic-swimming plankton. The organism appears to prefer free-floating as to reserve energy and only utilizes its ability to swim when necessary for survival. When they do swim it is referred to as a leg-beat cycle or a power stroke. A researcher by the name of Elfed Morgan wanted to know more about these two mechanisms, so he did a study where he collected a handful of N. gracile from Mumbles Point on the Gower peninsula and observed their swimming behavior. He found that there are four pairs of locomotor appendages that are symmetrically arranged around the body. During the leg-beat cycle the legs of the N. gracile beat vertically which causes them to swim with their dorsal side foremost. During the power stroke, the joints between the major segments of the leg are extended for most of the stroke, and there is a recovery stroke after. He concluded his finding by stating how each species of the Nymphon has varied swimming abilities due to having varied lengths of the tibial bristles.

=== Migration ===
N. gracile migrate away from the shore to the sublittoral zone during the winter and return to the shore during the following spring. They found evidence of this seasonal off-shore migration in Louis Frage article about them that was published in 1932. Not only did people find out that they migrated, but they found evidence that this migration also plays a role in their life cycle. Before the migration, they are about the age of a young adult, and when they leave for the sublittoral zone, their fertilization occurs. They then return in the following spring when they are sexually mature or ovigerous. These findings were founded by King and Jarvis in 1970. The only issue is that migration takes a lot of energy. Since N. gracile are weak swimmers and have to move large distances, they depend on tidal or off-shore currents for their transportation up and down the shore. A study done by Elfed Morgan on the cost of migration found that their fuels reserves are just enough for them to successfully take advantage of the better tides because swimming off shore is very energetically expensive for the species. They do not swim for long periods of time. On average, they only spend about 30% of their time swimming normally. So if they had to swim off shore themselves, then they would only last for 15 days before they start resorting to tissue metabolism. This is not including the extra energy expenditure for other factors.

=== Reproduction ===
Eggs develop from August to February and are carried on the ovigerous legs of the male Nymphon gracile. The Vitellogenesis process of the eggs has the yolk synthesized intra-oöcytecally with a small oöcytic contribution. This process is similar to that seen in annelids and Limulus polyphemus. Males become covered in algae or other biota while carrying eggs.

== Genome ==
Nymphon gracile has a circular DNA mitochondrial genome 14,681 bp in length. Compared to other Arthropoda, Nymphon gracile differ in about 10 translocated tRNA genes, 5 tRNA genes, and an inversion of a segment covering 3 coding proteins of the mitochondrial genome sequence. This differentiation between these organisms and these gene rearrangements are happening after the subtaxa of Pycnogonida. Genome sequencing is being used as a phylogenetic marker to see where organisms share evolutionary relationships.
