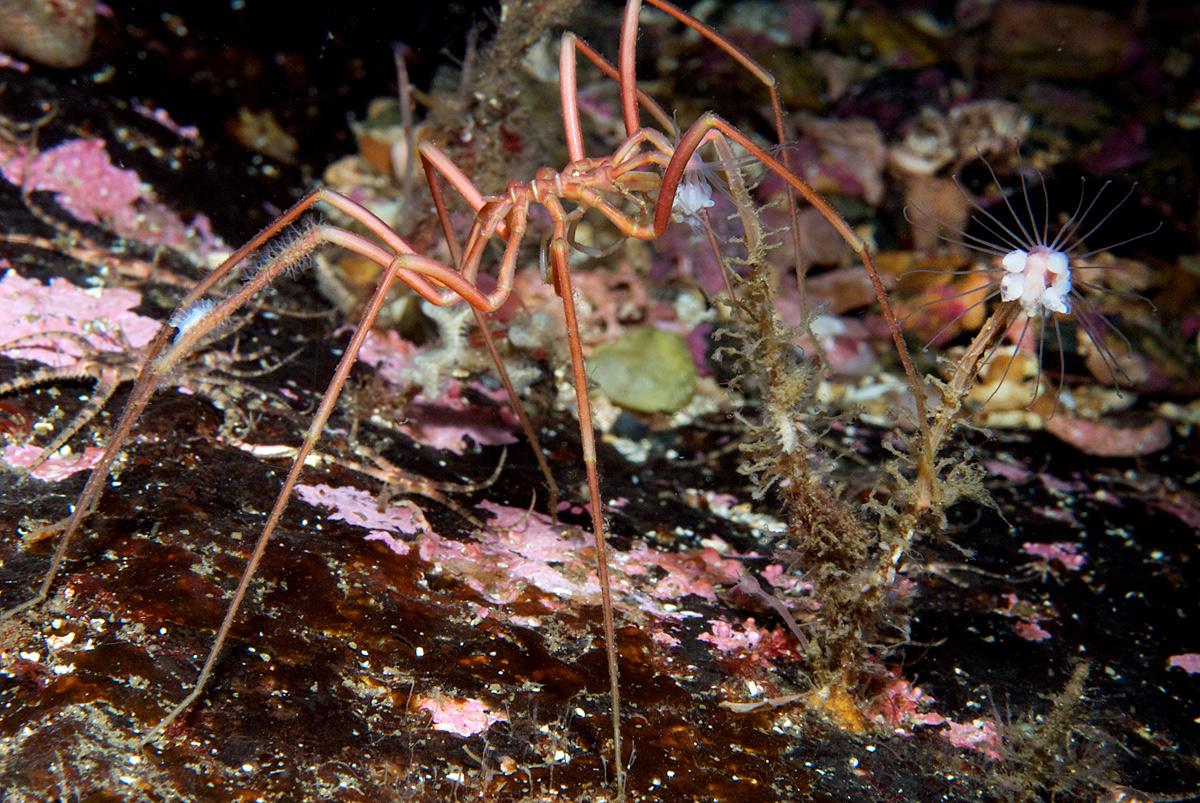
- The pycnogonid Nymphon leptocheles grazes on a hydroid Tubularia indivisa.

Scientific classification
- Kingdom: Animalia
- Phylum: Arthropoda
- Subphylum: Chelicerata
- Class: Pycnogonida
- Order: Pantopoda
- Suborder: Eupantopodida
- Superfamily: Nymphonoidea
- Family: Nymphonidae

Genera
- Boreonymphon; Bradypallene; Heteronymphon; Neonymphon; Nymphon; Pentanymphon; Sexanymphon

Diversity
- 7 genera, 250 species

= Nymphonidae =

Family of sea spiders

Nymphonidae is a family of sea spiders which has representatives in all the oceans. This family contains some 250 species, most of which are found in the genus Nymphon. Nymphonid bodies are between 1 and 15 mm long, the extent between the points of the legs reaching 150 mm. Most species are predators of hydroids. Like most sea spiders, species in this family have four pairs of legs in adults, except for Pentanymphon antarcticum, which has five pairs, and Sexanymphon mirabilis, which has six pairs.

== Taxonomy ==
Seven genera are currently recognized:

- Boreonymphon Sars, 1888 (4 species)
- Bradypallene Kim & Hong, 1987 (1 species)
- Heteronymphon Gordon, 1932 (8 species)
- Neonymphon Stock, 1955 (1 species)
- Nymphon Fabricius, 1794 (> 250 species)
- Pentanymphon Hodgson, 1904 (1 species)
- Sexanymphon Hedgpeth & Fry, 1964 (1 species)

=== Selected species ===
- Nymphon gracile Leach, 1814
- Nymphon brevirostre Hodge, 1863
- Nymphon hirtum Kroyer, 1844
