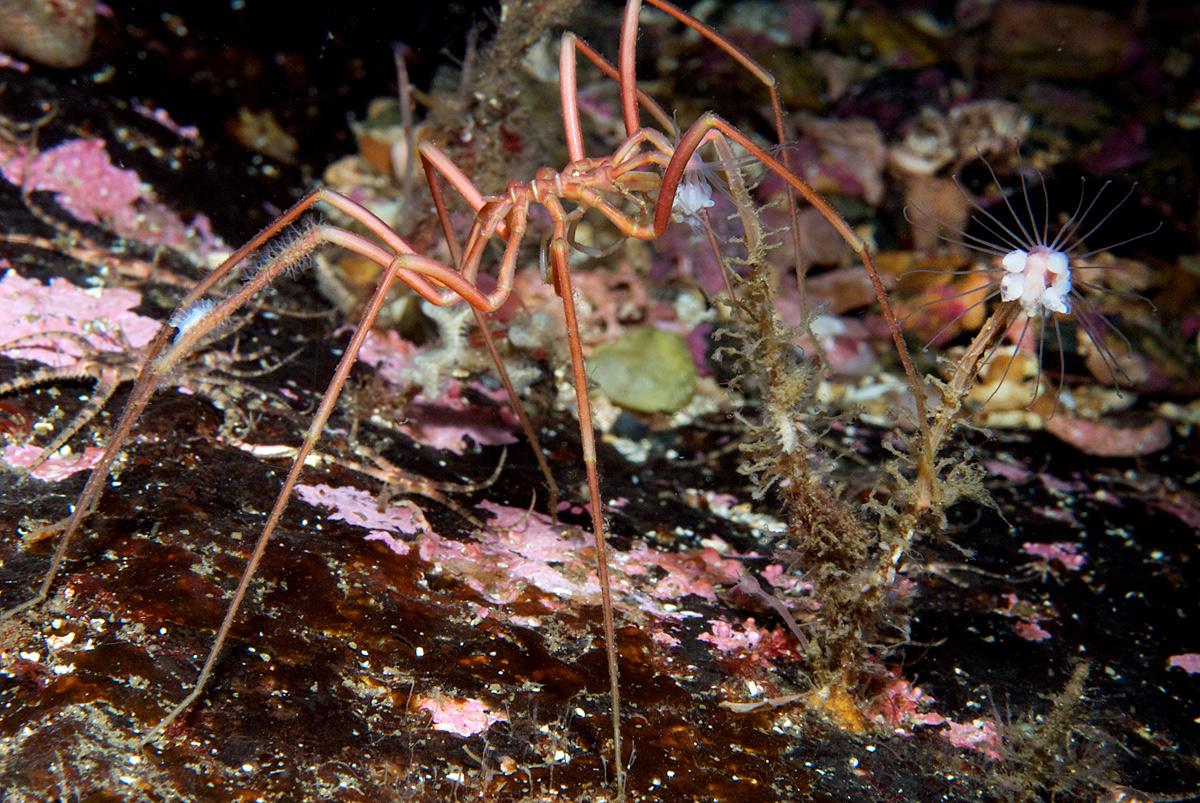
- The pycnogonid Nymphon leptocheles grazes on a hydroid Tubularia indivisa.

Scientific classification
- Kingdom: Animalia
- Phylum: Arthropoda
- Subphylum: Chelicerata
- Class: Pycnogonida
- Order: Pantopoda
- Family: Nymphonidae
- Genus: Nymphon; Fabricius, 1794

= Nymphon =

Genus of sea spiders

Nymphon is a genus of sea spiders in the family Nymphonidae. The species within this genus are all benthic organisms found in most major oceans across the globe from the littoral zones to the deep sea, with a strong distribution around polar regions: Arctic and Antarctic waters. Out of the sea spider genus, Nymphon is the most diverse with over 200 species that have been described, with a majority of them being found in the Southern Ocean region. This genus may also contain bioluminescent species.

== Distribution ==
Sea spiders in general are found all around the globe. The Nymphon genus has been commonly found in waters of higher latitudes and is associated with polar regions and having a more circumpolar distribution than other genus of sea spider. They are extremely abundant within polar regions, with Nymphon having the most species found in polar waters. In relation to the benthos, mainly inhabit marine fauna and are often found around sessile communities.

== Feeding ==
Generally, it is thought that Nymphon feed on hydroids, actinians, bryozoans, molluscs, annelids, crustaceans, and detritus. They have strong associations with corals and algae. However, feeding behavior in relation to coral and algae has not been observed and there is no current evidence of finding coral or algae material in their gut.

== Species ==
- Nymphon aculeatum Child, 1994
- Nymphon adami Giltay, 1937
- Nymphon adareanum Hodgson, 1907
- Nymphon adenense Muller, 1989
- Nymphon adenopus Stock, 1991
- Nymphon aemulum Stock, 1975
- Nymphon aequidigitatum Haswell, 1885
- Nymphon akanei Nakamura & Child, 1983
- Nymphon akanthochoeros Bamber & Thurston, 1995
- Nymphon albatrossi Hedgpeth, 1949
- Nymphon aldabrense Child, 1988
- Nymphon andamanense Calman, 1923
- Nymphon andriashevi Pushkin, 1993
- Nymphon angolense Gordon, 1932
- Nymphon apertum Turpaeva, 2004
- Nymphon apheles Child, 1979
- Nymphon apicatum Stock, 1991
- Nymphon arabicum Calman, 1938
- Nymphon arcuatum Child, 1995
- Nymphon aritai Nakamura & Child, 1991
- Nymphon articulare Hodgson, 1908
- Nymphon australe Hodgson, 1902
- Nymphon banzare Gordon, 1944
- Nymphon barnardi Arnaud & Child, 1988
- Nymphon basispinosum Hilton, 1942
- Nymphon benthos Hedgpeth, 1949
- Nymphon bergi Losina-Losinsky, 1961
- Nymphon biarticulatum (Hodgson, 1907)
- Nymphon bicornum Arnaud & Child, 1988
- Nymphon biformidens Stock, 1974
- Nymphon bigibbulare Losina-Losinsky, 1961
- Nymphon biserratum Losina-Losinsky, 1961
- Nymphon boogoora Bamber, 2008
- Nymphon boraborae Muller, 1990
- Nymphon bouvieri Gordon, 1932
- Nymphon brachyrhynchum Hoek, 1881
- Nymphon braschnikowi Schimkewitsch, 1906
- Nymphon brevicaudatum Miers, 1875
- Nymphon brevirostre Hodge, 1863
- Nymphon brevis Nakamura & Child, 1991
- Nymphon brevitarse Krøyer, 1838
- Nymphon bucuspidum Child, 1995
- Nymphon bullatum Stock, 1992
- Nymphon bunyipi Clark, 1963
- Nymphon caementarum Stock, 1975
- Nymphon caldarium Stock, 1987
- Nymphon calypso Fage, 1959
- Nymphon centrum Child, 1997
- Nymphon chaetochir Utinomi, 1971
- Nymphon chainae Child, 1982
- Nymphon charcoti Bouvier, 1911
- Nymphon citerium Nakamura & Child, 1991
- Nymphon clarencei Gordon, 1932
- Nymphon cognatum Loman, 1928
- Nymphon comes Flynn, 1928
- Nymphon compactum Hoek, 1881
- Nymphon conirostrum Stock, 1973
- Nymphon crenatiunguis Barnard, 1946
- Nymphon crosnieri Stock, 1965
- Nymphon curvidens Stock, 1990
- Nymphon dentiferum Child, 1997
- Nymphon diabolum Child, 1988
- Nymphon discorsicoxae Child, 1982
- Nymphon dissimilis Hedgpeth, 1949
- Nymphon distensum Möbius, 1902
- Nymphon draconum Child, 1990
- Nymphon dubitabile Stock, 1973
- Nymphon duospinum Hilton, 1942
- Nymphon elegans Hansen, 1887
- Nymphon elongatum Hilton, 1942
- Nymphon eltaninae Child, 1995
- Nymphon enteonum Child, 2002
- Nymphon falcatum Utinomi, 1955
- Nymphon femorale Fage, 1956
- Nymphon filatovae Turpaeva, 1993
- Nymphon floridanum Hedgpeth, 1948
- Nymphon forceps Nakamura & Child, 1991
- Nymphon foresti Fage, 1953
- Nymphon forticulum Child, 1995
- Nymphon fortunatum Stock, 1997
- Nymphon foxi Calman, 1927
- Nymphon frigidum Hodgson, 1907
- Nymphon galatheae Fage, 1956
- Nymphon gerlachei Giltay, 1935
- Nymphon giltayi Hedgpeth, 1948
- Nymphon giraffa Loman, 1908
- Nymphon glabrum Child, 1995
- Nymphon gracile Leach, 1814
- Nymphon gracilipes Miers, 1875
- Nymphon granulatum Arnaud & Child, 1988
- Nymphon grossipes (Fabricius, 1780)
- Nymphon grus Stock, 1991
- Nymphon gruveli Bouvier, 1910
- Nymphon gruzovi Pushkin, 1993
- Nymphon gunteri Hedgpeth, 1949
- Nymphon hadale Child, 1982
- Nymphon hamatum Hoek, 1881
- Nymphon hampsoni Child, 1982
- Nymphon hedgpethi Stock, 1953
- Nymphon helleri Bohm, 1879
- Nymphon heterodenticulatum Hedgpeth, 1941
- Nymphon heterodentum Turpaeva, 1991
- Nymphon heterospinum Hedgpeth, 1949
- Nymphon hiemale Hodgson, 1907
- Nymphon hirsutum Child, 1995
- Nymphon hirtipes Bell, 1853
- Nymphon hirtum (Fabricius, 1780)
- Nymphon hodgsoni Schimkewitsch, 1913
- Nymphon immane Stock, 1954
- Nymphon improcerum Nakamura & Child, 1991
- Nymphon inaequipes Stock, 1992
- Nymphon inerme Fage, 1956
- Nymphon inferum Child, 1995
- Nymphon infundibulum Nakamura & Child, 1991
- Nymphon inornatum Child, 1995
- Nymphon isaenki Pushkin, 1993
- Nymphon japonicum Ortmann, 1891
- Nymphon kensleyi Child, 1988
- Nymphon kodanii Hedgpeth, 1949
- Nymphon kurilense Losina-Losinsky, 1961
- Nymphon kurilocompactum Turpaeva, 2004
- Nymphon kurilokamchaticum Turpaeva, 1971
- Nymphon lanare Hodgson, 1907
- Nymphon laneum Turpaeva, 2006
- Nymphon laterospinum Stock, 1963
- Nymphon leptocheles Sars, 1888
- Nymphon lituus Child, 1979
- Nymphon lobatum Stock, 1962
- Nymphon lomani Gordon, 1944
- Nymphon longicaudatum Carpenter, 1904
- Nymphon longicollum Hoek, 1881
- Nymphon longicoxa Hoek, 1881
- Nymphon longimanum Sars, 1888
- Nymphon longispinum Nakamura & Child, 1991
- Nymphon longitarse Krøyer, 1844
- Nymphon longituberculatum Olsen, 1913
- Nymphon macabou Muller, 1990
- Nymphon macilentum Stock, 1981
- Nymphon macquariensis Child, 1995
- Nymphon macrochelatum Pushkin, 1993
- Nymphon macronyx Sars, 1877
- Nymphon macrum Wilson, 1880
- Nymphon maculatum Carpenter, 1910
- Nymphon maldivense Clark, 1961
- Nymphon maoriana Clark, 1958
- Nymphon maruyamai Nakamura & Child, 1991
- Nymphon mauritanicum Fage, 1942
- Nymphon megacheles Child, 1988
- Nymphon megalops Sars, 1877
- Nymphon mendosum (Hodgson, 1907)
- Nymphon microctenatum Barnard, 1946
- Nymphon microgracilipes Pushkin, 1993
- Nymphon micronesicum Child, 1982
- Nymphon micronyx Sars, 1888
- Nymphon micropedes Hedgpeth, 1949
- Nymphon microrhynchum G.O. Sars, 1888
- Nymphon microsetosum Hilton, 1942
- Nymphon modestum Stock, 1959
- Nymphon molleri Clark, 1963
- Nymphon molum Hilton, 1942
- Nymphon monothrix Child, 1995
- Nymphon multidens Gordon, 1932
- Nymphon multituberculatum Gordon, 1944
- Nymphon nagannuense Takahashi, Kajihara & Mawatari, 2012
- Nymphon nakamurai Stock, 1994
- Nymphon natalense Flynn, 1928
- Nymphon neelovi Pushkin, 1993
- Nymphon neumayri Gordon, 1932
- Nymphon nipponense Hedgpeth, 1949
- Nymphon novaecaledoniae Stock, 1991
- Nymphon novaehollandiae Clark, 1963
- Nymphon nugax Stock, 1966
- Nymphon obesum Arnaud & Child, 1988
- Nymphon ochoticum Losina-Losinsky, 1961
- Nymphon ohshimai Hedgpeth, 1949
- Nymphon okudai Nakamura & Child, 1991
- Nymphon orcadense (Hodgson, 1908)
- Nymphon ortmanni Helfer, 1938
- Nymphon pagophilum Child, 1995
- Nymphon paralobatum Arnaud & Child, 1988
- Nymphon parasiticum Merton, 1906
- Nymphon parum Stock, 1991
- Nymphon paucidens Gordon, 1932
- Nymphon paucituberculatum Gordon, 1944
- Nymphon pedunculatum Arnaud & Child, 1988
- Nymphon perlucidum Hoek, P.P.C., 1881
- Nymphon petri Turpaeva, 1993
- Nymphon pfefferi Loman, 1923
- Nymphon phasmatodes Bohm, 1879
- Nymphon pilosum Möbius, 1902
- Nymphon pixellae Scott, 1912
- Nymphon plectrum Takahashi, Kajihara & Mawatari, 2012
- Nymphon pleodon Stock, 1962
- Nymphon polyglia Bamber, 2004
- Nymphon premordicum Child, 1995
- Nymphon primacoxa Stock, 1968
- Nymphon proceroides Bouvier, 1913
- Nymphon procerum Hoek, 1881
- Nymphon profundum Hilton, 1942
- Nymphon prolatum Fage, 1942
- Nymphon proximum Calman, 1915
- Nymphon pseudogracilipes Pushkin, 1993
- Nymphon puellula Krapp, 1973
- Nymphon pumillum Nakamura & Child, 1991
- Nymphon punctum Child, 1995
- Nymphon quadriclavus Nakamura & Child, 1991
- Nymphon residuum Stock, 1971
- Nymphon rottnesti Child, 1975
- Nymphon rybakovi Pushkin, 1993
- Nymphon sabellum Child, 1995
- Nymphon sandersi Child, 1982
- Nymphon sarsii Meinert, 1899
- Nymphon schimkewitschi Losina-Losinsky, 1929
- Nymphon schmidti Losina-Losinsky, 1961
- Nymphon scotiae Stock, 1981
- Nymphon serratidentatum Arnaud & Child, 1988
- Nymphon serratum G. O. Sars, 1879
- Nymphon setimanus Barnard, 1946
- Nymphon setipedes Child, 1988
- Nymphon signatum Möbius, 1902
- Nymphon simulare Child, C.A., 1992
- Nymphon simulatum Nakamura & Child, 1991
- Nymphon singulare Stock, 1954
- Nymphon sluiteri Hoek, 1901
- Nymphon soyoi Utinomi, 1955
- Nymphon spinifex Stock, 1997
- Nymphon spiniventris Stock, 1953
- Nymphon stenocheir Norman, 1908
- Nymphon stipulum Child, 1990
- Nymphon stocki Utinomi, 1955
- Nymphon striatum Losina-Losinsky, 1929
- Nymphon stroemi Krøyer, 1844
- Nymphon subtile Loman, 1923
- Nymphon surinamense Stock, 1975
- Nymphon tanypalpes Child, 1988
- Nymphon tenellum (Sars, 1888)
- Nymphon tenuimanum Hodgson, 1915
- Nymphon tenuipes Bouvier, 1911
- Nymphon torulum Child, 1998
- Nymphon tricuspidatum Soler-Membrives & Munilla, 2011
- Nymphon tripectinatum Turpaeva, 1971
- Nymphon trispinum Child, 1998
- Nymphon trituberculum Child, 1995
- Nymphon tuberculare Losina-Losinsky, 1961
- Nymphon tubiferum Stock, 1978
- Nymphon typhlops Hodgson, 1915
- Nymphon uncatum Child, 1998
- Nymphon unguiculatum Hodgson, 1915
- Nymphon uniunguiculatum Losina-Losinsky, 1933
- Nymphon vacans Child, 1997
- Nymphon villosum Hodgson, 1907
- Nymphon vulcanellum Stock, 1992
- Nymphon vulsum Stock, 1986
- Nymphon walvisense Stock, 1981
- Nymphon zundianum Pushkin, 1993
