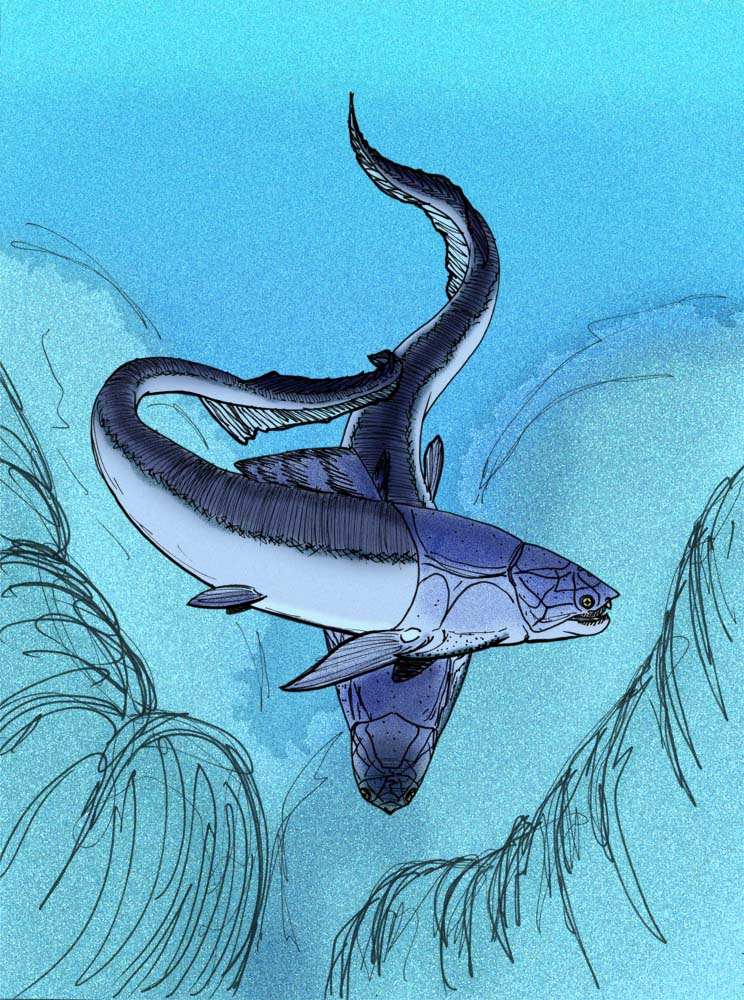
- Artist's reconstruction

Scientific classification
- Kingdom: Animalia
- Phylum: Chordata
- Class: †Placodermi
- Order: †Arthrodira
- Suborder: †Brachythoraci
- Family: †Dunkleosteidae
- Genus: †Xiangshuiosteus; Wang, 1992

Type species
- Xiangshuiosteus wui Wang, 1992

= Xiangshuiosteus =

Xiangshuiosteus Temporal range: Early Devonian: Late Emsian, 393.3 Ma

Extinct genus of fishes

Xiangshuiosteus wui is an extinct monospecific genus of brachythoracid arthrodire placoderm from the Late Emsian stage of the Early Devonian epoch, discovered in Wuding County of Yunnan province, China. It has recently been reassessed as a dunkleosteid.

== Etymology ==
The generic name literally translates as "perfume (Chinese: 香水; pinyin: xiāngshuǐ) + bone," but actually refers to Xiangshui Valley, (Note: Not to be confused with Xiangshui County (Chinese: 响水县; pinyin: Xiǎngshuǐ Xiàn; lit. 'noisy water') in Jiangsu province) the district in Wuding County where the holotype was found. The specific name honors Wu Baosheng, the gentleman who provided the holotype to Wang Junqing, the species' describer.

== Specimen and taxonomy ==
X. wui is known from a flattened, "Buddhist cap" shaped skull roof. The skull roof is strongly reminiscent of those of coccosteids, but also has anatomical features otherwise diagnostic of buchanosteids. This mix of anatomy lead its describer, Wang Junqing, to suggest that X. wui is the sister taxon of Coccosteidae, and represents a transitional form between Coccosteidae and Buchanosteidae.

A 2013 reappraisal of Kiangyousteus and several other eubrachythoracid arthrodire genera by You-An Zhu and Min Zhu lead to the conclusion that X. wui not only does not represent a transitional form between coccosteids and buchanosteids, but is actually a dunkleosteid closely related to the Gogo Reef Eastmanosteus calliaspis (which is, in turn, implied to be not of the genus Eastmanosteus). The cladogram below from the 2013 Zhu & Zhu study shows the placement of Xiangshuiosteus within Dunkleosteidae.

- Eubrachythoraci
  - - Coccosteomorphi
      - Coccosteus cuspidatus
      - - Harrytoombsia elegans
        - - Mcnamaraspis kaprios
          - Incisoscutoidea
            - Compagopiscis croucheri
            - - Incisoscutum ritchiei
              - Incisoscutum sarahae
            - Camuropiscidae
              - Latocamurus coulthardi
              - Camuropiscis laidlawi
              - - Rolfosteus canningensis
                - Tubonasus lennardensis
                - Fallacosteus turneri
    - Aspinothoracidi
      - Dinichthys herzeri
      - - Hadrosteus rapax
        - - Gorgonichthys clarki
          - - Heintzichthys gouldii
            - Selenosteidae
              - Stenosteus angustopectus
              - - Gymnotrachelus hydei
                - - Rhinosteus parvulus
                  - Pachyosteus bulla
  - Dunkleosteoidea
    - Westralichthys uwagedensis
    - - - Protitanichthys rockportensis
        - Panxiosteidae
          - Panxiosteus ocullus
          - Janiosteus timanicus
          - Plourdosteus canadensis
      - Dunkleosteidae
        - - Eastmanosteus calliaspis
          - Xiangshuiosteus wui
        - - Eastmanosteus pustulosus
          - Kiangyousteus yohii
          - Golshanichthys asiatica
          - - Dunkleosteus amblyodoratus
            - Dunkleosteus terrelli
            - Dunkleosteus raveri

However, the subsequent 2016 Zhu et al. study using a larger morphological dataset recovered Xiangshuiosteus well outside of Dunkleosteoidea and even Eubrachythoraci, more in-line with Wang's original 1992 phylogenetic assessment of Xiangshuiosteus, as shown in the cladogram below:

- Phlyctaenioidei
  - Elvaspis tuberculata
  - Dicksonosteus arcticus
  - Turrisaspis elektor
  - Groenlandaspis antarcticus
  - Holonema westolli
  - Brachythoraci
    - Homostiidae
      - Homostius sulcatus
      - Antineosteus lehmani
    - - Buchanosteoidea
        - Buchanosteus confertituberculatus
        - Goodradigbeeon australianum
        - Parabuchanosteus murrumbidgeeni
      - - Dhanguura johnstoni
        - - Gemuendenaspis angusta
          - - Xiangshuiosteus wui
            - Eubrachythoraci
              - Coccosteomorphi
                - Coccosteoidea
                  - Coccosteidae
                    - - Millerosteus minor
                      - Coccosteus cuspidatus
                    - - Dickosteus threiplandi
                      - Watsonosteus fletti
                      - Protitanichthys rockportensis
                  - Panxiosteidae
                    - Plourdosteus canadensis
                    - Panxiosteus ocullus
                    - Janiosteus timanicus
                - Incisoscutoidea
                  - Harrytoombsia elegans
                  - - Torosteus tuberculatus
                    - Torosteus pulchellus
                  - - Mcnamaraspis kaprios
                    - - Compagopiscis croucheri
                      - Trematosteus fontanellus
                      - Camuropiscidae
                        - - Incisoscutum ritchiei
                          - Incisoscutum sarahae
                        - - Rolfosteus canningensis
                          - - Tubonasus lennardensis
                            - - Fallacosteus turneri
                              - - Camuropiscis laidlawi
                                - Latocamurus coulthardi
              - Pachyosteomorphi
                - Rhachiosteus pterygiatus
                - - Dunkleosteoidea
                    - Eastmanosteus calliaspis
                    - - - Eastmanosteus pustulosus
                        - Kiangyousteus yohii
                      - - Golshanichthys asiatica
                        - - Westralichthys uwagedensis
                          - - - Dunkleosteus raveri
                              - Dunkleosteus terrelli
                            - - Dunkleosteus amblyodoratus
                              - Heterostiidae
                                - Heterosteus ingens
                                - Yinosteus major
                  - Aspinothoracidi
                    - Tapinosteus heintzi
                    - - - Bullerichthys fascidens
                        - - Kendrickichthys cavernosus
                          - Bruntonichthys multidens
                      - - Dinichthys herzeri
                        - - Hadrosteus rapax
                          - - Gorgonichthys clarki
                            - Selenosteidae
                              - Heintzichthys gouldii
                              - Pachyosteus bulla
                              - Gymnotrachelus hydei
                              - Stenosteus angustopectus
                              - Brachyosteus dietrichi
                              - - Melanosteus occitanus
                                - Rhinosteus parvulus

== See also ==
- Jiuchengia a coccosteid found in the same formation.
