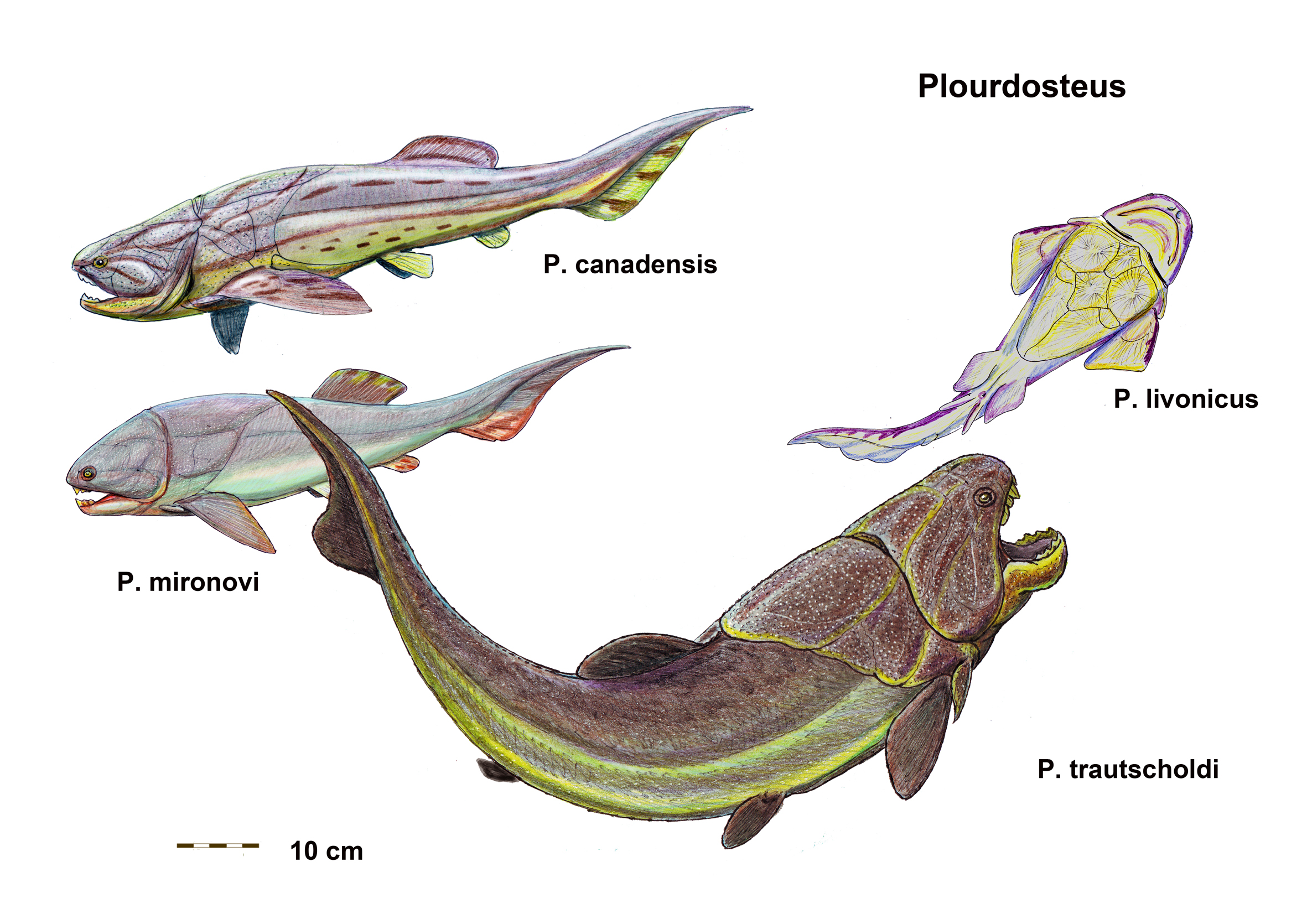
- Various species of Plourdosteus, from Late Devonian of Canada, Russia and Baltic countries

Scientific classification
- Kingdom: Animalia
- Phylum: Chordata
- Class: †Placodermi
- Order: †Arthrodira
- Suborder: †Brachythoraci
- Family: †Panxiosteidae
- Genus: †Plourdosteus; Ørvig, 1951

Species
- Plourdosteus canadensis (Woodward, 1892); Plourdosteus livonicus (Eastman, 1896); Plourdosteus mironovi (Obruchev, 1933); Plourdosteus trautscholdi (Eastman, 1897)

= Plourdosteus =

Plourdosteus Temporal range: Devonian: Givetian–Frasnian, 391.8–374.5 Ma

Extinct genus of fishes

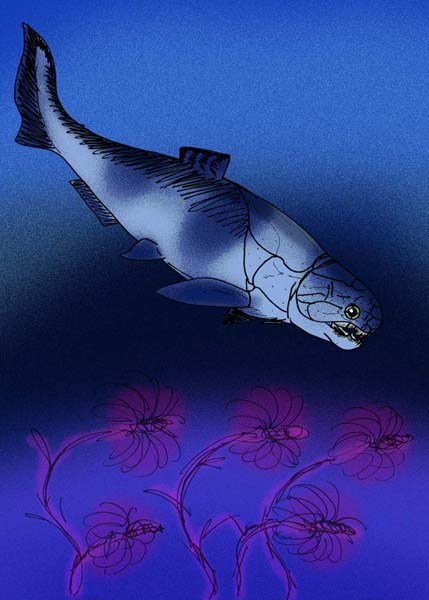
Artist's reconstruction of Plourdosteus trautscholdi

Plourdosteus is an extinct genus of placoderm arthrodire which was relatively widespread in Euramerica during the Givetian to Frasnian ages of the Devonian. It was a small placoderm, with P. canadensis specimen MNHM 2-177 measuring 37.5 cm (14.8 in) long.

== Etymology ==
The name Plourdosteus commemorates the Plourde family at Miguasha National Park.

== Taxonomy ==
Plourdosteus was previously assigned to the family Plourdosteidae within the Coccosteomorphi. However, subsequent studies found the family Plourdosteidae to be polyphyletic and should be dismissed. Plourdosteus was then proposed to be a member of Panxiosteidae. In the 2010 Carr & Hlavin phylogenetic study, Panxiosteidae was recognized as the sister taxon to the family Dunkleosteidae, which together comprised the superfamily Dunkleosteoidea (one of the three major clades of Eubrachythoraci).

The phylogeny of Plourdosteus within Panxiosteidae is shown in the cladogram below from the 2013 Zhu & Zhu study:

- Eubrachythoraci
  - - Coccosteomorphi
      - Coccosteus cuspidatus
      - - Harrytoombsia elegans
        - - Mcnamaraspis kaprios
          - Incisoscutoidea
            - Compagopiscis croucheri
            - - Incisoscutum ritchiei
              - Incisoscutum sarahae
            - Camuropiscidae
              - Latocamurus coulthardi
              - Camuropiscis laidlawi
              - - Rolfosteus canningensis
                - Tubonasus lennardensis
                - Fallacosteus turneri
    - Aspinothoracidi
      - Dinichthys herzeri
      - - Hadrosteus rapax
        - - Gorgonichthys clarki
          - - Heintzichthys gouldii
            - Selenosteidae
              - Stenosteus angustopectus
              - - Gymnotrachelus hydei
                - - Rhinosteus parvulus
                  - Pachyosteus bulla
  - Dunkleosteoidea
    - Westralichthys uwagedensis
    - - - Protitanichthys rockportensis
        - Panxiosteidae
          - Panxiosteus ocullus
          - Janiosteus timanicus
          - Plourdosteus canadensis
      - Dunkleosteidae
        - - Eastmanosteus calliaspis
          - Xiangshuiosteus wui
        - - Eastmanosteus pustulosus
          - Kiangyousteus yohii
          - Golshanichthys asiatica
          - - Dunkleosteus amblyodoratus
            - Dunkleosteus terrelli
            - Dunkleosteus raveri

However, the subsequent 2016 Zhu et al. study using a larger morphological dataset recovered Panxiosteidae well outside of Dunkleosteoidea, instead within Coccosteomorphi and then Coccosteoidea as the sister group of Coccosteidae, as shown in the cladogram below:

- Eubrachythoraci
  - Coccosteomorphi
    - Coccosteoidea
      - Coccosteidae
        - - Millerosteus minor
          - Coccosteus cuspidatus
        - - Dickosteus threiplandi
          - Watsonosteus fletti
          - Protitanichthys rockportensis
      - Panxiosteidae
        - Plourdosteus canadensis
        - Panxiosteus ocullus
        - Janiosteus timanicus
    - Incisoscutoidea
      - Harrytoombsia elegans
      - - Torosteus tuberculatus
        - Torosteus pulchellus
      - - Mcnamaraspis kaprios
        - - Compagopiscis croucheri
          - Trematosteus fontanellus
          - Camuropiscidae
            - - Incisoscutum ritchiei
              - Incisoscutum sarahae
            - - Rolfosteus canningensis
              - - Tubonasus lennardensis
                - - Fallacosteus turneri
                  - - Camuropiscis laidlawi
                    - Latocamurus coulthardi
  - Pachyosteomorphi
    - Rhachiosteus pterygiatus
    - - Dunkleosteoidea
        - Eastmanosteus calliaspis
        - - - Eastmanosteus pustulosus
            - Kiangyousteus yohii
          - - Golshanichthys asiatica
            - - Westralichthys uwagedensis
              - - - Dunkleosteus raveri
                  - Dunkleosteus terrelli
                - - Dunkleosteus amblyodoratus
                  - Heterostiidae
                    - Heterosteus ingens
                    - Yinosteus major
      - Aspinothoracidi
        - Tapinosteus heintzi
        - - - Bullerichthys fascidens
            - - Kendrickichthys cavernosus
              - Bruntonichthys multidens
          - - Dinichthys herzeri
            - - Hadrosteus rapax
              - - Gorgonichthys clarki
                - Selenosteidae
                  - Heintzichthys gouldii
                  - Pachyosteus bulla
                  - Gymnotrachelus hydei
                  - Stenosteus angustopectus
                  - Brachyosteus dietrichi
                  - - Melanosteus occitanus
                    - Rhinosteus parvulus
