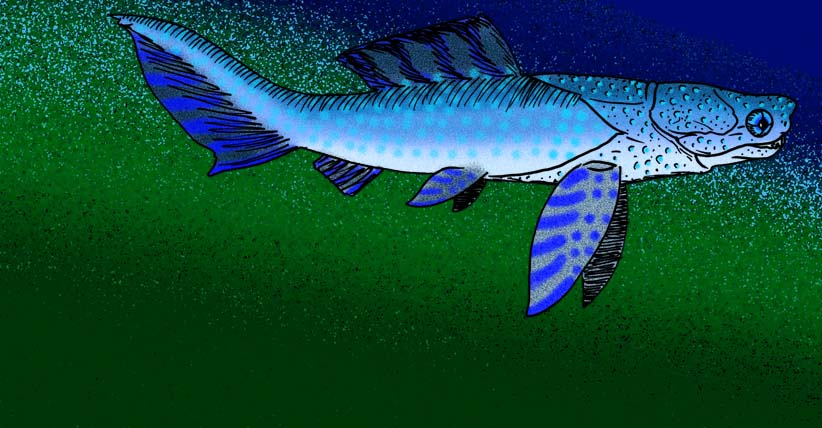

Scientific classification
- Kingdom: Animalia
- Phylum: Chordata
- Class: †Placodermi
- Order: †Arthrodira
- Suborder: †Brachythoraci
- Family: †Camuropiscidae
- Genus: †Simosteus; Dennis & Miles, 1982
- Species: †S. tuberculatus

Binomial name
- †Simosteus tuberculatus Dennis & Miles, 1982

= Simosteus =

Simosteus Temporal range: Frasnian

Simosteus tuberculatus is a small arthrodire placoderm from the Gogo Formation of Western Australia. Unlike other members of the arthrodire family Camuropiscidae, S. tuberculatus had a short, snub-nose, as directly implied by the translation of its generic name, "snub-nosed bone." Although S. tuberculatus lacks the characteristic elongated nose, it shares other diagnostic features of camuropiscids, such as cheekplates sutured to the cranium.

So far, the only specimen known is of an incomplete cranium.
