= Panxiosteus =

Panxiosteus Temporal range: Middle Devonian: Givetian, 387.7–382.7 Ma

Scientific classification
- Kingdom: Animalia
- Phylum: Chordata
- Class: †Placodermi
- Order: †Arthrodira
- Suborder: †Brachythoraci
- Family: †Panxiosteidae
- Genus: †Panxiosteus; Wang, 1979

Type species
- Panxiosteus oculus Wang, 1979

Extinct genus of fishes

Panxiosteus is an extinct monospecific genus of placoderm arthrodire from the Middle Devonian: Givetian stage of Yunnan province, China.

== Phylogeny ==
Panxiosteus is a member of Panxiosteidae. In the 2010 Carr & Hlavin phylogenetic study, Panxiosteidae was recognized as the sister taxon to the family Dunkleosteidae, which together comprised the superfamily Dunkleosteoidea (one of the three major clades of Eubrachythoraci). The phylogeny of Panxiosteus within Panxiosteidae is shown in the cladogram below from the 2013 Zhu & Zhu study:

- Eubrachythoraci
  - - Coccosteomorphi
      - Coccosteus cuspidatus
      - - Harrytoombsia elegans
        - - Mcnamaraspis kaprios
          - Incisoscutoidea
            - Compagopiscis croucheri
            - - Incisoscutum ritchiei
              - Incisoscutum sarahae
            - Camuropiscidae
              - Latocamurus coulthardi
              - Camuropiscis laidlawi
              - - Rolfosteus canningensis
                - Tubonasus lennardensis
                - Fallacosteus turneri
    - Aspinothoracidi
      - Dinichthys herzeri
      - - Hadrosteus rapax
        - - Gorgonichthys clarki
          - - Heintzichthys gouldii
            - Selenosteidae
              - Stenosteus angustopectus
              - - Gymnotrachelus hydei
                - - Rhinosteus parvulus
                  - Pachyosteus bulla
  - Dunkleosteoidea
    - Westralichthys uwagedensis
    - - - Protitanichthys rockportensis
        - Panxiosteidae
          - Panxiosteus ocullus
          - Janiosteus timanicus
          - Plourdosteus canadensis
      - Dunkleosteidae
        - - Eastmanosteus calliaspis
          - Xiangshuiosteus wui
        - - Eastmanosteus pustulosus
          - Kiangyousteus yohii
          - Golshanichthys asiatica
          - - Dunkleosteus amblyodoratus
            - Dunkleosteus terrelli
            - Dunkleosteus raveri

However, the subsequent 2016 Zhu et al. study using a larger morphological dataset recovered Panxiosteidae well outside of Dunkleosteoidea, instead within Coccosteomorphi and then Coccosteoidea as the sister group of Coccosteidae, as shown in the cladogram below:

- Eubrachythoraci
  - Coccosteomorphi
    - Coccosteoidea
      - Coccosteidae
        - - Millerosteus minor
          - Coccosteus cuspidatus
        - - Dickosteus threiplandi
          - Watsonosteus fletti
          - Protitanichthys rockportensis
      - Panxiosteidae
        - Plourdosteus canadensis
        - Panxiosteus ocullus
        - Janiosteus timanicus
    - Incisoscutoidea
      - Harrytoombsia elegans
      - - Torosteus tuberculatus
        - Torosteus pulchellus
      - - Mcnamaraspis kaprios
        - - Compagopiscis croucheri
          - Trematosteus fontanellus
          - Camuropiscidae
            - - Incisoscutum ritchiei
              - Incisoscutum sarahae
            - - Rolfosteus canningensis
              - - Tubonasus lennardensis
                - - Fallacosteus turneri
                  - - Camuropiscis laidlawi
                    - Latocamurus coulthardi
  - Pachyosteomorphi
    - Rhachiosteus pterygiatus
    - - Dunkleosteoidea
        - Eastmanosteus calliaspis
        - - - Eastmanosteus pustulosus
            - Kiangyousteus yohii
          - - Golshanichthys asiatica
            - - Westralichthys uwagedensis
              - - - Dunkleosteus raveri
                  - Dunkleosteus terrelli
                - - Dunkleosteus amblyodoratus
                  - Heterostiidae
                    - Heterosteus ingens
                    - Yinosteus major
      - Aspinothoracidi
        - Tapinosteus heintzi
        - - - Bullerichthys fascidens
            - - Kendrickichthys cavernosus
              - Bruntonichthys multidens
          - - Dinichthys herzeri
            - - Hadrosteus rapax
              - - Gorgonichthys clarki
                - Selenosteidae
                  - Heintzichthys gouldii
                  - Pachyosteus bulla
                  - Gymnotrachelus hydei
                  - Stenosteus angustopectus
                  - Brachyosteus dietrichi
                  - - Melanosteus occitanus
                    - Rhinosteus parvulus
