= Torosteus =

Torosteus Temporal range: Late Devonian: Frasnian, 382.7–372.2 Ma

Scientific classification
- Kingdom: Animalia
- Phylum: Chordata
- Class: †Placodermi
- Order: †Arthrodira
- Suborder: †Brachythoraci
- Clade: †Eubrachythoraci
- Clade: †Coccosteomorphi
- Superfamily: †Incisoscutoidea
- Genus: †Torosteus; Gardiner & Miles, 1990

Species
- Torosteus pulchellus Gardiner & Miles, 1990; Torosteus tuberculatus Gardiner & Miles, 1990

Extinct genus of fishes

Torosteus is an extinct genus of arthrodire placoderm from the Early Frasnian stage of the Late Devonian period. Fossils are found in the Kimberley region of Australia.

== Description ==
Torosteus's body size and morphology are similar to Incisoscutum and Compagopiscis, suggesting a possible pelagic lifestyle, although they were on different trophic levels of their ecosystem. Bite force analysis has suggested that it was an active predator, and fossils have been found in numbers, suggesting possible schooling behavior.

== Phylogeny ==
Torosteus was originally classified as a member of the family Plourdosteidae. However, phylogenetic analysis later found Plourdosteidae to be an invalid grouping, and the family was dismissed. Torosteus is now considered to be a member of the superfamily Incisoscutoidea, which belongs to the clade Coccosteomorphi, one of the two major clades within Eubrachythoraci. The cladogram below shows the phylogeny of Torosteus:

- Eubrachythoraci
  - Coccosteomorphi
    - Coccosteoidea
      - Coccosteidae
        - - Millerosteus minor
          - Coccosteus cuspidatus
        - - Dickosteus threiplandi
          - Watsonosteus fletti
          - Protitanichthys rockportensis
      - Panxiosteidae
        - Plourdosteus canadensis
        - Panxiosteus ocullus
        - Janiosteus timanicus
    - Incisoscutoidea
      - Harrytoombsia elegans
      - - Torosteus tuberculatus
        - Torosteus pulchellus
      - - Mcnamaraspis kaprios
        - - Compagopiscis croucheri
          - Trematosteus fontanellus
          - Camuropiscidae
            - - Incisoscutum ritchiei
              - Incisoscutum sarahae
            - - Rolfosteus canningensis
              - - Tubonasus lennardensis
                - - Fallacosteus turneri
                  - - Camuropiscis laidlawi
                    - Latocamurus coulthardi
  - Pachyosteomorphi
