= Dickosteus =

Dickosteus Temporal range: Middle Devonian: Late Eifelian to Early Givetian, 393.3–382.7 Ma

Scientific classification
- Kingdom: Animalia
- Phylum: Chordata
- Class: †Placodermi
- Order: †Arthrodira
- Suborder: †Brachythoraci
- Family: †Coccosteidae
- Genus: †Dickosteus; Miles & Westoll, 1963

Species
- Dickosteus threiplandi Miles & Westoll, 1963 (type)

Extinct genus of fishes

Dickosteus is an extinct genus of coccosteid arthrodire placoderm from the Late Eifelian to Early Givetian stages of the Middle Devonian period. Fossils are found in Orkney and Caithness, Scotland. It was a small placoderm with a total body length of 43.7 cm (17.2 in). It is one of the few placoderms for which complete bodies are known.

== Phylogeny ==
Dickosteus is a member of the family Coccosteidae, which belongs to the clade Coccosteomorphi, one of the two major clades within Eubrachythoraci. The cladogram below shows the phylogeny of Dickosteus:

- Eubrachythoraci
  - Coccosteomorphi
    - Coccosteoidea
      - Coccosteidae
        - - Millerosteus minor
          - Coccosteus cuspidatus
        - - Dickosteus threiplandi
          - Watsonosteus fletti
          - Protitanichthys rockportensis
      - Panxiosteidae
        - Plourdosteus canadensis
        - Panxiosteus ocullus
        - Janiosteus timanicus
    - Incisoscutoidea
      - Harrytoombsia elegans
      - - Torosteus tuberculatus
        - Torosteus pulchellus
      - - Mcnamaraspis kaprios
        - - Compagopiscis croucheri
          - Trematosteus fontanellus
          - Camuropiscidae
            - - Incisoscutum ritchiei
              - Incisoscutum sarahae
            - - Rolfosteus canningensis
              - - Tubonasus lennardensis
                - - Fallacosteus turneri
                  - - Camuropiscis laidlawi
                    - Latocamurus coulthardi
  - Pachyosteomorphi
