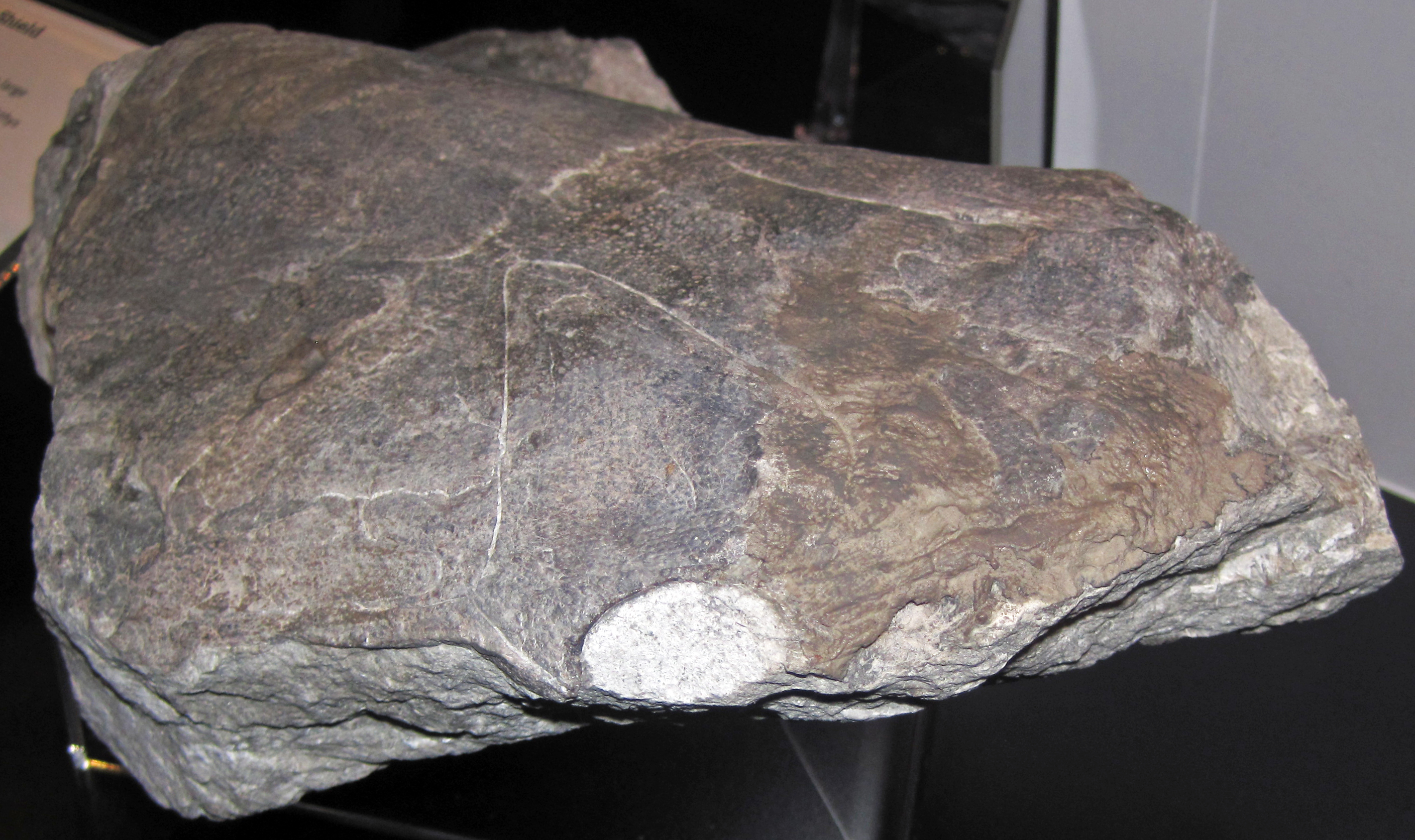
- Head shield, Ohio Geological Survey

Scientific classification
- Kingdom: Animalia
- Phylum: Chordata
- Class: †Placodermi
- Order: †Arthrodira
- Suborder: †Brachythoraci
- Family: †Coccosteidae
- Genus: †Protitanichthys; Eastman, 1907

Species
- Protitanichthys fossatus Eastman, 1907 (type); Protitanichthys rockportensis Case, 1931

Synonyms
- Dinichthys ohioensis Skeels, 1962

= Protitanichthys =

Protitanichthys Temporal range: Middle Devonian: Eifelian - Lower Givetian, 393.3–382.7 Ma

Extinct genus of fishes

Protitanichthys is an extinct genus of comparatively large coccosteid arthrodire placoderms from the Middle Devonian of the eastern United States. Fossils are found primarily in the Eifelian-epoch aged Delaware Limestone of Ohio, and the Lower Givetian-aged Rockport Quarry Limestone of Michigan

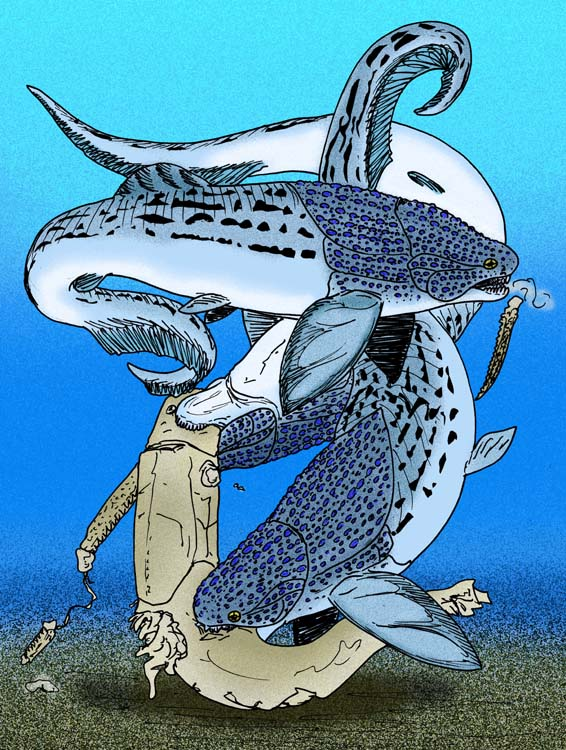
Restoration of P. fossatus

== Description ==
Protitanichthys is very similar to other coccosteids, though the skull is proportionally narrower, and the orbits are comparatively smaller. As mentioned earlier, species are quite large for coccosteids, with most fossil specimens coming from individuals 0.5 metres (1.6 ft; 50 cm) in length, with rare fossils from over 2 metres (6.6 ft; 200 cm) individuals. It is surpassed only in size by the Old World genus, Livosteus.

== Phylogeny ==
Protitanichthys is a member of the family Coccosteidae, which belongs to the clade Coccosteomorphi, one of the two major clades within Eubrachythoraci. The cladogram below shows the phylogeny of Protitanichthys:

- Eubrachythoraci
  - Coccosteomorphi
    - Coccosteoidea
      - Coccosteidae
        - - Millerosteus minor
          - Coccosteus cuspidatus
        - - Dickosteus threiplandi
          - Watsonosteus fletti
          - Protitanichthys rockportensis
      - Panxiosteidae
        - Plourdosteus canadensis
        - Panxiosteus ocullus
        - Janiosteus timanicus
    - Incisoscutoidea
      - Harrytoombsia elegans
      - - Torosteus tuberculatus
        - Torosteus pulchellus
      - - Mcnamaraspis kaprios
        - - Compagopiscis croucheri
          - Trematosteus fontanellus
          - Camuropiscidae
            - - Incisoscutum ritchiei
              - Incisoscutum sarahae
            - - Rolfosteus canningensis
              - - Tubonasus lennardensis
                - - Fallacosteus turneri
                  - - Camuropiscis laidlawi
                    - Latocamurus coulthardi
  - Pachyosteomorphi

== Species ==
=== Protitanichthys fossatus ===
The type species of the genus. The description of P. fossatus is based on a cranial roof, possibly 20 cm (7.9 in) long, found in the Eifelian-aged Delaware Limestone of Ohio.

=== Protitanichthys rockportensis ===
As the specific name suggests, numerous scrappy remains of this species are found in the Lower-Givetian Rockport Quarry Limestone in Michigan. Denison (1978) questions the status of P. rockportensis being distinct from P. fossatus, as there are very few differences between the two, aside from chronological and geographical differences.
