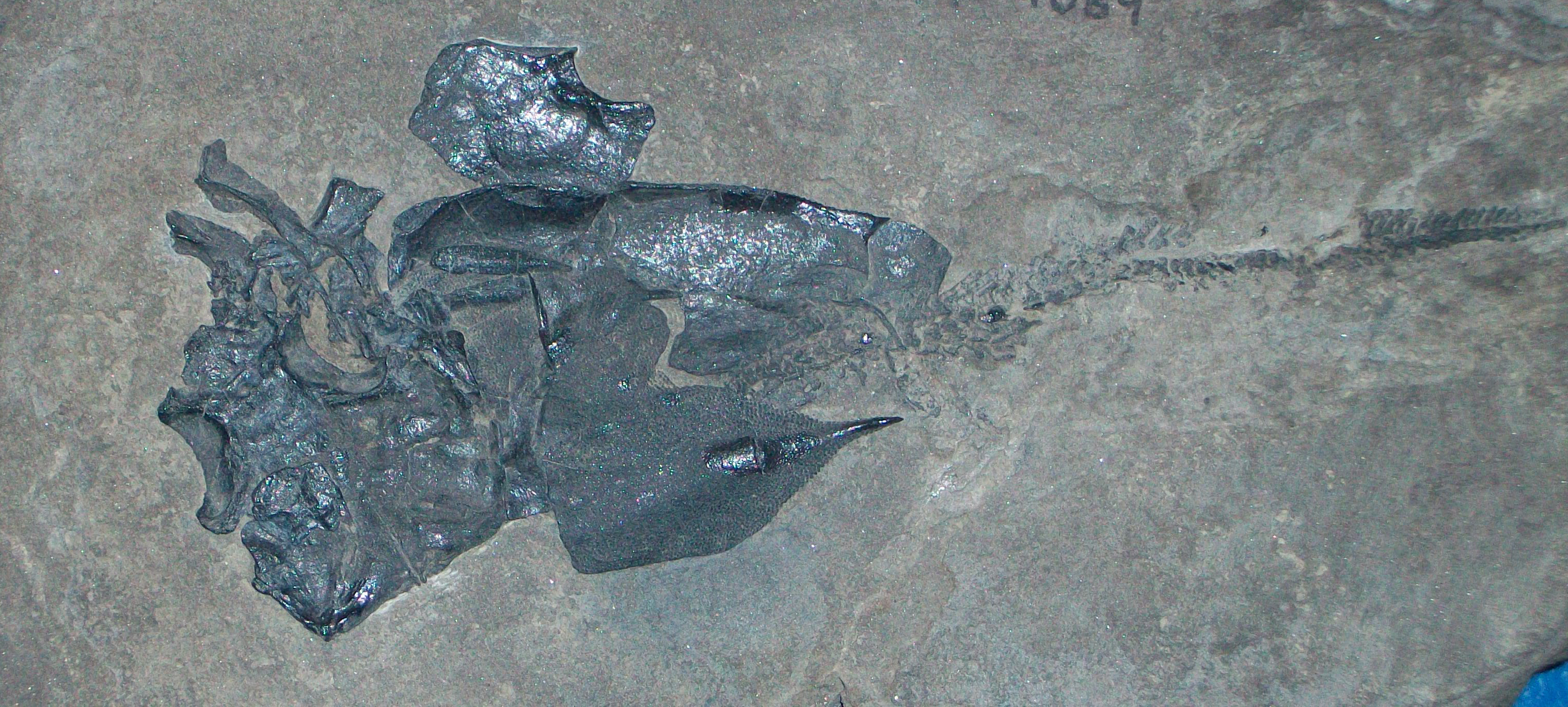
- Fossil of Millerosteus minor in the Field Museum of Natural History.

Scientific classification
- Kingdom: Animalia
- Phylum: Chordata
- Class: †Placodermi
- Order: †Arthrodira
- Suborder: †Brachythoraci
- Family: †Coccosteidae
- Genus: †Millerosteus; Stensiö, 1959

Species
- Millerosteus minor (Miller, 1858) (type)

= Millerosteus =

Millerosteus Temporal range: Middle Devonian: Early Givetian, 387.7–382.7 Ma

Extinct genus of placoderm fish of the Devonian period

Millerosteus is an extinct genus of coccosteid arthrodire placoderm from the Early Givetian stage of the Middle Devonian period. Fossils are found in Orkney and Caithness, Scotland. It was a small placoderm with a body length of 14 cm (5.5 in). Millerosteus is one of the few arthrodires known from specimens preserving the entire skeleton.

== Phylogeny ==
Millerosteus is a member of the family Coccosteidae, which belongs to the clade Coccosteomorphi, one of the two major clades within Eubrachythoraci. The cladogram below shows the phylogeny of Millerosteus:

- Eubrachythoraci
  - Coccosteomorphi
    - Coccosteoidea
      - Coccosteidae
        - - Millerosteus minor
          - Coccosteus cuspidatus
        - - Dickosteus threiplandi
          - Watsonosteus fletti
          - Protitanichthys rockportensis
      - Panxiosteidae
        - Plourdosteus canadensis
        - Panxiosteus ocullus
        - Janiosteus timanicus
    - Incisoscutoidea
      - Harrytoombsia elegans
      - - Torosteus tuberculatus
        - Torosteus pulchellus
      - - Mcnamaraspis kaprios
        - - Compagopiscis croucheri
          - Trematosteus fontanellus
          - Camuropiscidae
            - - Incisoscutum ritchiei
              - Incisoscutum sarahae
            - - Rolfosteus canningensis
              - - Tubonasus lennardensis
                - - Fallacosteus turneri
                  - - Camuropiscis laidlawi
                    - Latocamurus coulthardi
  - Pachyosteomorphi
