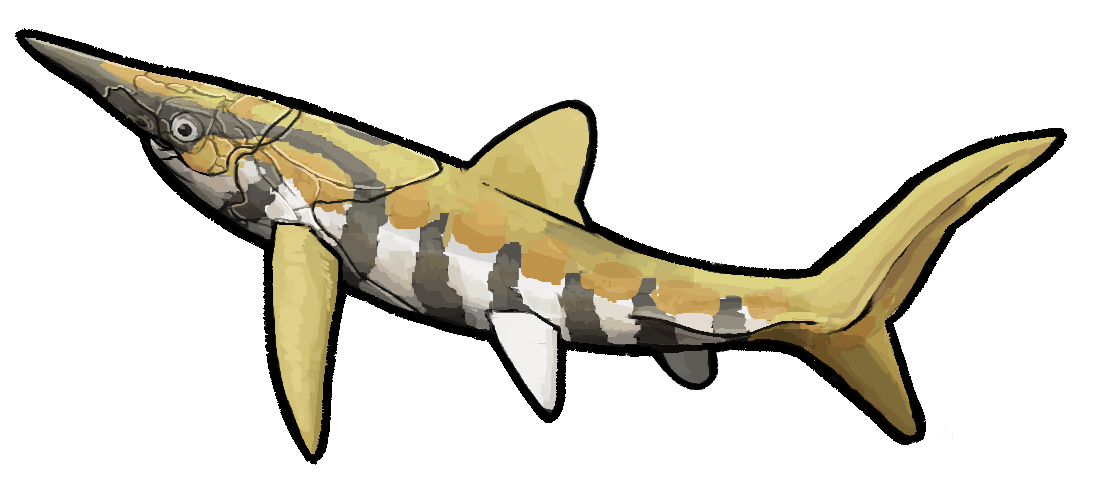

Scientific classification
- Kingdom: Animalia
- Phylum: Chordata
- Class: †Placodermi
- Order: †Arthrodira
- Suborder: †Brachythoraci
- Family: †Camuropiscidae
- Genus: †Rolfosteus; Dennis and Miles, 1979

Species
- Rolfosteus canningensis Dennis and Miles, 1979

= Rolfosteus =

Rolfosteus Temporal range: Late Devonian: Frasnian, 382.7–372.2 Ma

Genus of fishes (fossil)

Rolfosteus is an extinct monospecific genus of arthrodire placoderm from the Early Frasnian stage of the Late Devonian period, found at the Gogo Formation of Western Australia.

== Description ==
Rolfosteus had a skull reaching 11.5 centimetres (4.5 in), with tough plating on the front of its body. Like other arthrodires, such as Coccosteus and the giant Dunkleosteus, it had sharp, bony plates on its mouth which formed a turtle-like beak for cutting prey to pieces. Rolfosteus's most unusual feature was its highly elongated rostrum (snout), which may have been used to enhance its sense of smell as well as increase its hydrodynamic streamlining, making it well adapted to be a pelagic pursuit predator. Its fast jaw movement and jaw morphology allowed it to effectively capture prey and swallow them whole.

== Phylogeny ==
Rolfosteus is a member of the family Camuropiscidae under the superfamily Incisoscutoidea, which belongs to the clade Coccosteomorphi, one of the two major clades within Eubrachythoraci. The cladogram below shows the phylogeny of Rolfosteus:

- Eubrachythoraci
  - Coccosteomorphi
    - Coccosteoidea
      - Coccosteidae
        - - Millerosteus minor
          - Coccosteus cuspidatus
        - - Dickosteus threiplandi
          - Watsonosteus fletti
          - Protitanichthys rockportensis
      - Panxiosteidae
        - Plourdosteus canadensis
        - Panxiosteus ocullus
        - Janiosteus timanicus
    - Incisoscutoidea
      - Harrytoombsia elegans
      - - Torosteus tuberculatus
        - Torosteus pulchellus
      - - Mcnamaraspis kaprios
        - - Compagopiscis croucheri
          - Trematosteus fontanellus
          - Camuropiscidae
            - - Incisoscutum ritchiei
              - Incisoscutum sarahae
            - - Rolfosteus canningensis
              - - Tubonasus lennardensis
                - - Fallacosteus turneri
                  - - Camuropiscis laidlawi
                    - Latocamurus coulthardi
  - Pachyosteomorphi
