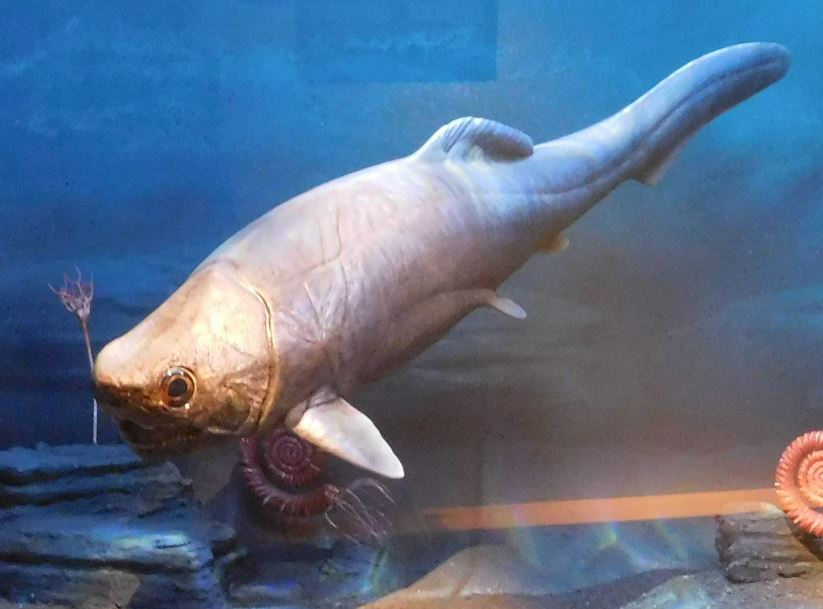
- Model at the Naturhistoriska Riksmuseet in Stockholm

Scientific classification
- Kingdom: Animalia
- Phylum: Chordata
- Class: †Placodermi
- Order: †Arthrodira
- Suborder: †Brachythoraci
- Clade: †Eubrachythoraci
- Clade: †Coccosteomorphi
- Superfamily: †Incisoscutoidea
- Genus: †Harrytoombsia; Miles and Dennis, 1979

Species
- Harrytoombsia elegans Miles and Dennis, 1979 (type)

= Harrytoombsia =

Harrytoombsia Temporal range: Late Devonian: Frasnian, 382.7–372.2 Ma

Extinct genus of arthrodire placoderm

Harrytoombsia is an extinct genus of arthrodire placoderm from the Early Frasnian stage of the Late Devonian period. Fossils are found from Kimberley, Australia. It was a fast-swimming predator, and it had sharp blades of enamel-like material around the outer edge of the jaw for catching prey.

== Phylogeny ==
Harrytoombsia is a member of the superfamily Incisoscutoidea, which belongs to the clade Coccosteomorphi, one of the two major clades within Eubrachythoraci. The cladogram below shows the phylogeny of Harrytoombsia:

- Eubrachythoraci
  - Coccosteomorphi
    - Coccosteoidea
      - Coccosteidae
        - - Millerosteus minor
          - Coccosteus cuspidatus
        - - Dickosteus threiplandi
          - Watsonosteus fletti
          - Protitanichthys rockportensis
      - Panxiosteidae
        - Plourdosteus canadensis
        - Panxiosteus ocullus
        - Janiosteus timanicus
    - Incisoscutoidea
      - Harrytoombsia elegans
      - - Torosteus tuberculatus
        - Torosteus pulchellus
      - - Mcnamaraspis kaprios
        - - Compagopiscis croucheri
          - Trematosteus fontanellus
          - Camuropiscidae
            - - Incisoscutum ritchiei
              - Incisoscutum sarahae
            - - Rolfosteus canningensis
              - - Tubonasus lennardensis
                - - Fallacosteus turneri
                  - - Camuropiscis laidlawi
                    - Latocamurus coulthardi
  - Pachyosteomorphi
