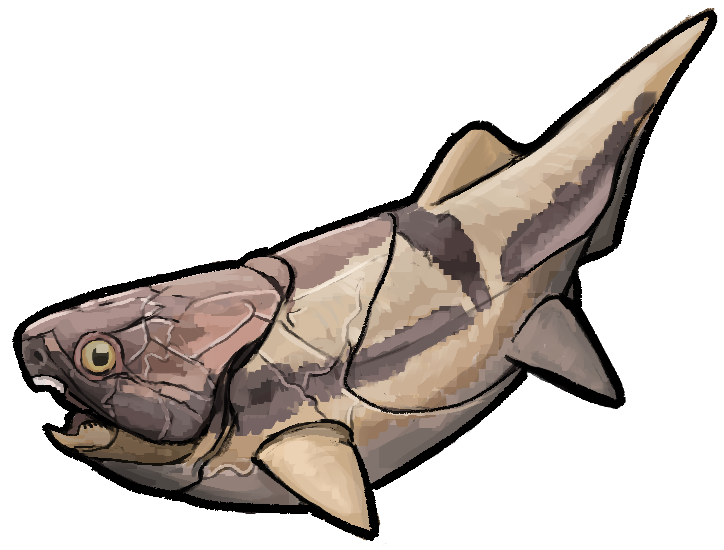

Scientific classification
- Kingdom: Animalia
- Phylum: Chordata
- Class: †Placodermi
- Order: †Arthrodira
- Suborder: †Brachythoraci
- Clade: †Eubrachythoraci
- Clade: †Coccosteomorphi
- Superfamily: †Incisoscutoidea
- Genus: †Compagopiscis; Gardiner & Miles, 1994

Species
- Compagopiscis croucheri Gardiner & Miles, 1994 (type)

= Compagopiscis =

Compagopiscis Temporal range: Late Devonian: Frasnian, 382.7–372.2 Ma

Extinct genus of armoured fish

Compagopiscis is an extinct genus of placoderm known from the Gogo Formation. It lived in the Upper Devonian (Frasnian stage) of Western Australia. The genus is monotypic, with its only species being Compagopiscis croucheri.

== Description ==
Compagopiscis is one of the earliest known vertebrates to have teeth. An analysis of its bite force suggests that it was a generalist predator, having a diverse diet. Fossils have been found in numbers, suggesting possible schooling behavior.

== Phylogeny ==
Compagopiscis was originally classified as a member of the family Plourdosteidae. However, phylogenetic analysis later found Plourdosteidae to be an invalid grouping, and the family was dismissed. Torosteus is now considered to be a member of the superfamily Incisoscutoidea, which belongs to the clade Coccosteomorphi, one of the two major clades within Eubrachythoraci. The cladogram below shows the phylogeny of Compagopiscis:

- Eubrachythoraci
  - Coccosteomorphi
    - Coccosteoidea
      - Coccosteidae
        - - Millerosteus minor
          - Coccosteus cuspidatus
        - - Dickosteus threiplandi
          - Watsonosteus fletti
          - Protitanichthys rockportensis
      - Panxiosteidae
        - Plourdosteus canadensis
        - Panxiosteus ocullus
        - Janiosteus timanicus
    - Incisoscutoidea
      - Harrytoombsia elegans
      - - Torosteus tuberculatus
        - Torosteus pulchellus
      - - Mcnamaraspis kaprios
        - - Compagopiscis croucheri
          - Trematosteus fontanellus
          - Camuropiscidae
            - - Incisoscutum ritchiei
              - Incisoscutum sarahae
            - - Rolfosteus canningensis
              - - Tubonasus lennardensis
                - - Fallacosteus turneri
                  - - Camuropiscis laidlawi
                    - Latocamurus coulthardi
  - Pachyosteomorphi
