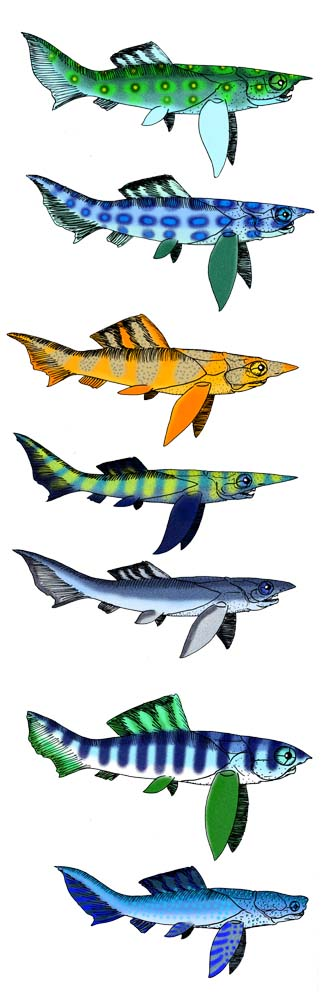
- Reconstructions of the various members of the arthrodire placoderm family Camuropiscidae. From top is Camuropiscis laidlawi, C. concinnus, Fallacosteus turneri, Rolfosteus canningensis, Tubonasus lennardensis, Latocamurus coulthardi, and Simosteus tuberculatus.

Scientific classification
- Kingdom: Animalia
- Phylum: Chordata
- Class: †Placodermi
- Order: †Arthrodira
- Suborder: †Brachythoraci
- Clade: †Eubrachythoraci
- Clade: †Coccosteomorphi
- Superfamily: †Incisoscutoidea
- Family: †Camuropiscidae; Dennis & Miles, 1979

Genera
- Camuropiscis; Fallacosteus; Incisoscutum ?; Latocamurus; Rolfosteus; Simosteus; Tubonasus

= Camuropiscidae =

Camuropiscidae Temporal range: Late Devonian: Frasnian, 382.7–372.2 Ma

Extinct family of fishes

Camuropiscidae is a family of mostly small, bullet or spindle-shaped extinct arthrodire placoderms from the Late Devonian. With the exception of the snub-nosed Simosteus, camuropiscid placoderms are characterized by an elongated, tubular snout. The entire family is restricted to the Frasnian Gogo Reef Formation of Australia.

The camuropiscids' elongated snouts, streamlined body shape, and rapid jaw closure are thought as adaptations for pelagic, pursuit predators, swallowing their prey whole.

== Phylogeny ==
Camuropiscidae is a member of the superfamily Incisoscutoidea, which belongs to the clade Coccosteomorphi, one of the two major clades within Eubrachythoraci. The cladogram below shows the phylogeny of Camuropiscidae:

- Eubrachythoraci
  - Coccosteomorphi
    - Coccosteoidea
      - Coccosteidae
        - - Millerosteus minor
          - Coccosteus cuspidatus
        - - Dickosteus threiplandi
          - Watsonosteus fletti
          - Protitanichthys rockportensis
      - Panxiosteidae
        - Plourdosteus canadensis
        - Panxiosteus ocullus
        - Janiosteus timanicus
    - Incisoscutoidea
      - Harrytoombsia elegans
      - - Torosteus tuberculatus
        - Torosteus pulchellus
      - - Mcnamaraspis kaprios
        - - Compagopiscis croucheri
          - Trematosteus fontanellus
          - Camuropiscidae
            - - Incisoscutum ritchiei
              - Incisoscutum sarahae
            - - Rolfosteus canningensis
              - - Tubonasus lennardensis
                - - Fallacosteus turneri
                  - - Camuropiscis laidlawi
                    - Latocamurus coulthardi
  - Pachyosteomorphi
