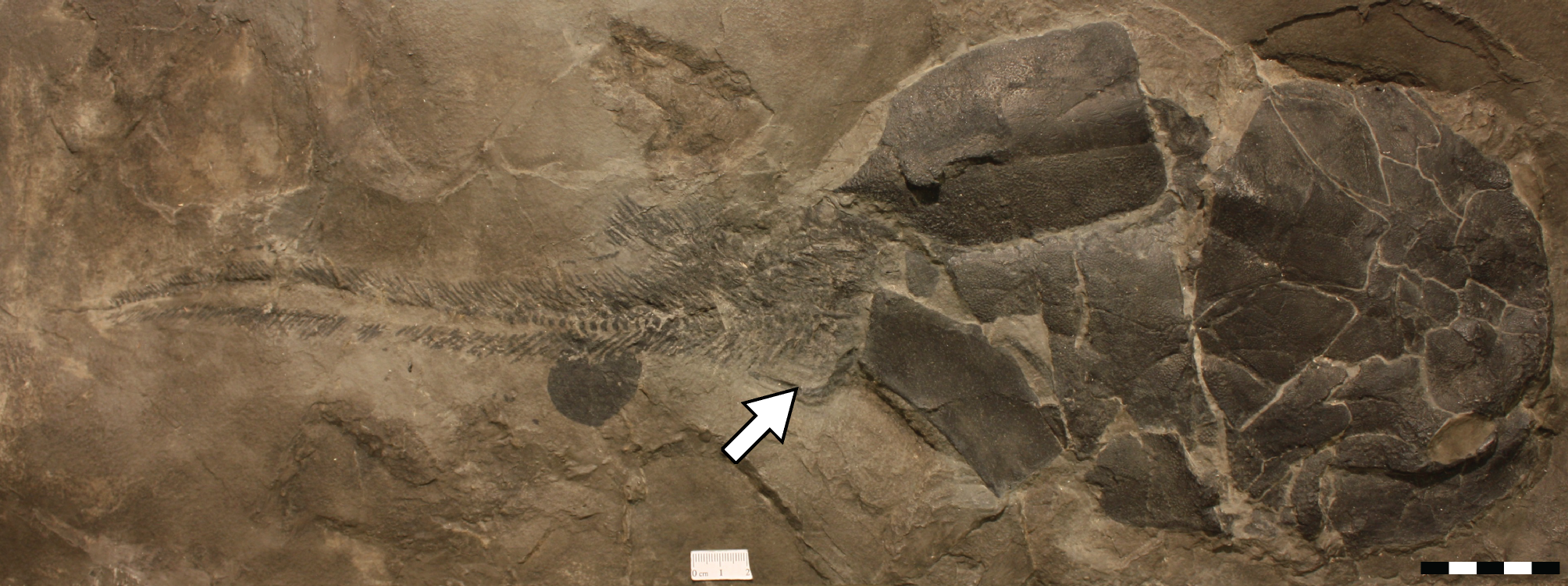
- Watsonosteus fossil specimen

Scientific classification
- Kingdom: Animalia
- Phylum: Chordata
- Class: †Placodermi
- Order: †Arthrodira
- Suborder: †Brachythoraci
- Family: †Coccosteidae
- Genus: †Watsonosteus; Miles & Westoll, 1963

Species
- Watsonosteus fletti (Watson, 1932) (type)

Synonyms
- Coccosteus fletti Watson, 1932

= Watsonosteus =

Watsonosteus Temporal range: Middle Devonian: Late Givetian, 387.7–382.7 Ma

Extinct genus of fishes

Watsonosteus is an extinct genus of coccosteid arthrodire placoderm from the Late Givetian stage of the Middle Devonian period. Fossils are found in the Orkney Islands, Scotland. It was a small placoderm with a total body length of 57 cm (22 in), with the largest individuals reaching lengths of 1 m (39 in). It is one of the few arthrodires for which complete body fossils are known.

== Phylogeny ==
Watsonosteus is a member of the family Coccosteidae, which belongs to the clade Coccosteomorphi, one of the two major clades within Eubrachythoraci. The cladogram below shows the phylogeny of Watsonosteus:

- Eubrachythoraci
  - Coccosteomorphi
    - Coccosteoidea
      - Coccosteidae
        - - Millerosteus minor
          - Coccosteus cuspidatus
        - - Dickosteus threiplandi
          - Watsonosteus fletti
          - Protitanichthys rockportensis
      - Panxiosteidae
        - Plourdosteus canadensis
        - Panxiosteus ocullus
        - Janiosteus timanicus
    - Incisoscutoidea
      - Harrytoombsia elegans
      - - Torosteus tuberculatus
        - Torosteus pulchellus
      - - Mcnamaraspis kaprios
        - - Compagopiscis croucheri
          - Trematosteus fontanellus
          - Camuropiscidae
            - - Incisoscutum ritchiei
              - Incisoscutum sarahae
            - - Rolfosteus canningensis
              - - Tubonasus lennardensis
                - - Fallacosteus turneri
                  - - Camuropiscis laidlawi
                    - Latocamurus coulthardi
  - Pachyosteomorphi
