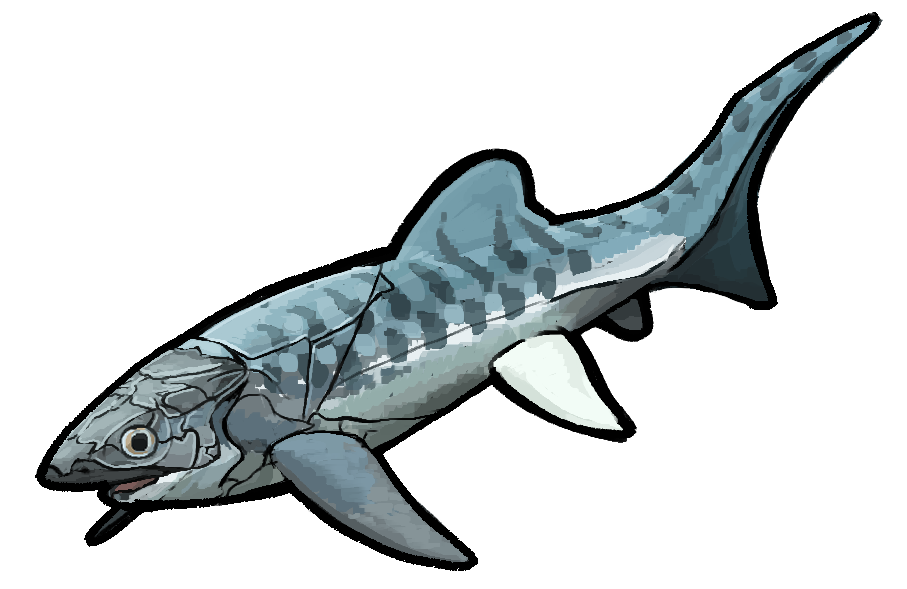

Scientific classification
- Kingdom: Animalia
- Phylum: Chordata
- Class: †Placodermi
- Order: †Arthrodira
- Suborder: †Brachythoraci
- Family: †Camuropiscidae
- Genus: †Tubonasus; Dennis and Miles, 1979

Species
- Tubonasus lennardensis Dennis and Miles, 1979

= Tubonasus =

Tubonasus Temporal range: Late Devonian: Frasnian, 382.7–372.2 Ma

Extinct genus of fishes

Tubonasus (meaning "tube nose") is an extinct monospecific genus of long-snouted arthrodire placoderm from the Early Frasnian stage of the Late Devonian period, found at the Gogo Formation of Kimberley, Western Australia.

Tubonasus is interpreted as a pelagic pursuit predator, and had the ability of swallowing prey whole. Like other camuropiscids, it has an elongated rostrum, streamlined body, and narrow infragnathals.

== Phylogeny ==
Tubonasus is a member of the family Camuropiscidae under the superfamily Incisoscutoidea, which belongs to the clade Coccosteomorphi, one of the two major clades within Eubrachythoraci. The cladogram below shows the phylogeny of Tubonasus:

- Eubrachythoraci
  - Coccosteomorphi
    - Coccosteoidea
      - Coccosteidae
        - - Millerosteus minor
          - Coccosteus cuspidatus
        - - Dickosteus threiplandi
          - Watsonosteus fletti
          - Protitanichthys rockportensis
      - Panxiosteidae
        - Plourdosteus canadensis
        - Panxiosteus ocullus
        - Janiosteus timanicus
    - Incisoscutoidea
      - Harrytoombsia elegans
      - - Torosteus tuberculatus
        - Torosteus pulchellus
      - - Mcnamaraspis kaprios
        - - Compagopiscis croucheri
          - Trematosteus fontanellus
          - Camuropiscidae
            - - Incisoscutum ritchiei
              - Incisoscutum sarahae
            - - Rolfosteus canningensis
              - - Tubonasus lennardensis
                - - Fallacosteus turneri
                  - - Camuropiscis laidlawi
                    - Latocamurus coulthardi
  - Pachyosteomorphi
