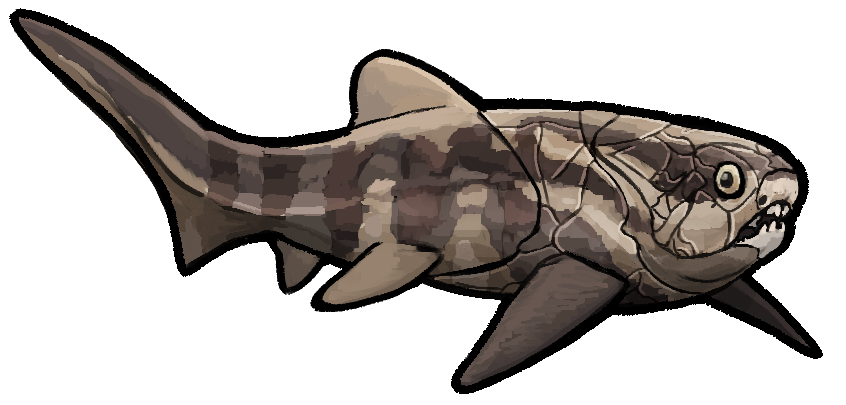
- Artist's reconstruction of M. kaprios

Scientific classification
- Kingdom: Animalia
- Phylum: Chordata
- Class: †Placodermi
- Order: †Arthrodira
- Suborder: †Brachythoraci
- Clade: †Eubrachythoraci
- Clade: †Coccosteomorphi
- Superfamily: †Incisoscutoidea
- Genus: †Mcnamaraspis; Long, 1995

Species
- Mcnamaraspis kaprios Long, 1995 (type)

= Mcnamaraspis =

Mcnamaraspis Temporal range: Late Devonian: Frasnian, 382.7–372.2 Ma

Extinct genus of fishes

Mcnamaraspis is an extinct monospecific genus of arthrodire placoderm that inhabited the ancient reef system of north Western Australia during the Frasnian epoch of the Late Devonian period (c. 380-375 million years ago). The type specimen was found and described by John A. Long from the Gogo Formation near Fitzroy Crossing. This fossil fish showed new anatomical features in arthrodires, like the well-preserved annular (ring-shaped) cartilages of the snout, previously inferred to be present by Erik Stensiö of Sweden. It is occasionally referred to as "The Gogo Fish" after the locale the holotype was excavated from.

On 5 December 1995, the type species, M. kaprios, was officially proclaimed as the State Fossil emblem of Western Australia by the Governor of Western Australia, thus becoming the first official state fossil emblem for any state of Australia.

== Description ==
M. kaprios is an extinct marine fish that grew up to 0.5 m (1.6 ft) in length. With its large eyes, articulated jaw and sharp, razorlike dentition plates, it can be inferred that this midsize placoderm was an active predator that specialized in cracking through the shelled defenses of arthropods such as trilobites. It has a distinct cartilaginous snout not recorded in other placoderms.

== Phylogeny ==
Mcnamaraspis was originally classified as a member of the family Plourdosteidae. However, phylogenetic analysis later found Plourdosteidae to be an invalid grouping, and the family was dismissed. Mcnamaraspis is now considered to be a member of the superfamily Incisoscutoidea, which belongs to the clade Coccosteomorphi, one of the two major clades within Eubrachythoraci. The cladogram below shows the phylogeny of Mcnamaraspis:

- Eubrachythoraci
  - Coccosteomorphi
    - Coccosteoidea
      - Coccosteidae
        - - Millerosteus minor
          - Coccosteus cuspidatus
        - - Dickosteus threiplandi
          - Watsonosteus fletti
          - Protitanichthys rockportensis
      - Panxiosteidae
        - Plourdosteus canadensis
        - Panxiosteus ocullus
        - Janiosteus timanicus
    - Incisoscutoidea
      - Harrytoombsia elegans
      - - Torosteus tuberculatus
        - Torosteus pulchellus
      - - Mcnamaraspis kaprios
        - - Compagopiscis croucheri
          - Trematosteus fontanellus
          - Camuropiscidae
            - - Incisoscutum ritchiei
              - Incisoscutum sarahae
            - - Rolfosteus canningensis
              - - Tubonasus lennardensis
                - - Fallacosteus turneri
                  - - Camuropiscis laidlawi
                    - Latocamurus coulthardi
  - Pachyosteomorphi
