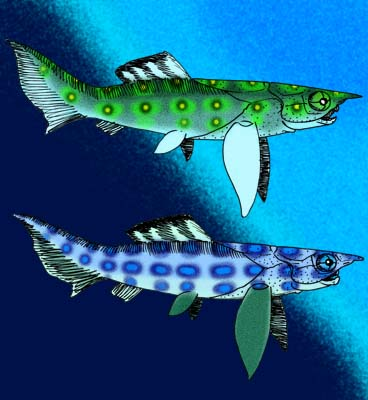
- Reconstruction of Camuropiscis laidlawi (top), and C. concinnus, from the Gogo Reef of Late Devonian Australia

Scientific classification
- Kingdom: Animalia
- Phylum: Chordata
- Class: †Placodermi
- Order: †Arthrodira
- Suborder: †Brachythoraci
- Family: †Camuropiscidae
- Genus: †Camuropiscis; Dennis & Miles, 1979

Species
- Camuropiscis concinnus Dennis & Miles, 1979 (type); Camuropiscis laidlawi Dennis & Miles, 1979

= Camuropiscis =

Camuropiscis Temporal range: Late Devonian: Frasnian, 382.7–372.2 Ma

Genus of fishes (fossil)

Camuropiscis is an extinct genus of arthrodire placoderm from the Early Frasnian stage of the Late Devonian period, found at the Gogo Formation of Kimberley, Western Australia. The species of Camuropiscis had a flattened, elongated snout that may have aided in enhancing its hydrodynamic streamlining.

== Etymology ==
Camuropiscis translates as "flat-nosed fish."

== Phylogeny ==
Camuropiscis is a member of the family Camuropiscidae under the superfamily Incisoscutoidea, which belongs to the clade Coccosteomorphi, one of the two major clades within Eubrachythoraci. The cladogram below shows the phylogeny of Camuropiscis:

- Eubrachythoraci
  - Coccosteomorphi
    - Coccosteoidea
      - Coccosteidae
        - - Millerosteus minor
          - Coccosteus cuspidatus
        - - Dickosteus threiplandi
          - Watsonosteus fletti
          - Protitanichthys rockportensis
      - Panxiosteidae
        - Plourdosteus canadensis
        - Panxiosteus ocullus
        - Janiosteus timanicus
    - Incisoscutoidea
      - Harrytoombsia elegans
      - - Torosteus tuberculatus
        - Torosteus pulchellus
      - - Mcnamaraspis kaprios
        - - Compagopiscis croucheri
          - Trematosteus fontanellus
          - Camuropiscidae
            - - Incisoscutum ritchiei
              - Incisoscutum sarahae
            - - Rolfosteus canningensis
              - - Tubonasus lennardensis
                - - Fallacosteus turneri
                  - - Camuropiscis laidlawi
                    - Latocamurus coulthardi
  - Pachyosteomorphi
