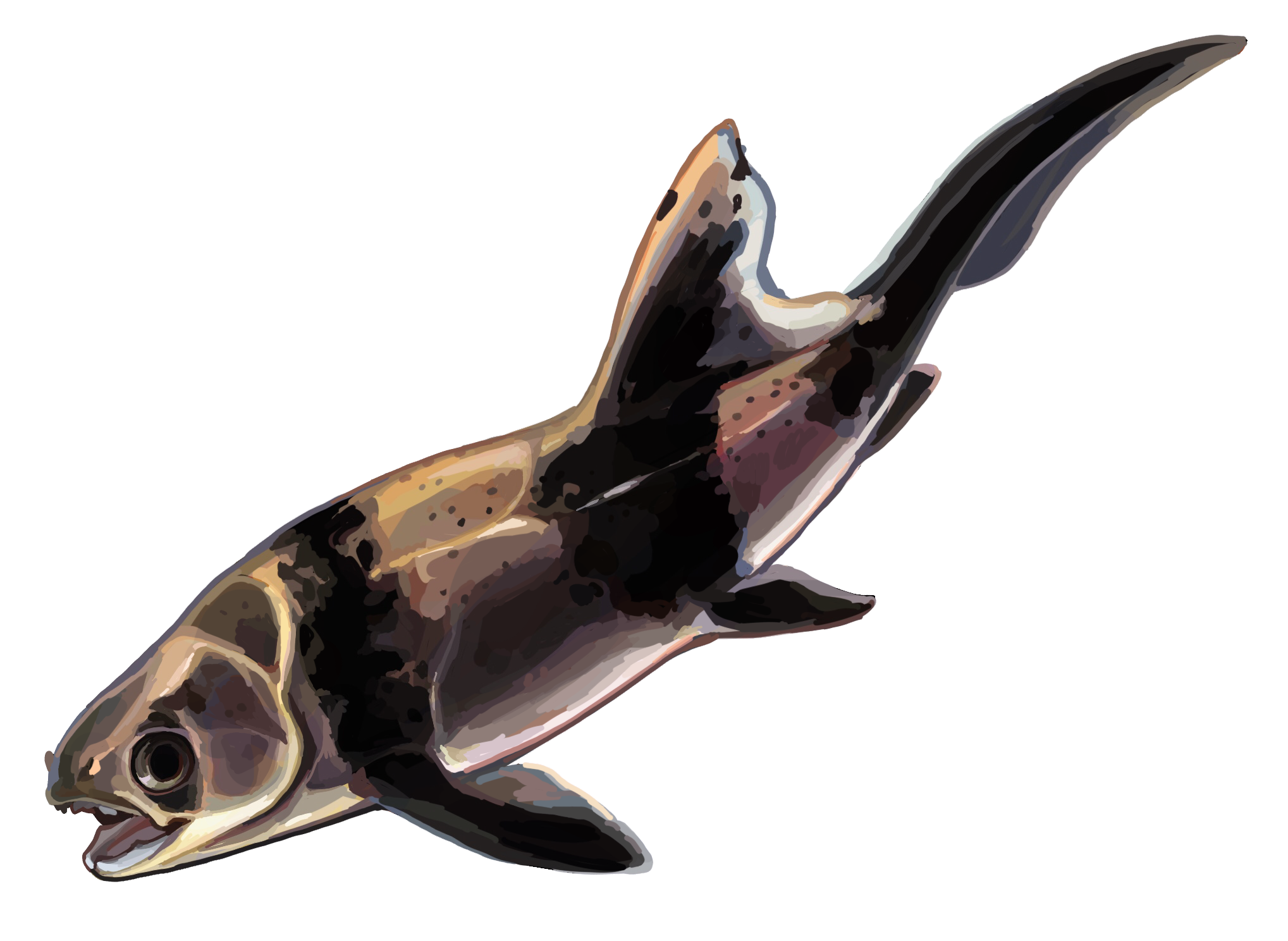
- Artist's reconstruction of Coccosteus cuspidatus

Scientific classification
- Kingdom: Animalia
- Phylum: Chordata
- Class: †Placodermi
- Order: †Arthrodira
- Suborder: †Brachythoraci
- Clade: †Eubrachythoraci
- Clade: †Coccosteomorphi
- Superfamily: †Coccosteoidea
- Family: †Coccosteidae; Traquir, 1888

Genera
- Belgiosteus; Clarkosteus; Coccosteus; Dickosteus; Jiuchengia; Livosteus; Millerosteus; Protitanichthys; Trachosteus; Watsonosteus; Woodwardosteus

= Coccosteidae =

Coccosteidae Temporal range: Late Emsian-Late Devonian, 393.3–358.9 Ma

Extinct family of fishes

Coccosteidae is a family of arthrodire placoderms from the Early to Late Devonian. Fossils appear in various strata in Europe, North America and China.

== Phylogeny ==
Coccosteidae belongs to the larger clade Coccosteomorphi, which together with its sister clade Pachyosteomorphi forms the group Eubrachythoraci. The phylogeny of Coccosteidae can be shown in the cladogram below:

- Eubrachythoraci
  - Coccosteomorphi
    - Coccosteoidea
      - Coccosteidae
        - - Millerosteus minor
          - Coccosteus cuspidatus
        - - Dickosteus threiplandi
          - Watsonosteus fletti
          - Protitanichthys rockportensis
      - Panxiosteidae
        - Plourdosteus canadensis
        - Panxiosteus ocullus
        - Janiosteus timanicus
    - Incisoscutoidea
      - Harrytoombsia elegans
      - - Torosteus tuberculatus
        - Torosteus pulchellus
      - - Mcnamaraspis kaprios
        - - Compagopiscis croucheri
          - Trematosteus fontanellus
          - Camuropiscidae
            - - Incisoscutum ritchiei
              - Incisoscutum sarahae
            - - Rolfosteus canningensis
              - - Tubonasus lennardensis
                - - Fallacosteus turneri
                  - - Camuropiscis laidlawi
                    - Latocamurus coulthardi
  - Pachyosteomorphi
    - Rhachiosteus pterygiatus
    - - Dunkleosteoidea
        - Eastmanosteus calliaspis
        - - - Eastmanosteus pustulosus
            - Kiangyousteus yohii
          - - Golshanichthys asiatica
            - - Westralichthys uwagedensis
              - - - Dunkleosteus raveri
                  - Dunkleosteus terrelli
                - - Dunkleosteus amblyodoratus
                  - Heterostiidae
                    - Heterosteus ingens
                    - Yinosteus major
      - Aspinothoracidi
        - Tapinosteus heintzi
        - - - Bullerichthys fascidens
            - - Kendrickichthys cavernosus
              - Bruntonichthys multidens
          - - Dinichthys herzeri
            - - Hadrosteus rapax
              - - Gorgonichthys clarki
                - Selenosteidae
                  - Heintzichthys gouldii
                  - Pachyosteus bulla
                  - Gymnotrachelus hydei
                  - Stenosteus angustopectus
                  - Brachyosteus dietrichi
                  - - Melanosteus occitanus
                    - Rhinosteus parvulus

== Genera ==
=== Belgiosteus ===
A genus of very large coccosteids. Species are found in Middle Devonian Belgium and China.

=== Coccosteus ===
The type genus of the family. Numerous species are found in Middle to Upper Devonian strata throughout Europe and parts of North America.

=== Jiuchengia ===
The earliest known coccosteid from Late Emsian Yunnan province, China. It is distinguished from other coccosteids by having an elongated occipital.

=== Livosteus ===
A genus of very large coccosteids known from Middle to Late Devonian strata of Eastern Europe.

=== Millerosteus ===
A genus of very small coccosteids known from Middle to Late Devonian strata throughout Europe. Some species are found in the same strata with certain species of Coccosteus.
