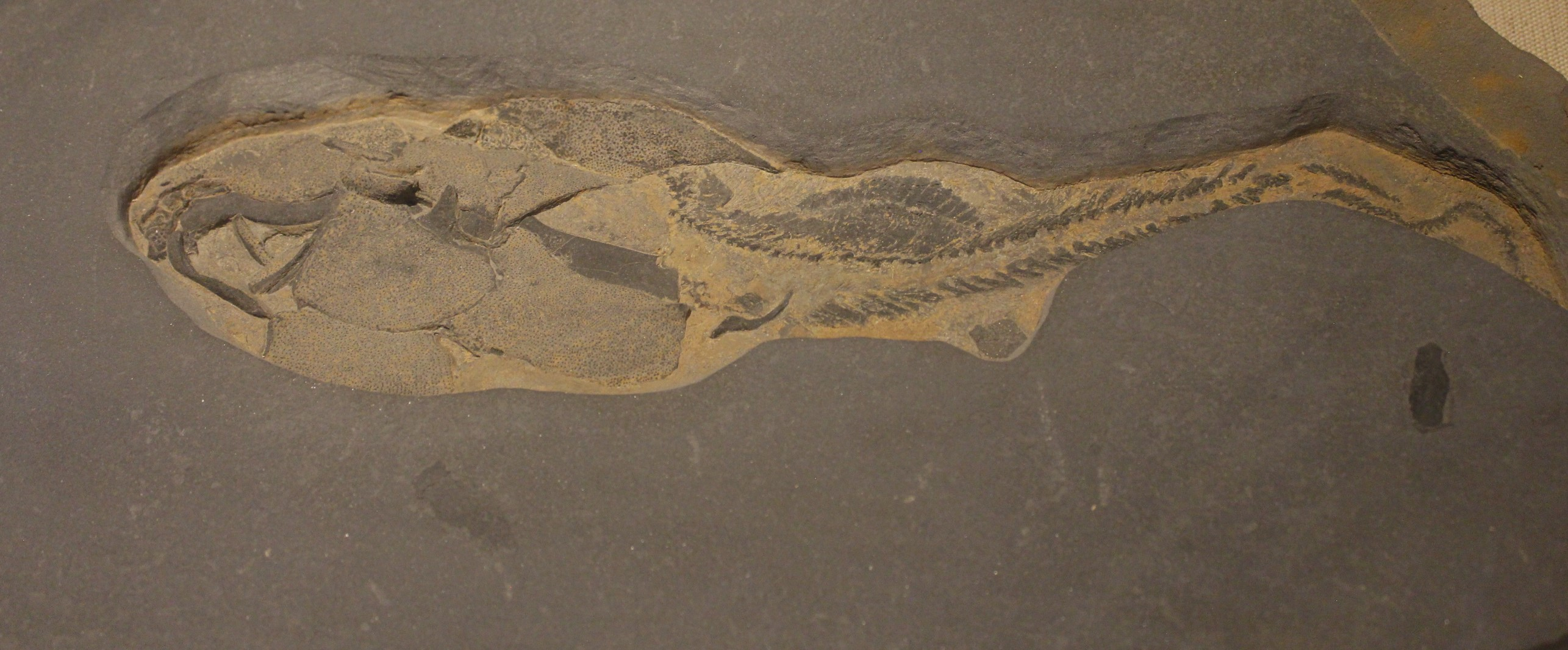
- C. cuspidatus specimen IVPP V19322, Paleozoological Museum of China

Scientific classification
- Kingdom: Animalia
- Phylum: Chordata
- Class: †Placodermi
- Order: †Arthrodira
- Suborder: †Brachythoraci
- Family: †Coccosteidae
- Genus: †Coccosteus; Agassiz, 1843

Type species
- Coccosteus cuspidatus Miller, 1841

Species
- List: Coccosteus canadensis Woodward, 1892; Coccosteus carbonarius M'Coy, 1848; Coccosteus chamberlini Bryant, 1932; Coccosteus cuspidatus Miller, 1841 (type); Coccosteus cuyahogae Claypole, 1998; Coccosteus decipiens Agassiz, 1841; Coccosteus disjectus Woodward, 1891; Coccosteus grossi Obrucheva, 1962; Coccosteus hercynius von Meyer, 1852; Coccosteus macromus Cope, 1892; Coccosteus markae Obrucheva, 1962; Coccosteus minor Miller, 1858; Coccosteus occidentalis Newberry, 1875; ? Coccosteus orvikui Gross, 1940; Coccosteus terranovae Obruchev, 1934

= Coccosteus =

Coccosteus Temporal range: Middle to Late Devonian, 393.3–359.3 Ma

Extinct genus of fishes

Coccosteus (from Greek: κόκκος kókkos, 'berry' and Greek: ὀστέον ostéon 'bone') is an extinct genus of arthrodire placoderm from the Devonian period. Its fossils have been found throughout Europe and North America. The majority of these have been found in freshwater sediments, though such a large range suggests that they may have been able to enter saltwater. It was a small placoderm, with Coccosteus cuspidatus measuring 29.6–39.4 cm (11.7–15.5 in) long.

== Description ==
Life reconstruction of C. cuspidatus

Like all other arthrodires, Coccosteus had a joint between the armor of the body and skull. It also had an internal joint between its neck vertebrae and the back of the skull, allowing for the mouth to be opened even wider. Along with the longer jaws, this allowed Coccosteus to feed on fairly large prey. The up-and-down movement of the skull also allowed for more water to be pumped through the gills. Possibly, the creature supplemented its diet with organic material filtered from mud using the gills. As with all other arthrodires, Coccosteus had bony dental plates embedded in its jaws, forming a beak. The beak was kept sharp by having the edges of the dental plates grind away at each other. Overall the creature looked similar to its gigantic cousin Dunkleosteus, save that its eyes were closer to the end of its snout than in its larger relative.

== Phylogeny ==
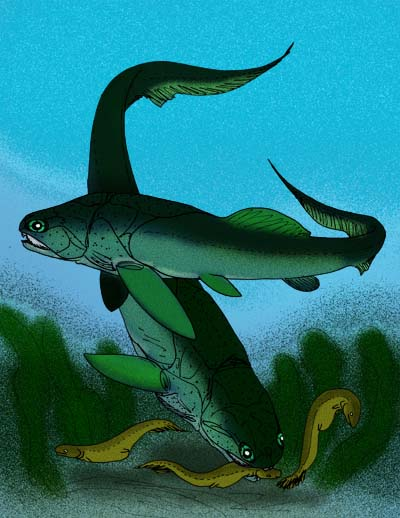
C. cuspidatus restoration, shown attacking multiple Palaeospondylus

Coccosteus is the type genus for family Coccosteidae, which belongs to the clade Coccosteomorphi, one of the two major clades within Eubrachythoraci. The cladogram below shows the phylogeny of Coccosteus:

- Eubrachythoraci
  - Coccosteomorphi
    - Coccosteoidea
      - Coccosteidae
        - - Millerosteus minor
          - Coccosteus cuspidatus
        - - Dickosteus threiplandi
          - Watsonosteus fletti
          - Protitanichthys rockportensis
      - Panxiosteidae
        - Plourdosteus canadensis
        - Panxiosteus ocullus
        - Janiosteus timanicus
    - Incisoscutoidea
      - Harrytoombsia elegans
      - - Torosteus tuberculatus
        - Torosteus pulchellus
      - - Mcnamaraspis kaprios
        - - Compagopiscis croucheri
          - Trematosteus fontanellus
          - Camuropiscidae
            - - Incisoscutum ritchiei
              - Incisoscutum sarahae
            - - Rolfosteus canningensis
              - - Tubonasus lennardensis
                - - Fallacosteus turneri
                  - - Camuropiscis laidlawi
                    - Latocamurus coulthardi
  - Pachyosteomorphi

=== Species ===
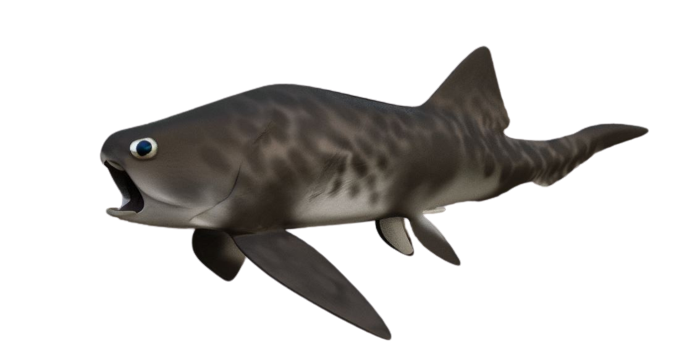
C. cuyahogae reconstruction

- C. cuspidatus is the type species, and is an important index fossil in the continental Devonian sequence of northern Scotland deposited in the Orcadian Basin. It is only present at and below the Upper Eifelian Achanarras limestone level.

== See also ==
- List of placoderms
