= Givetian =

Fifth stage of the devonian and second stage of the Middle Devonian

- 387.95 ± 1.04 – 382.31 ± 1.36 Ma

Chronology
← / Hangenberg event, Famennian glaciation; ← / Kellwasser event (Late Devonian mass extinction); ← / Widespread shrubs & trees; ← / Hunsrück fauna; ← / Rhynie chert
Subdivision of the Devonian according to the ICS, as of 2024; Vertical axis scale: Millions of years ago

Etymology
- Name formality: Formal

Usage information
- Celestial body: Earth
- Regional usage: Global (ICS)
- Time scale(s) used: ICS Time Scale

Definition
- Chronological unit: Age
- Stratigraphic unit: Stage
- Time span formality: Formal
- Lower boundary definition: FAD of the conodont Polygnathus hemiansatus
- Lower boundary GSSP: Jebel Mech Irdane, Tafilalt, Morocco; 31.2374°N 4.3541°W
- Lower GSSP ratified: 1994
- Upper boundary definition: FAD of the conodont Ancyrodella rotundiloba
- Upper boundary GSSP: Col du Puech de la Suque, Montagne Noire, France; 43.5032°N 3.0868°E
- Upper GSSP ratified: 1986

The Givetian is one of two faunal stages in the Middle Devonian Period. It lasted from 387.95 million years ago to 382.31 million years ago. It was preceded by the Eifelian Stage and followed by the Frasnian Stage. It is named after the town of Givet in France. The oldest forests occurred during the late Givetian. The lower GSSP is located at Jebel Mech Irdane, Tafilalt, Morocco.

== Name and definition ==
The Givetian Stage was proposed in 1879 by French geologist Jules Gosselet and was accepted for the higher stage of the Middle Devonian by the Subcommission on Devonian Stratigraphy in 1981.
