= Frasnian =

First age of the Late Devonian epoch

- 382.31 ± 1.36 – 372.15 ± 0.46 Ma
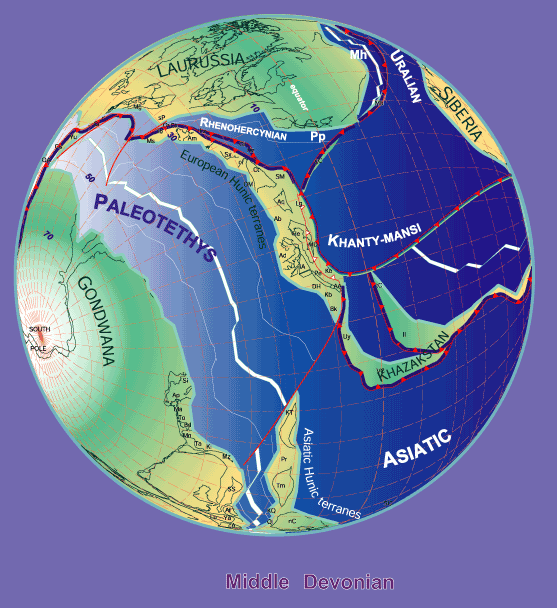
- Paleogeography of the Late Devonian, 380 Ma

Chronology
← / Hangenberg event, Famennian glaciation; ← / Kellwasser event (Late Devonian mass extinction); ← / Widespread shrubs & trees; ← / Hunsrück fauna; ← / Rhynie chert
Subdivision of the Devonian according to the ICS, as of 2024; Vertical axis scale: Millions of years ago

Etymology
- Name formality: Formal

Usage information
- Celestial body: Earth
- Regional usage: Global (ICS)
- Time scale(s) used: ICS Time Scale

Definition
- Chronological unit: Age
- Stratigraphic unit: Stage
- Time span formality: Formal
- Lower boundary definition: FAD of the conodont Ancyrodella rotundiloba
- Lower boundary GSSP: Col du Puech de la Suque, Montagne Noire, France; 43.5032°N 3.0868°E
- Lower GSSP ratified: 1986
- Upper boundary definition: FAD of the conodont Palmatolepis triangularis LAD of the conodonts Ancyrodella and Ozarkodina and the goniatites Gephuroceratidae and Beloceratidae
- Upper boundary GSSP: Coumiac quarry, Montagne Noire, France; 43.4613°N 3.0403°E
- Upper GSSP ratified: 1993

The Frasnian is one of two faunal stages in the Late Devonian Period. It lasted from 382.31 million years ago to 372.15 million years ago. It was preceded by the Givetian Stage and followed by the Famennian Stage.

Major reef-building was under way during the Frasnian Stage, particularly in western Canada and Australia. On land, the first forests were taking shape. In North America, the Antler orogeny peaked, which were contemporary with the Bretonic phase of the Variscan orogeny in Europe.

The Frasnian coincides with the second half of the "charcoal gap" in the fossil record, a time when atmospheric oxygen levels were below 13 percent, the minimum necessary to sustain wildfires.

North American subdivisions of the Frasnian include

- West Falls Group
- Sonyea Group
- Genesee Group

== Name and definition ==
The Frasnian Stage was proposed in 1879 by French geologist Jules Gosselet and was accepted for the lower stage of the Upper Devonian by the Subcommission on Devonian Stratigraphy in 1981. It is named after the village of Frasnes-lez-Couvin, in the district of Couvin, in Belgium.
