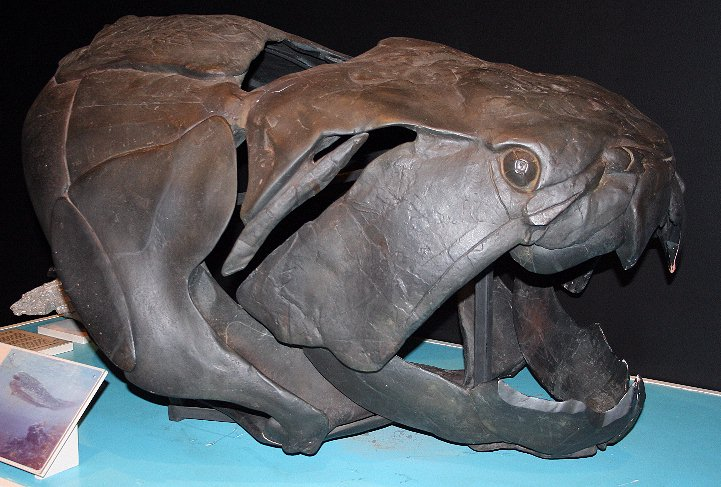
- Dunkleosteus terrelli skull, Queensland Museum

Scientific classification
- Kingdom: Animalia
- Phylum: Chordata
- Class: †Placodermi
- Order: †Arthrodira
- Suborder: †Brachythoraci
- Clade: †Eubrachythoraci
- Clade: †Pachyosteomorphi
- Superfamily: †Dunkleosteoidea
- Family: †Dunkleosteidae; Stensiö, 1963

Type species
- Dinichthys terrelli Newberry, 1873

Genera
- Dunkleosteus; Eastmanosteus; Golshanichthys; Heterosteus; Kiangyousteus; Xiangshuiosteus?

= Dunkleosteidae =

Dunkleosteidae Temporal range: Late Emsian to Late Famennian, ~393.3–358.9 Ma

Extinct family of fishes

Dunkleosteidae is an extinct family of arthrodire placoderms that lived during the Devonian period. The gigantic apex predator Dunkleosteus terrelli is the best known member of this group.

== Phylogeny ==
While members of Dunkleosteidae were previously thought to be close relatives of the genus Dinichthys (when they were not synonymized as each other) and grouped together in the family Dinichthyidae, more recent phylogenetic studies have shown that the two taxa represent two very distinct clades within Arthrodira. Dunkleosteidae was then established as the sister taxon to the family Panxiosteidae, which together comprised the superfamily Dunkleosteoidea (one of the three major clades of Eubrachythoraci). Dunkleosteidae was thus cladistically defined as including the type genus Dunkleosteus and all other genera in Dunkleosteoidea more closely related to Dunkleosteus than to Panxiosteus.

The phylogeny of Dunkleosteidae from the 2013 Zhu & Zhu study is shown in the cladogram below:

- Eubrachythoraci
  - - Coccosteomorphi
      - Coccosteus cuspidatus
      - - Harrytoombsia elegans
        - - Mcnamaraspis kaprios
          - Incisoscutoidea
            - Compagopiscis croucheri
            - - Incisoscutum ritchiei
              - Incisoscutum sarahae
            - Camuropiscidae
              - Latocamurus coulthardi
              - Camuropiscis laidlawi
              - - Rolfosteus canningensis
                - Tubonasus lennardensis
                - Fallacosteus turneri
    - Aspinothoracidi
      - Dinichthys herzeri
      - - Hadrosteus rapax
        - - Gorgonichthys clarki
          - - Heintzichthys gouldii
            - Selenosteidae
              - Stenosteus angustopectus
              - - Gymnotrachelus hydei
                - - Rhinosteus parvulus
                  - Pachyosteus bulla
  - Dunkleosteoidea
    - Westralichthys uwagedensis
    - - - Protitanichthys rockportensis
        - Panxiosteidae
          - Panxiosteus ocullus
          - Janiosteus timanicus
          - Plourdosteus canadensis
      - Dunkleosteidae
        - - Eastmanosteus calliaspis
          - Xiangshuiosteus wui
        - - Eastmanosteus pustulosus
          - Kiangyousteus yohii
          - Golshanichthys asiatica
          - - Dunkleosteus amblyodoratus
            - Dunkleosteus terrelli
            - Dunkleosteus raveri

However, the subsequent 2016 Zhu et al. study using a larger morphological dataset recovered Panxiosteidae well outside of Dunkleosteoidea, leaving the status of Dunkleosteidae as a clade grouping separate from Dunkleosteoidea in doubt, as shown in the cladogram below:

- Eubrachythoraci
  - Coccosteomorphi
    - Coccosteoidea
      - Coccosteidae
        - - Millerosteus minor
          - Coccosteus cuspidatus
        - - Dickosteus threiplandi
          - Watsonosteus fletti
          - Protitanichthys rockportensis
      - Panxiosteidae
        - Plourdosteus canadensis
        - Panxiosteus ocullus
        - Janiosteus timanicus
    - Incisoscutoidea
      - Harrytoombsia elegans
      - - Torosteus tuberculatus
        - Torosteus pulchellus
      - - Mcnamaraspis kaprios
        - - Compagopiscis croucheri
          - Trematosteus fontanellus
          - Camuropiscidae
            - - Incisoscutum ritchiei
              - Incisoscutum sarahae
            - - Rolfosteus canningensis
              - - Tubonasus lennardensis
                - - Fallacosteus turneri
                  - - Camuropiscis laidlawi
                    - Latocamurus coulthardi
  - Pachyosteomorphi
    - Rhachiosteus pterygiatus
    - - Dunkleosteoidea
        - Eastmanosteus calliaspis
        - - - Eastmanosteus pustulosus
            - Kiangyousteus yohii
          - - Golshanichthys asiatica
            - - Westralichthys uwagedensis
              - - - Dunkleosteus raveri
                  - Dunkleosteus terrelli
                - - Dunkleosteus amblyodoratus
                  - Heterostiidae
                    - Heterosteus ingens
                    - Yinosteus major
      - Aspinothoracidi
        - Tapinosteus heintzi
        - - - Bullerichthys fascidens
            - - Kendrickichthys cavernosus
              - Bruntonichthys multidens
          - - Dinichthys herzeri
            - - Hadrosteus rapax
              - - Gorgonichthys clarki
                - Selenosteidae
                  - Heintzichthys gouldii
                  - Pachyosteus bulla
                  - Gymnotrachelus hydei
                  - Stenosteus angustopectus
                  - Brachyosteus dietrichi
                  - - Melanosteus occitanus
                    - Rhinosteus parvulus

== Genera ==
=== Dunkleosteus ===
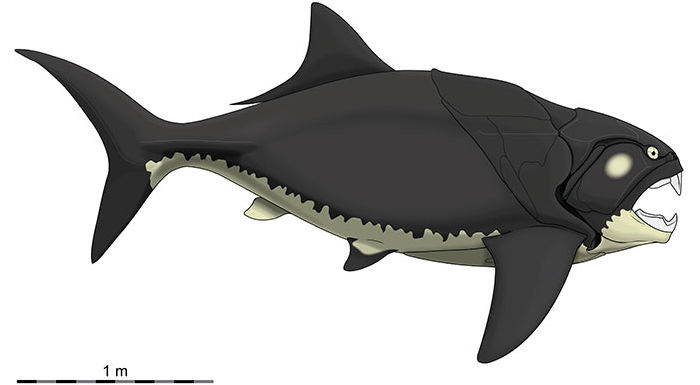
Restoration of D. terrelli

The type genus, Dunkleosteus, is known from Late Frasnian and Famennian-aged marine strata from Europe, Morocco, and North America. The best known species, D. terrelli, is famous as the "world's first vertebrate apex predator," and is estimated to be up to 6 m (20 ft) in length: other species, however, such as D. raveri, are estimated to be 1 m (3.3 ft) in length.

=== Eastmanosteus ===
Eastmanosteous is a diverse genus of medium to somewhat large predatory arthrodires very similar in anatomy to the species of Dunkleosteus. Eastmanosteus differs from Dunkleosteus in having a unique tubercle-ornamentation on the dermal surfaces of the plates, a distinctively shaped nuchal plate, and sutures that are more zigzagging. The best studied species, E. calliaspis may not be of this genus due to its recently appreciated relationship to the Emsian-aged genus Xiangshuiosteus.

=== Golshanichthys ===
Fossils of Golshanichthys are found in Frasnian-aged marine strata near Kerman, Iran.

=== Heterosteus ===
Heterosteus is from the middle Devonian, found in Europe and Greenland. It is one of the larger members of the family, with an estimated body length of up to 6 metres (20 ft).

=== Kiangyousteus ===
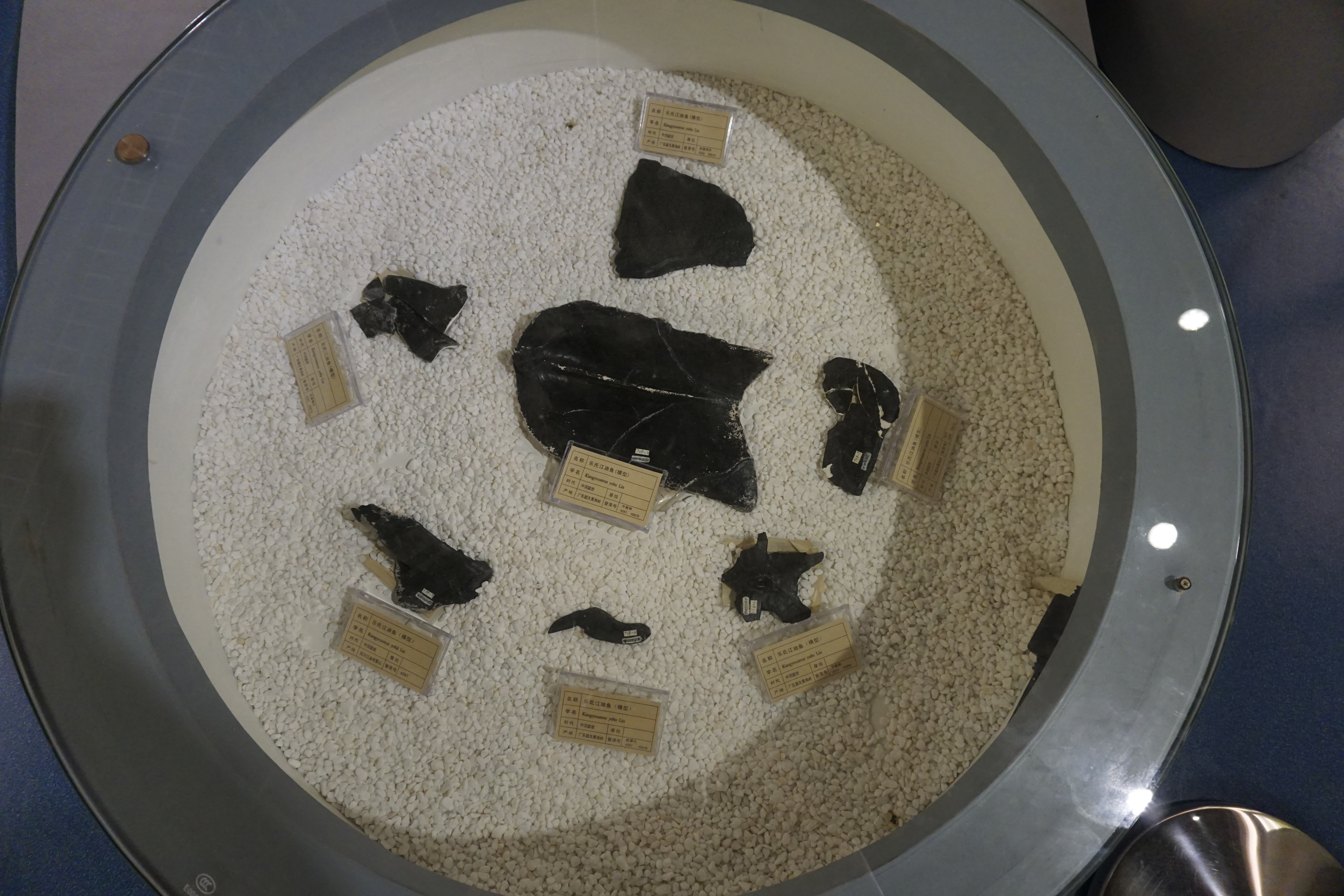
Kiangyousteus yohii

This Middle Devonian genus represents the first arthrodire described from China. Fossils are known from the Late Givetian to Early Frasnian-aged Guanwu Formation in Sichuan province.

=== Xiangshuiosteus ===
Xiangshuiosteus was originally described as an arthrodire incertae sedis of the Late Emsian with anatomical features suggestive of both buchanosteids and coccosteids. With the reappraisal of Kiangyousteus, it is now thought to be a dunkleosteid most closely related to Eastmanosteus calliaspis.
