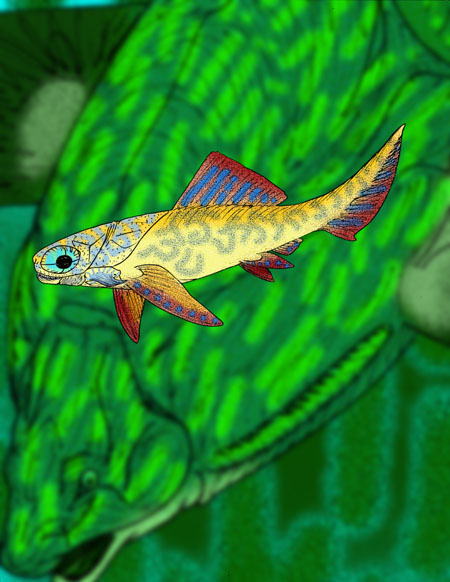

Scientific classification
- Kingdom: Animalia
- Phylum: Chordata
- Class: †Placodermi
- Order: †Arthrodira
- Suborder: †Brachythoraci
- Clade: †Eubrachythoraci
- Clade: †Pachyosteomorphi
- Clade: †Aspinothoracidi
- Genus: †Bruntonichthys; Dennis & Miles, 1980

Species
- Bruntonichthys multidens Dennis & Miles, 1980 (type)

= Bruntonichthys =

Bruntonichthys Temporal range: Late Devonian: Frasnian, 382.7–372.2 Ma

Extinct genus of fishes

Bruntonichthys is an extinct monospecific genus of arthrodire placoderm from the Early Frasnian stage of the Late Devonian period. Fossils are found in the Gogo Formation of the Kimberley region of Australia. The skull is about 139 millimetres long, and had disproportionally large eye sockets. Researchers suggest it may have preyed on small mollusks.

== Phylogeny ==
Bruntonichthys is a basal member of the clade Aspinothoracidi, which belongs to the clade Pachyosteomorphi, one of the two major clades within Eubrachythoraci. The cladogram below shows the phylogeny of Bruntonichthys:

- Eubrachythoraci
  - Coccosteomorphi
  - Pachyosteomorphi
    - Rhachiosteus pterygiatus
    - - Dunkleosteoidea
        - Eastmanosteus calliaspis
        - - - Eastmanosteus pustulosus
            - Kiangyousteus yohii
          - - Golshanichthys asiatica
            - - Westralichthys uwagedensis
              - - - Dunkleosteus raveri
                  - Dunkleosteus terrelli
                - - Dunkleosteus amblyodoratus
                  - Heterostiidae
                    - Heterosteus ingens
                    - Yinosteus major
      - Aspinothoracidi
        - Tapinosteus heintzi
        - - - Bullerichthys fascidens
            - - Kendrickichthys cavernosus
              - Bruntonichthys multidens
          - - Dinichthys herzeri
            - - Hadrosteus rapax
              - - Gorgonichthys clarki
                - Selenosteidae
                  - Heintzichthys gouldii
                  - Pachyosteus bulla
                  - Gymnotrachelus hydei
                  - Stenosteus angustopectus
                  - Brachyosteus dietrichi
                  - - Melanosteus occitanus
                    - Rhinosteus parvulus
