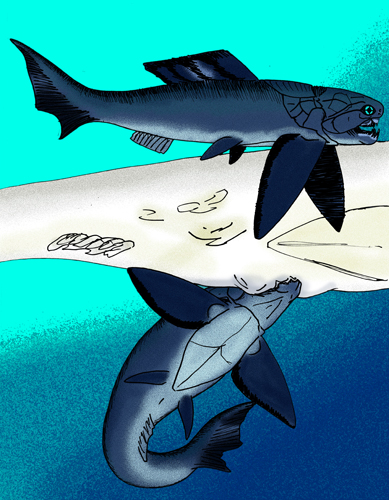

Scientific classification
- Kingdom: Animalia
- Phylum: Chordata
- Class: †Placodermi
- Order: †Arthrodira
- Clade: †Phlyctaenioidei
- Suborder: †Brachythoraci
- Clade: †Eubrachythoraci
- Clade: †Pachyosteomorphi
- Clade: †Aspinothoracidi
- Genus: †Dinichthys; Newberry, 1868

Species
- Dinichthys herzeri Newberry, 1868 (type)

Synonyms
- Ponerichthys Miller, 1892

= Dinichthys =

Dinichthys Temporal range: Late Devonian: Famennian, 371.1–359.3 Ma

Extinct genus of placoderm fish

Dinichthys (from Greek: δεινός deinós, 'terrible' and Greek: ἰχθύς ichthys 'fish') is an extinct monospecific genus of large marine arthrodire placoderm from the Late Devonian (Famennian stage) measuring around 3 metres (9.8 ft) long. Fossils were recovered from the Ohio Shale Formation along the Olentangy River in Delaware County, Ohio.

== Classification History ==
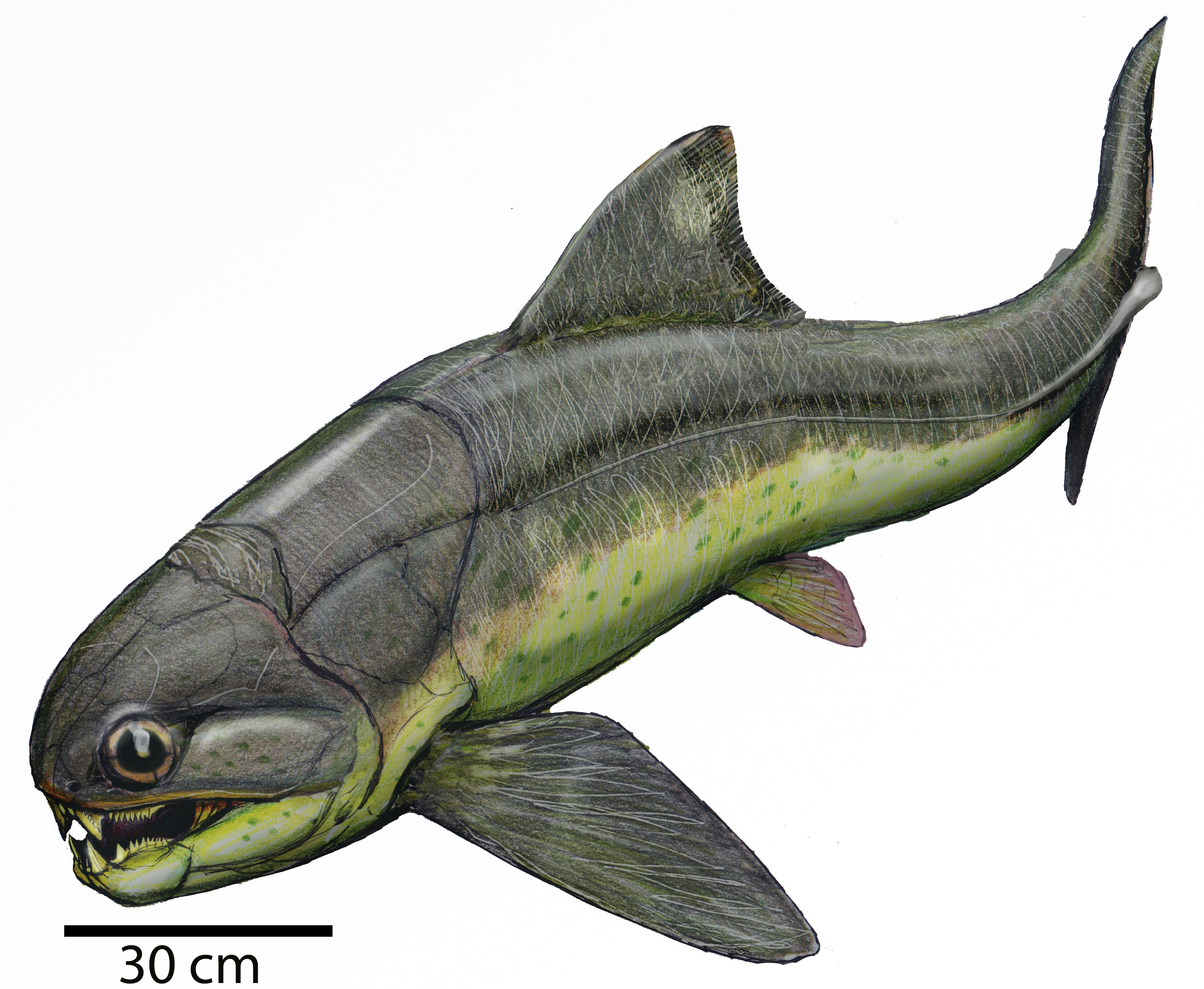
Life restoration

Dinichthys was originally described in 1868 by John Newberry on the basis of an incomplete skull roof and mandibles (holotype AMNH 81). Subsequently, many unrelated large arthrodires were originally classified together within this genus, including species now assigned to Dunkleosteus, Eastmanosteus, and Titanichthys. Notably, the type species of Dunkleosteus was originally described as Dinichthys terrelli by Newberry in 1873, and was later separated into Dunkleosteus by Jean-Pierre Lehman in 1956. Dunkleosteus was still thought to be closely related to Dinichthys, and they were grouped together in the family Dinichthyidae. However, in the 2010 Carr & Hlavin phylogenetic study, Dunkleosteus and Dinichthys were found to belong to two separate clades. Carr & Hlavin resurrected the family Dunkleosteidae and placed Dunkleosteus, Eastmanosteus, and a few other genera from Dinichthyidae within it. Dinichthyidae, in turn, is left a monospecific family and dismissed as a family grouping, and the genus Dinichthys is now considered a monotypic genus, containing only the type species, D. herzeri.

== Phylogeny ==
Dinichthys is a member of the clade Aspinothoracidi, which belongs to the clade Pachyosteomorphi, one of the two major clades within Eubrachythoraci. The cladogram below shows the phylogeny of Dinichthys:

- Eubrachythoraci
  - Coccosteomorphi
  - Pachyosteomorphi
    - Rhachiosteus pterygiatus
    - - Dunkleosteoidea
        - Eastmanosteus calliaspis
        - - - Eastmanosteus pustulosus
            - Kiangyousteus yohii
          - - Golshanichthys asiatica
            - - Westralichthys uwagedensis
              - - - Dunkleosteus raveri
                  - Dunkleosteus terrelli
                - - Dunkleosteus amblyodoratus
                  - Heterostiidae
                    - Heterosteus ingens
                    - Yinosteus major
      - Aspinothoracidi
        - Tapinosteus heintzi
        - - - Bullerichthys fascidens
            - - Kendrickichthys cavernosus
              - Bruntonichthys multidens
          - - Dinichthys herzeri
            - - Hadrosteus rapax
              - - Gorgonichthys clarki
                - Selenosteidae
                  - Heintzichthys gouldii
                  - Pachyosteus bulla
                  - Gymnotrachelus hydei
                  - Stenosteus angustopectus
                  - Brachyosteus dietrichi
                  - - Melanosteus occitanus
                    - Rhinosteus parvulus
