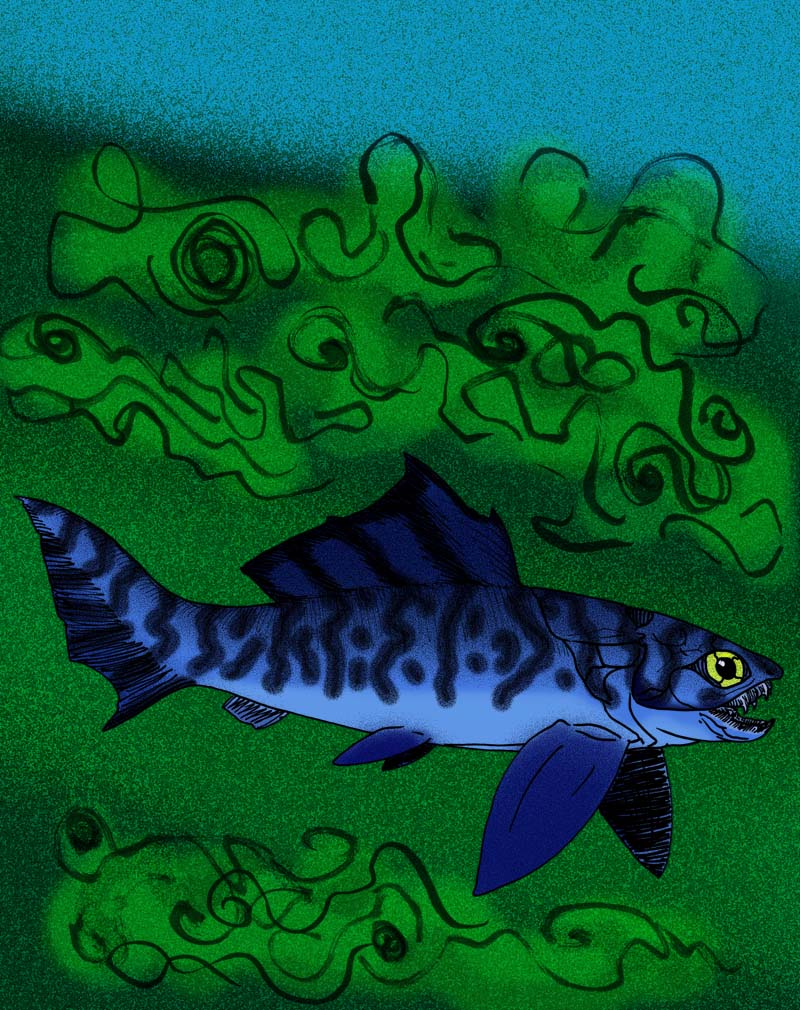
- Artist's reconstruction

Scientific classification
- Kingdom: Animalia
- Phylum: Chordata
- Class: †Placodermi
- Order: †Arthrodira
- Suborder: †Brachythoraci
- Clade: †Eubrachythoraci
- Clade: †Pachyosteomorphi
- Clade: †Aspinothoracidi
- Genus: †Hadrosteus; Gross, 1932

Species
- Hadrosteus rapax Gross, 1932 (type)

= Hadrosteus =

Hadrosteus Temporal range: Late Devonian: Frasnian, 382.7–372.2 Ma

Extinct genus of fishes

Hadrosteus is an extinct monospecific genus of large arthrodire placoderm from the Late Frasnian (Late Devonian) Kellwasserkalk facies of Bad Wildungen, Germany. It had large, double-pronged inferognathals (lower jawbones), and serrated edges along its mandible, strongly suggesting that it was a fish-eating predator. The head had a triangular snout, and the trunkshield was short, but high, with a median dorsal plate that was broader than wide. The average skull length is about 16 centimeters.

== Etymology ==
The type species Hadrosteus rapax means "Rapacious Strong-Bone".

== Phylogeny ==
Hadrosteus is a member of the clade Aspinothoracidi, which belongs to the clade Pachyosteomorphi, one of the two major clades within Eubrachythoraci. The cladogram below shows the phylogeny of Hadrosteus:

- Eubrachythoraci
  - Coccosteomorphi
  - Pachyosteomorphi
    - Rhachiosteus pterygiatus
    - - Dunkleosteoidea
        - Eastmanosteus calliaspis
        - - - Eastmanosteus pustulosus
            - Kiangyousteus yohii
          - - Golshanichthys asiatica
            - - Westralichthys uwagedensis
              - - - Dunkleosteus raveri
                  - Dunkleosteus terrelli
                - - Dunkleosteus amblyodoratus
                  - Heterostiidae
                    - Heterosteus ingens
                    - Yinosteus major
      - Aspinothoracidi
        - Tapinosteus heintzi
        - - - Bullerichthys fascidens
            - - Kendrickichthys cavernosus
              - Bruntonichthys multidens
          - - Dinichthys herzeri
            - - Hadrosteus rapax
              - - Gorgonichthys clarki
                - Selenosteidae
                  - Heintzichthys gouldii
                  - Pachyosteus bulla
                  - Gymnotrachelus hydei
                  - Stenosteus angustopectus
                  - Brachyosteus dietrichi
                  - - Melanosteus occitanus
                    - Rhinosteus parvulus
