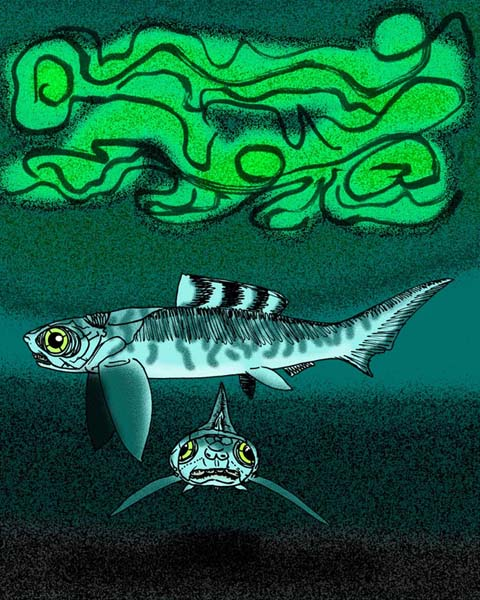
- Artist's reconstruction

Scientific classification
- Kingdom: Animalia
- Phylum: Chordata
- Class: †Placodermi
- Order: †Arthrodira
- Suborder: †Brachythoraci
- Family: †Selenosteidae
- Genus: †Pachyosteus; Jaekel, 1903

Species
- Pachyosteus bulla Jaekel, 1903 (type)

Synonyms
- Pachyosteus grossi Stensiö 1959

= Pachyosteus =

Pachyosteus Temporal range: Late Devonian, 382.7–359.3 Ma

Genus of fishes (fossil)

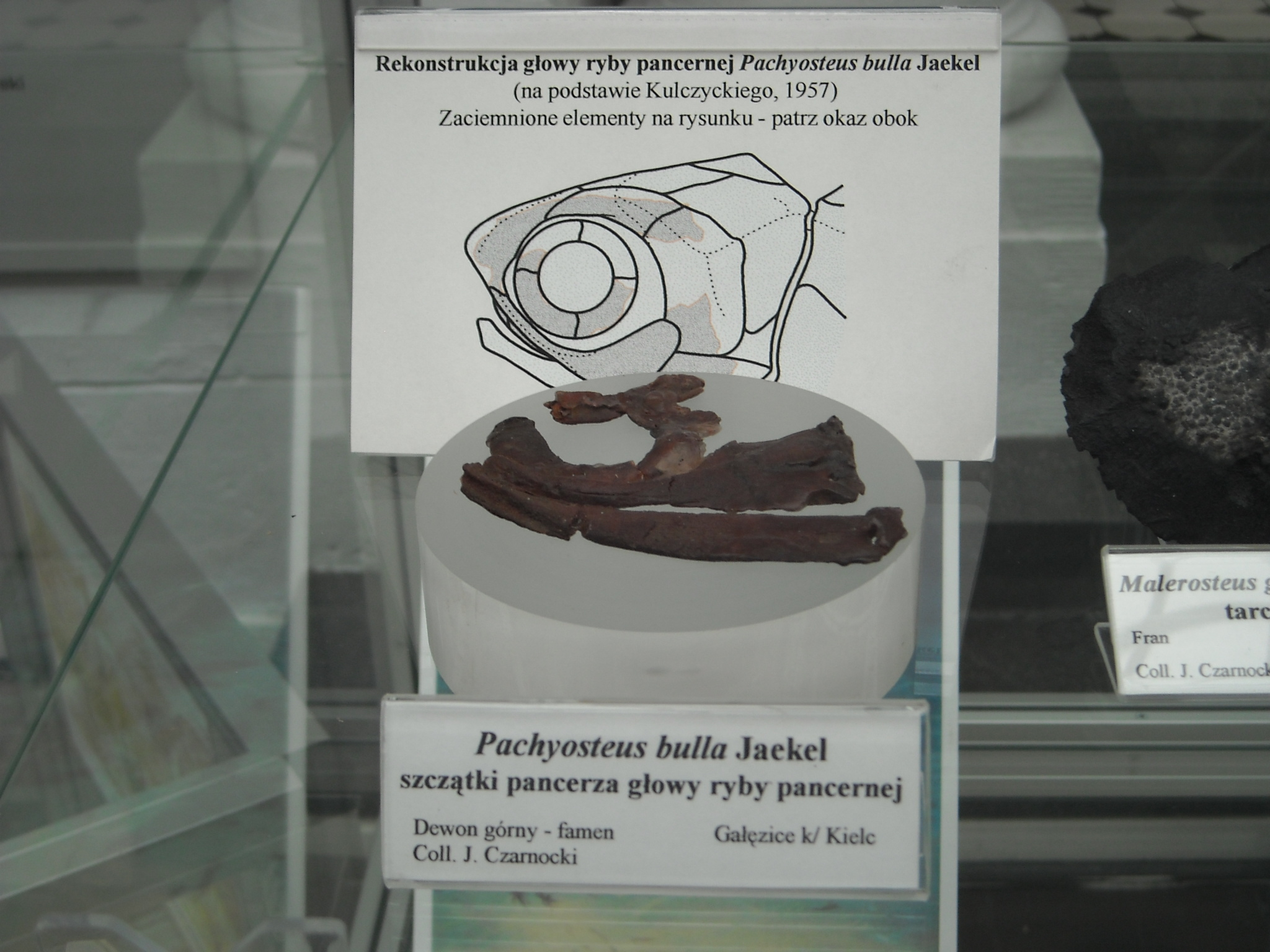
Fossil on display at Geological Museum of the State Geological Institute in Warsaw, Poland

Pachyosteus is an extinct monospecific genus of medium-sized selenosteid arthrodire placoderm known from the Upper Frasnian Kellwasserkalk facies of Late Devonian Bad Wildungen, Germany and from the Famennian portions of the Holy Cross Mountains of Poland. The type species Pachyosteus bulla has a broad skull about 7 to 10 centimetres (3 to 4 in) long, a comparatively long median dorsal plate, and a short rostral plate that meets the pineal plate.

== Phylogeny ==
Pachyosteus is a member of the family Selenosteidae of the clade Aspinothoracidi, which belongs to the clade Pachyosteomorphi, one of the two major clades within Eubrachythoraci. The cladogram below shows the phylogeny of Pachyosteus:

- Eubrachythoraci
  - Coccosteomorphi
  - Pachyosteomorphi
    - Rhachiosteus pterygiatus
    - - Dunkleosteoidea
        - Eastmanosteus calliaspis
        - - - Eastmanosteus pustulosus
            - Kiangyousteus yohii
          - - Golshanichthys asiatica
            - - Westralichthys uwagedensis
              - - - Dunkleosteus raveri
                  - Dunkleosteus terrelli
                - - Dunkleosteus amblyodoratus
                  - Heterostiidae
                    - Heterosteus ingens
                    - Yinosteus major
      - Aspinothoracidi
        - Tapinosteus heintzi
        - - - Bullerichthys fascidens
            - - Kendrickichthys cavernosus
              - Bruntonichthys multidens
          - - Dinichthys herzeri
            - - Hadrosteus rapax
              - - Gorgonichthys clarki
                - Selenosteidae
                  - Heintzichthys gouldii
                  - Pachyosteus bulla
                  - Gymnotrachelus hydei
                  - Stenosteus angustopectus
                  - Brachyosteus dietrichi
                  - - Melanosteus occitanus
                    - Rhinosteus parvulus

In his cladogram, Rücklin (2011) regards Pachyosteus bulla as a basal selenosteid, being the sister taxon of the American genera, and the Kellwasserkalk genera of Germany and Morocco.

- Aspinothoracidi
  - Parabelosteus
  - Brachydeirus
  - Selenosteidae
    - Pachyosteus
    - - - Selenosteus
        - - Stenosteus
          - Gymnotrachelus
      - - Microsteus
        - - Walterosteus
          - - Draconichthys
            - Enseosteus
            - - Melanosteus
              - Rhinosteus
