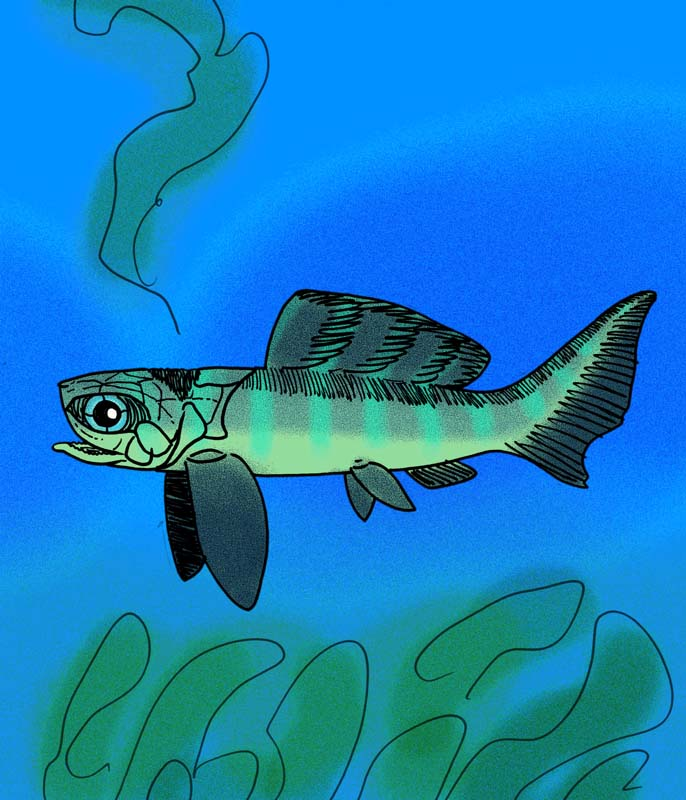
- Stenosteus angustopectus

Scientific classification
- Kingdom: Animalia
- Phylum: Chordata
- Class: †Placodermi
- Order: †Arthrodira
- Suborder: †Brachythoraci
- Family: †Selenosteidae
- Genus: †Stenosteus; Dean, 1901

Type species
- Stenosteus glaber Dean, 1901

Species
- S. glaber Dean, 1901; S. pertenius Branson, 1911; S. angustopectus Carr, 1996

= Stenosteus =

Stenosteus Temporal range: Late Devonian: Famennian, 371.1–359.3 Ma

Genus of fishes (fossil)

Stenosteus is an extinct monospecific genus of medium-sized selenosteid arthrodire placoderms of the Late Devonian period known from the Upper Famennian Cleveland Shale of Ohio. Estimated skull lengths range from 6 to 9 centimeters Most fossils of Stenosteus have been scraps of armor and portions of tooth-plates suggestive of Selenosteus. In 1996, enough material of a new species, S. angustopectus, was recovered to allow a reconstruction of armor that resembles that of Selenosteus.

== Phylogeny ==
Stenosteus is a member of the family Selenosteidae of the clade Aspinothoracidi, which belongs to the clade Pachyosteomorphi, one of the two major clades within Eubrachythoraci. The cladogram below shows the phylogeny of Stenosteus:

- Eubrachythoraci
  - Coccosteomorphi
  - Pachyosteomorphi
    - Rhachiosteus pterygiatus
    - - Dunkleosteoidea
        - Eastmanosteus calliaspis
        - - - Eastmanosteus pustulosus
            - Kiangyousteus yohii
          - - Golshanichthys asiatica
            - - Westralichthys uwagedensis
              - - - Dunkleosteus raveri
                  - Dunkleosteus terrelli
                - - Dunkleosteus amblyodoratus
                  - Heterostiidae
                    - Heterosteus ingens
                    - Yinosteus major
      - Aspinothoracidi
        - Tapinosteus heintzi
        - - - Bullerichthys fascidens
            - - Kendrickichthys cavernosus
              - Bruntonichthys multidens
          - - Dinichthys herzeri
            - - Hadrosteus rapax
              - - Gorgonichthys clarki
                - Selenosteidae
                  - Heintzichthys gouldii
                  - Pachyosteus bulla
                  - Gymnotrachelus hydei
                  - Stenosteus angustopectus
                  - Brachyosteus dietrichi
                  - - Melanosteus occitanus
                    - Rhinosteus parvulus
