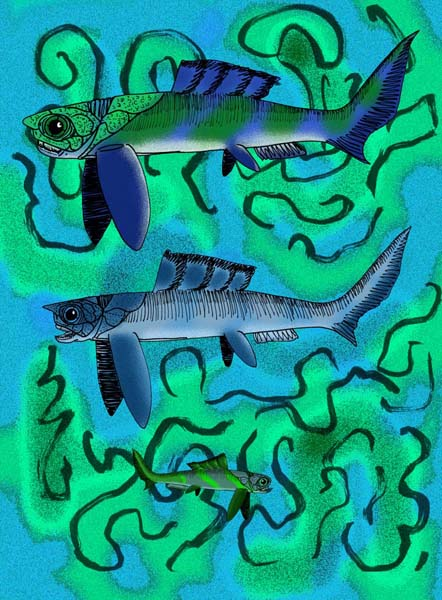
- R. tuberculatus, R. traquairi and R. parvulus

Scientific classification
- Kingdom: Animalia
- Phylum: Chordata
- Class: †Placodermi
- Order: †Arthrodira
- Suborder: †Brachythoraci
- Family: †Selenosteidae
- Genus: †Rhinosteus; Jaekel, 1911

Species
- Rhinosteus traquairi Jaekel, 1911 (type); Rhinosteus parvulus (Gross, 1932); Rhinosteus tuberculatus Gross, 1932

Synonyms
- Platyrhinosteus sp. Jaekel, 1929

= Rhinosteus =

Rhinosteus Temporal range: Late Devonian: Frasnian, 382.7–372.2 Ma

Genus of fishes (fossil)

Rhinosteus is an extinct genus of small to medium selenosteid arthrodire placoderms of the Late Devonian known from the Upper Frasnian Kellwasserkalk facies of Bad Wildungen, Germany and Morocco.

== Description ==
Rhinosteus is a typical genus of Kellwasserkalk selenosteids, with short cheeks, and slender inferognathal (lower jaw) plates. However, two of the species, R. traquairi and R. tuberculatus, have long, pointed rostrums, and tubercles on the plates. In R. traquairi, the rostrum is sharply pointed, extending beyond the snout, and the tubercles are small and irregularly placed. In R. tuberculatus, the rostrum is bluntly pointed, and the tubercles are large and plentiful. The species R. parvulus has a blunt rostrum that does not extend beyond the snout, and lacks tuberculation altogether. The average skull length of R. traquairi is about 11 centimetres. The average skull length of R. tuberculatus is 15 centimetres, while that of R. parvulus is 4 to 6 centimetres.

== Distribution ==
Fossils of R. traquairi and R. tuberculatus are found only in Bad Wildungen, Germany. R. parvulus is also found in Bad Wildungen. Rücklin (2011) discusses how specimens of small Rhinosteus have been found in the Kellwasserkalk facies of the Anti-Atlas Mountains of Morocco, and are tentatively referred to R. parvulus due primarily to their small size.

== Phylogeny ==
Rhinosteus is a member of the family Selenosteidae of the clade Aspinothoracidi, which belongs to the clade Pachyosteomorphi, one of the two major clades within Eubrachythoraci. The cladogram below shows the phylogeny of Rhinosteus:

- Eubrachythoraci
  - Coccosteomorphi
  - Pachyosteomorphi
    - Rhachiosteus pterygiatus
    - - Dunkleosteoidea
        - Eastmanosteus calliaspis
        - - - Eastmanosteus pustulosus
            - Kiangyousteus yohii
          - - Golshanichthys asiatica
            - - Westralichthys uwagedensis
              - - - Dunkleosteus raveri
                  - Dunkleosteus terrelli
                - - Dunkleosteus amblyodoratus
                  - Heterostiidae
                    - Heterosteus ingens
                    - Yinosteus major
      - Aspinothoracidi
        - Tapinosteus heintzi
        - - - Bullerichthys fascidens
            - - Kendrickichthys cavernosus
              - Bruntonichthys multidens
          - - Dinichthys herzeri
            - - Hadrosteus rapax
              - - Gorgonichthys clarki
                - Selenosteidae
                  - Heintzichthys gouldii
                  - Pachyosteus bulla
                  - Gymnotrachelus hydei
                  - Stenosteus angustopectus
                  - Brachyosteus dietrichi
                  - - Melanosteus occitanus
                    - Rhinosteus parvulus
