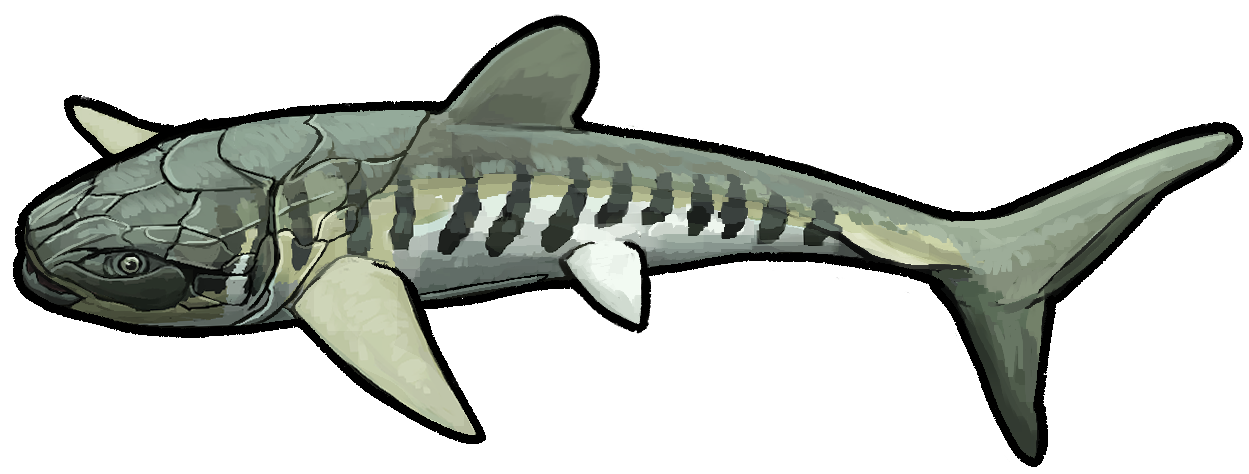
- Artist's reconstruction

Scientific classification
- Kingdom: Animalia
- Phylum: Chordata
- Class: †Placodermi
- Order: †Arthrodira
- Suborder: †Brachythoraci
- Family: †Selenosteidae
- Genus: †Gymnotrachelus; Dunkel & Bungart, 1939

Species
- Gymnotrachelus hydei Dunkle & Bungart, 1939 (type)

= Gymnotrachelus =

Gymnotrachelus Temporal range: Late Devonian: Famennian, 371.1–359.3 Ma

Genus of fishes (fossil)

Gymnotrachelus is an extinct monospecific genus of large selenosteid arthrodire placoderm of the Late Devonian known from the Late Famennian Cleveland Shale of Ohio. The type species is Gymnotrachelus hydei.

== Phylogeny ==
Gymnotrachelus is a member of the family Selenosteidae of the clade Aspinothoracidi, which belongs to the clade Pachyosteomorphi, one of the two major clades within Eubrachythoraci. The cladogram below shows the phylogeny of Gymnotrachelus:

- Eubrachythoraci
  - Coccosteomorphi
  - Pachyosteomorphi
    - Rhachiosteus pterygiatus
    - - Dunkleosteoidea
        - Eastmanosteus calliaspis
        - - - Eastmanosteus pustulosus
            - Kiangyousteus yohii
          - - Golshanichthys asiatica
            - - Westralichthys uwagedensis
              - - - Dunkleosteus raveri
                  - Dunkleosteus terrelli
                - - Dunkleosteus amblyodoratus
                  - Heterostiidae
                    - Heterosteus ingens
                    - Yinosteus major
      - Aspinothoracidi
        - Tapinosteus heintzi
        - - - Bullerichthys fascidens
            - - Kendrickichthys cavernosus
              - Bruntonichthys multidens
          - - Dinichthys herzeri
            - - Hadrosteus rapax
              - - Gorgonichthys clarki
                - Selenosteidae
                  - Heintzichthys gouldii
                  - Pachyosteus bulla
                  - Gymnotrachelus hydei
                  - Stenosteus angustopectus
                  - Brachyosteus dietrichi
                  - - Melanosteus occitanus
                    - Rhinosteus parvulus

According to a 2022 Jobbins et al. study, Gymnotrachelus was found to be an outgroup to Heintzichthys and Gorgonichthys.

- Gymnotrachelus
- - Gorgonichthys
  - Heintzichthys
