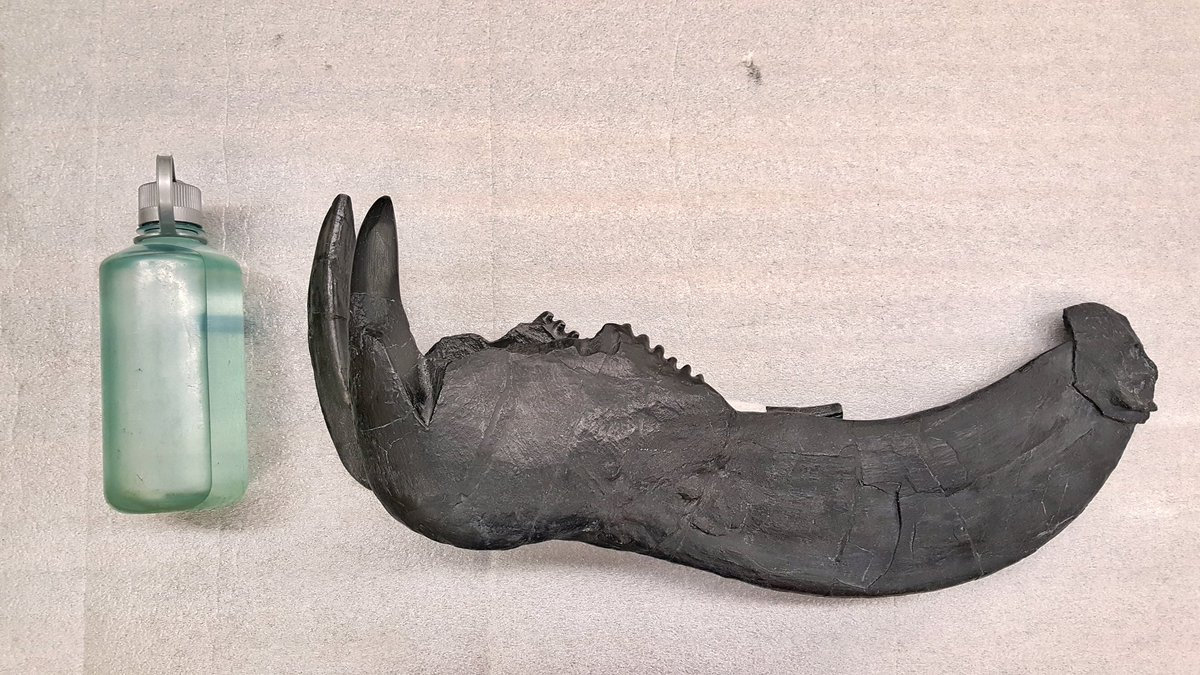
- The infragnathal (lower jaw) of Gorgonicthys with a 1-liter water bottle for scale. Bottle is approximately 23 cm (9.1 in) tall.
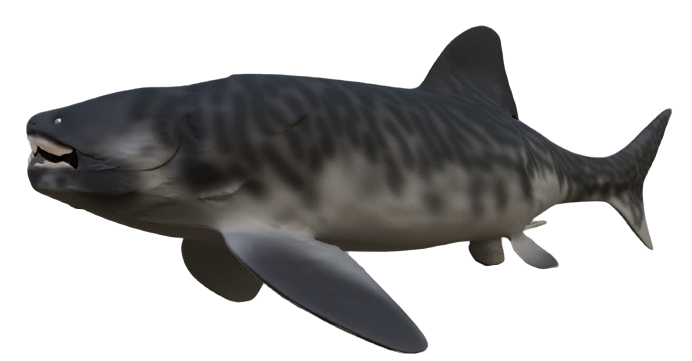
- Reconstruction of Gorgonichthys clarki

Scientific classification
- Kingdom: Animalia
- Phylum: Chordata
- Class: †Placodermi
- Order: †Arthrodira
- Suborder: †Brachythoraci
- Clade: †Eubrachythoraci
- Clade: †Pachyosteomorphi
- Clade: †Aspinothoracidi
- Genus: †Gorgonichthys; Claypole, 1892

Type species
- †Gorgonichthys clarki Claypole, 1892

= Gorgonichthys =

Gorgonichthys Temporal range: Late Devonian: Famennian, 371.1–359.3 Ma

Genus of fishes (fossil)

Gorgonichthys is extinct monospecific genus of large arthrodire placoderm. Fossils are found in the Upper Famennian Cleveland Shales of Late Devonian in Ohio. The type species is Gorgonichthys clarki.

== Description ==
Gorgonichthys clarki Claypole (CMNH. Cat. Fos. Fishes No. 5117). Disassociated right Postero-ventro-lateral, right Antero-ventro-lateral, right Antero-lateral, and left Postero-dorso-lateral: all in mesial view. Approx. x 1/9.

Gorgonichthys had sharp, pointed edges on the dental plates of the upper and lower jaws. With a headshield length of up to 70 cm (28 in), it is estimated to have been comparable to the size of Dunkleosteus.

== Phylogeny ==
Gorgonichthys is a member of the clade Aspinothoracidi, which belongs to the clade Pachyosteomorphi, one of the two major clades within Eubrachythoraci. It is closely related to the family Selenosteidae, and could possibly be included in that family. The cladogram below shows the phylogeny of Gorgonichthys:

- Eubrachythoraci
  - Coccosteomorphi
  - Pachyosteomorphi
    - Rhachiosteus pterygiatus
    - - Dunkleosteoidea
        - Eastmanosteus calliaspis
        - - - Eastmanosteus pustulosus
            - Kiangyousteus yohii
          - - Golshanichthys asiatica
            - - Westralichthys uwagedensis
              - - - Dunkleosteus raveri
                  - Dunkleosteus terrelli
                - - Dunkleosteus amblyodoratus
                  - Heterostiidae
                    - Heterosteus ingens
                    - Yinosteus major
      - Aspinothoracidi
        - Tapinosteus heintzi
        - - - Bullerichthys fascidens
            - - Kendrickichthys cavernosus
              - Bruntonichthys multidens
          - - Dinichthys herzeri
            - - Hadrosteus rapax
              - - Gorgonichthys clarki
                - Selenosteidae
                  - Heintzichthys gouldii
                  - Pachyosteus bulla
                  - Gymnotrachelus hydei
                  - Stenosteus angustopectus
                  - Brachyosteus dietrichi
                  - - Melanosteus occitanus
                    - Rhinosteus parvulus

According to a 2022 Jobbins et al. study, Gorgonichthys was found to be more related to Heintzichthys than Gymnotrachelus, potentially making Gorgonichthys a member of Selenosteidae.

- - Gymnotrachelus
  - - Gorgonichthys
    - Heintzichthys
