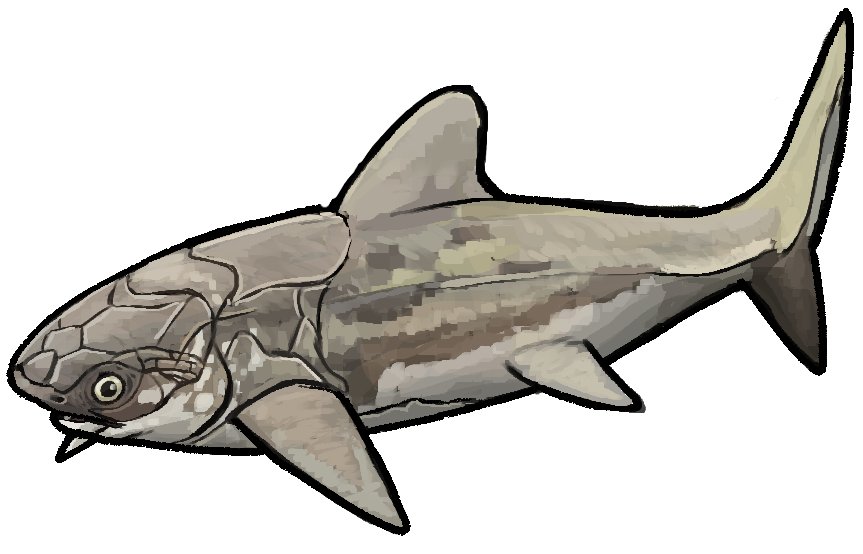

Scientific classification
- Kingdom: Animalia
- Phylum: Chordata
- Class: †Placodermi
- Order: †Arthrodira
- Suborder: †Brachythoraci
- Family: †Selenosteidae
- Genus: †Heintzichthys; Whitley 1933

Species
- Heintzichthys gouldii (Newberry, 1885) (type)

Synonyms
- Dinichthys corrugatus (Newberry, 1893); Dinichthys gracilis (Claypole, 1897); Stenognathus corrugatus (Newberry, 1889)

= Heintzichthys =

Heintzichthys Temporal range: Late Devonian: Famennian, 371.1–359.3 Ma

Genus of fishes (fossil)

Heintzichthys is an extinct monospecific genus of arthrodire placoderm that lived what is now Europe and North America during the Famennian stage of the Late Devonian period. The type specimen was discovered in the Cleveland Shale near Cleveland, Ohio, in the United States.

== Phylogeny ==
Heintzichthys is a member of the family Selenosteidae of the clade Aspinothoracidi, which belongs to the clade Pachyosteomorphi, one of the two major clades within Eubrachythoraci. The cladogram below shows the phylogeny of Heintzichthys:

- Eubrachythoraci
  - Coccosteomorphi
  - Pachyosteomorphi
    - Rhachiosteus pterygiatus
    - - Dunkleosteoidea
        - Eastmanosteus calliaspis
        - - - Eastmanosteus pustulosus
            - Kiangyousteus yohii
          - - Golshanichthys asiatica
            - - Westralichthys uwagedensis
              - - - Dunkleosteus raveri
                  - Dunkleosteus terrelli
                - - Dunkleosteus amblyodoratus
                  - Heterostiidae
                    - Heterosteus ingens
                    - Yinosteus major
      - Aspinothoracidi
        - Tapinosteus heintzi
        - - - Bullerichthys fascidens
            - - Kendrickichthys cavernosus
              - Bruntonichthys multidens
          - - Dinichthys herzeri
            - - Hadrosteus rapax
              - - Gorgonichthys clarki
                - Selenosteidae
                  - Heintzichthys gouldii
                  - Pachyosteus bulla
                  - Gymnotrachelus hydei
                  - Stenosteus angustopectus
                  - Brachyosteus dietrichi
                  - - Melanosteus occitanus
                    - Rhinosteus parvulus

According to a 2022 Jobbins et al. study, Heintzichthys was found to be a sister taxa to Gorgonichthys.

- Gymnotrachelus
- - Gorgonichthys
  - Heintzichthys
