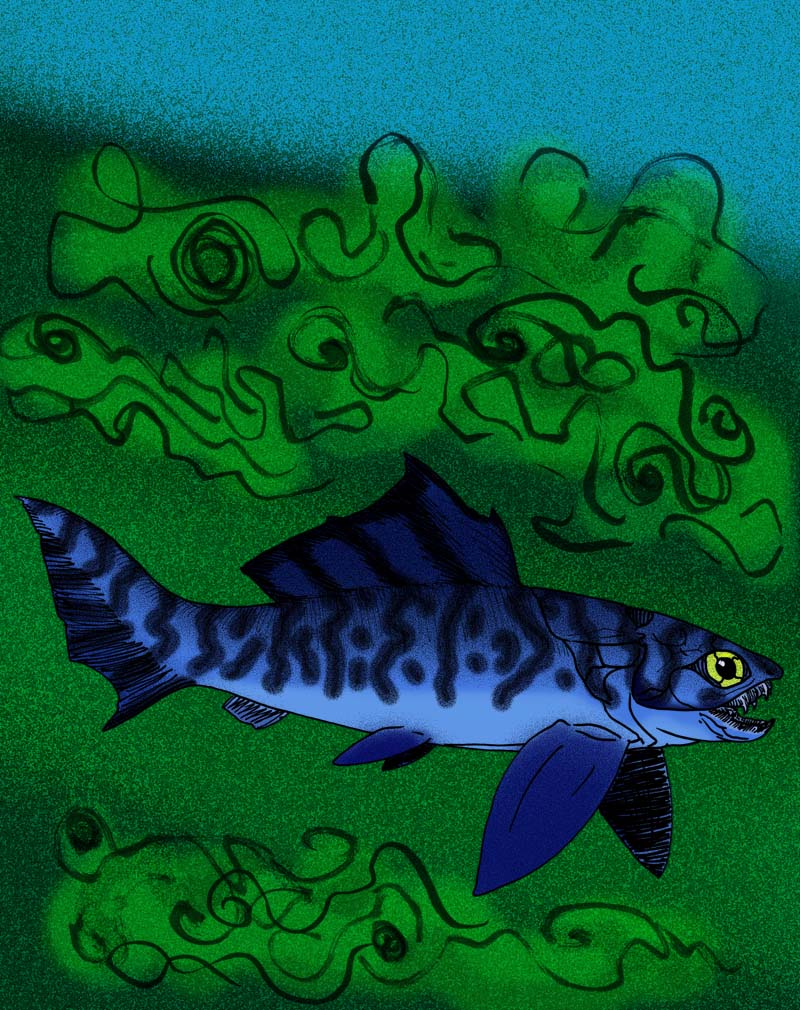
- typical aspinothoracid, Hadrosteus

Scientific classification
- Kingdom: Animalia
- Phylum: Chordata
- Class: †Placodermi
- Order: †Arthrodira
- Suborder: †Brachythoraci
- Clade: †Pachyosteomorphi
- Clade: †Aspinothoracidi; Stensiö, 1959

Subgroups
- Tapinosteus; Bullerichthys; Kendrickichthys; Bruntonichthys; Dinichthys; Hadrosteus; Gorgonichthys; Selenosteidae

= Aspinothoracidi =

Aspinothoracidi Temporal range: Late Devonian, ~382.7–372.2 Ma

Extinct clade of fishes

Aspinothoracidi is a clade of placoderms, extinct armored fish most diverse during the Devonian. The gigantic apex predator Dinichthys, is the best-known member of this group. Many other genera, such as the infamous Dunkleosteus, were previously thought to be close relatives of Dinichthys and were grouped together in the family Dinichthyidae, though more recent studies have restricted that family to only its type species.

== Phylogeny ==
Eubrachythoraci is divided into the clades Coccosteomorphi and Pachyosteomorphi, the latter of which can be further sub-divided into Aspinothoracidi and Dunkleosteoidea, as shown in the cladogram below:

- Eubrachythoraci
  - Coccosteomorphi
    - Coccosteoidea
      - Coccosteidae
        - - Millerosteus minor
          - Coccosteus cuspidatus
        - - Dickosteus threiplandi
          - Watsonosteus fletti
          - Protitanichthys rockportensis
      - Panxiosteidae
        - Plourdosteus canadensis
        - Panxiosteus ocullus
        - Janiosteus timanicus
    - Incisoscutoidea
      - Harrytoombsia elegans
      - - Torosteus tuberculatus
        - Torosteus pulchellus
      - - Mcnamaraspis kaprios
        - - Compagopiscis croucheri
          - Trematosteus fontanellus
          - Camuropiscidae
            - - Incisoscutum ritchiei
              - Incisoscutum sarahae
            - - Rolfosteus canningensis
              - - Tubonasus lennardensis
                - - Fallacosteus turneri
                  - - Camuropiscis laidlawi
                    - Latocamurus coulthardi
  - Pachyosteomorphi
    - Rhachiosteus pterygiatus
    - - Dunkleosteoidea
        - Eastmanosteus calliaspis
        - - - Eastmanosteus pustulosus
            - Kiangyousteus yohii
          - - Golshanichthys asiatica
            - - Westralichthys uwagedensis
              - - - Dunkleosteus raveri
                  - Dunkleosteus terrelli
                - - Dunkleosteus amblyodoratus
                  - Heterostiidae
                    - Heterosteus ingens
                    - Yinosteus major
      - Aspinothoracidi
        - Tapinosteus heintzi
        - - - Bullerichthys fascidens
            - - Kendrickichthys cavernosus
              - Bruntonichthys multidens
          - - Dinichthys herzeri
            - - Hadrosteus rapax
              - - Gorgonichthys clarki
                - Selenosteidae
                  - Heintzichthys gouldii
                  - Pachyosteus bulla
                  - Gymnotrachelus hydei
                  - Stenosteus angustopectus
                  - Brachyosteus dietrichi
                  - - Melanosteus occitanus
                    - Rhinosteus parvulus
