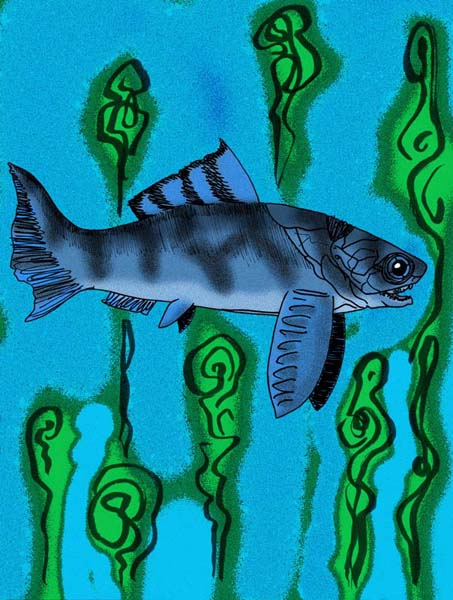
- Life restoration of Melanomontanosteus occitanus

Scientific classification
- Kingdom: Animalia
- Phylum: Chordata
- Class: †Placodermi
- Order: †Arthrodira
- Suborder: †Brachythoraci
- Family: †Selenosteidae
- Genus: †Melanomontanosteus Prokofiev, 2023

Type species
- †Melanomontanosteus occitanus (Lelièvre & Goujet in Lelièvre, Feist, Goujet, & Blieck, 1987)

Synonyms
- Genus synonymy: Melanosteus Lelièvre & Goujet in Lelièvre, Feist, Goujet, & Blieck, 1987 (preoccupied by Melanosteus Eisenack, 1942); Species synonymy: Melanosteus occitanus Lelièvre & Goujet in Lelièvre, Feist, Goujet, & Blieck, 1987

= Melanosteus =

Melanomontanosteus Temporal range: Late Devonian

Genus of extinct fishes

Melanomontanosteus is an extinct genus of selenosteid placoderm that lived during the Late Devonian. It contains one valid species, M. occitanus, known from fossils found in Southern France.

== Taxonomy ==
Melanosteus occitanus was named by Hervé Lelièvre and Daniel Goujet in 1987 for a specimen from Montagne Noire consisting of the jaws and the cranial and thoracic armor. However, that genus name was preoccupied by the melanosclerite Melanosteus. In 2023, Artem M. Prokofiev proposed Melanomontanosteus as a replacement name.

== Phylogeny ==
Melanomontanosteus has been classified as a member of the family Selenosteidae since its original description. Below is a simplified cladogram based on the results of Jobbins et al. (2022).

- Brachythoraci
  - Holonematidae
  - - Homostiidae
    - - Buchanosteidae
      - Eubrachythoraci
        - - Coccosteomorphi
        - Pachyosteomorphi
          - Eastmanosteus
          - - - Dunkleosteoidea
            - Aspinothoracidi
              - Stenosteus
              - Selenosteidae
                - - Gymnotrachelus
                  - - Gorgonichthys
                    - Heintzichthys
                - - Driscollaspis
                  - - Rhinosteus
                    - Selenosteus
                    - - Amazichthys
                      - - Melanomontanosteus
                        - - Draconichthys
                          - - Enseosteus
                            - Walterosteus
