= Golshanichthys =

Golshanichthys Temporal range: Late Devonian: Frasnian, 382.7–372.2 Ma

Scientific classification
- Kingdom: Animalia
- Phylum: Chordata
- Class: †Placodermi
- Order: †Arthrodira
- Suborder: †Brachythoraci
- Family: †Dunkleosteidae
- Genus: †Golshanichthys; Lelièvre et al., 1981

Type species
- Golshanichthys asiatica Lelièvre et al., 1981

Extinct genus of fishes

Golshanichthys is an extinct monospecific genus of dunkleosteid from the Late Devonian: Frasnian stage from Kerman, Iran.

== Phylogeny ==
Golshanichthys belongs to the family Dunkleosteidae, closely related to the giant Dunkleosteus. The phylogeny of Golshanichthys can be shown in the cladogram below:

- Dunkleosteoidea
  - Westralichthys uwagedensis
  - - - Protitanichthys rockportensis
      - Panxiosteidae
        - Panxiosteus ocullus
        - Janiosteus timanicus
        - Plourdosteus canadensis
    - Dunkleosteidae
      - - Eastmanosteus calliaspis
        - Xiangshuiosteus wui
      - - Eastmanosteus pustulosus
        - Kiangyousteus yohii
        - Golshanichthys asiatica
        - - Dunkleosteus amblyodoratus
          - Dunkleosteus terrelli
          - Dunkleosteus raveri

Alternatively, the subsequent 2016 Zhu et al. study using a larger morphological dataset recovered Panxiosteidae well outside of Dunkleosteoidea, leaving the status of Dunkleosteidae as a clade grouping separate from Dunkleosteoidea in doubt, as shown in the cladogram below:

- Dunkleosteoidea
  - Eastmanosteus calliaspis
  - - - Eastmanosteus pustulosus
      - Kiangyousteus yohii
    - - Golshanichthys asiatica
      - - Westralichthys uwagedensis
        - - - Dunkleosteus raveri
            - Dunkleosteus terrelli
          - - Dunkleosteus amblyodoratus
            - Heterostiidae
              - Heterosteus ingens
              - Yinosteus major
