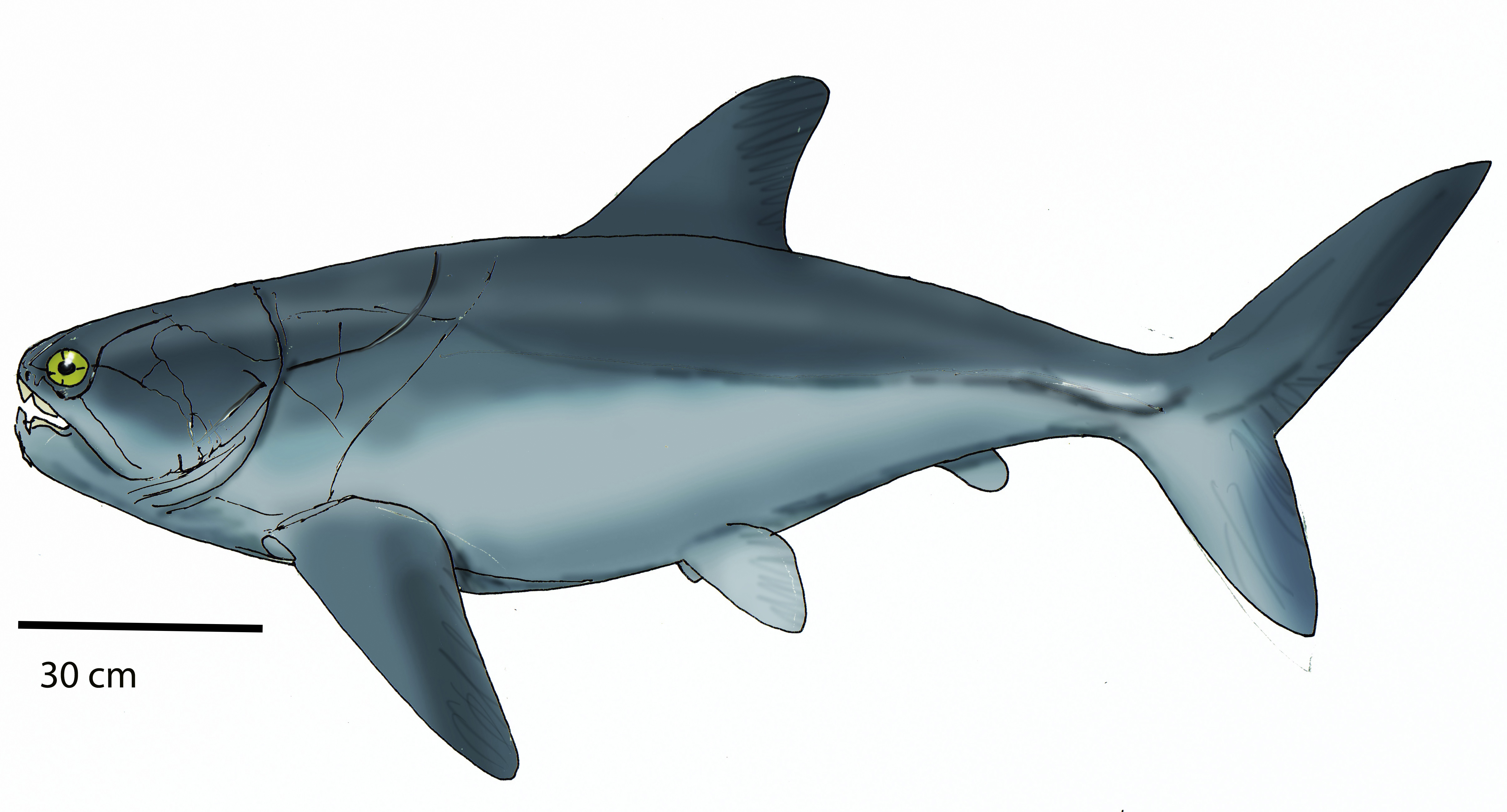
- Life restoration

Scientific classification
- Kingdom: Animalia
- Phylum: Chordata
- Class: †Placodermi
- Order: †Arthrodira
- Suborder: †Brachythoraci
- Clade: †Eubrachythoraci
- Clade: †Pachyosteomorphi
- Superfamily: †Dunkleosteoidea
- Genus: †Westralichthys; Long, 1987

Type species
- Westralichthys uwagedensis Long, 1987

= Westralichthys =

Westralichthys Temporal range: Late Devonian: Middle Famennian, 371.1–359.3 Ma

Extinct genus of fishes

Westralichthys is an extinct monospecific genus of dunkleosteoid from the Late Devonian, Middle Famennian stage from the Virgin Hills Formation, Western Australia. Known from only a single skull, WAM 86.9.664, It is estimated to be 3 meters (9.8 ft) long. The name refers to the state of Western Australia, with ichthys meaning fish.

== Phylogeny ==
Westralichthys belongs to the superfamily Dunkleosteoidea, related to the giant Dunkleosteus. The phylogeny of Westralichthys can be shown in the cladogram below:

- Dunkleosteoidea
  - Eastmanosteus calliaspis
  - - - Eastmanosteus pustulosus
      - Kiangyousteus yohii
    - - Golshanichthys asiatica
      - - Westralichthys uwagedensis
        - - - Dunkleosteus raveri
            - Dunkleosteus terrelli
          - - Dunkleosteus amblyodoratus
            - Heterostiidae
              - Heterosteus ingens
              - Yinosteus major
