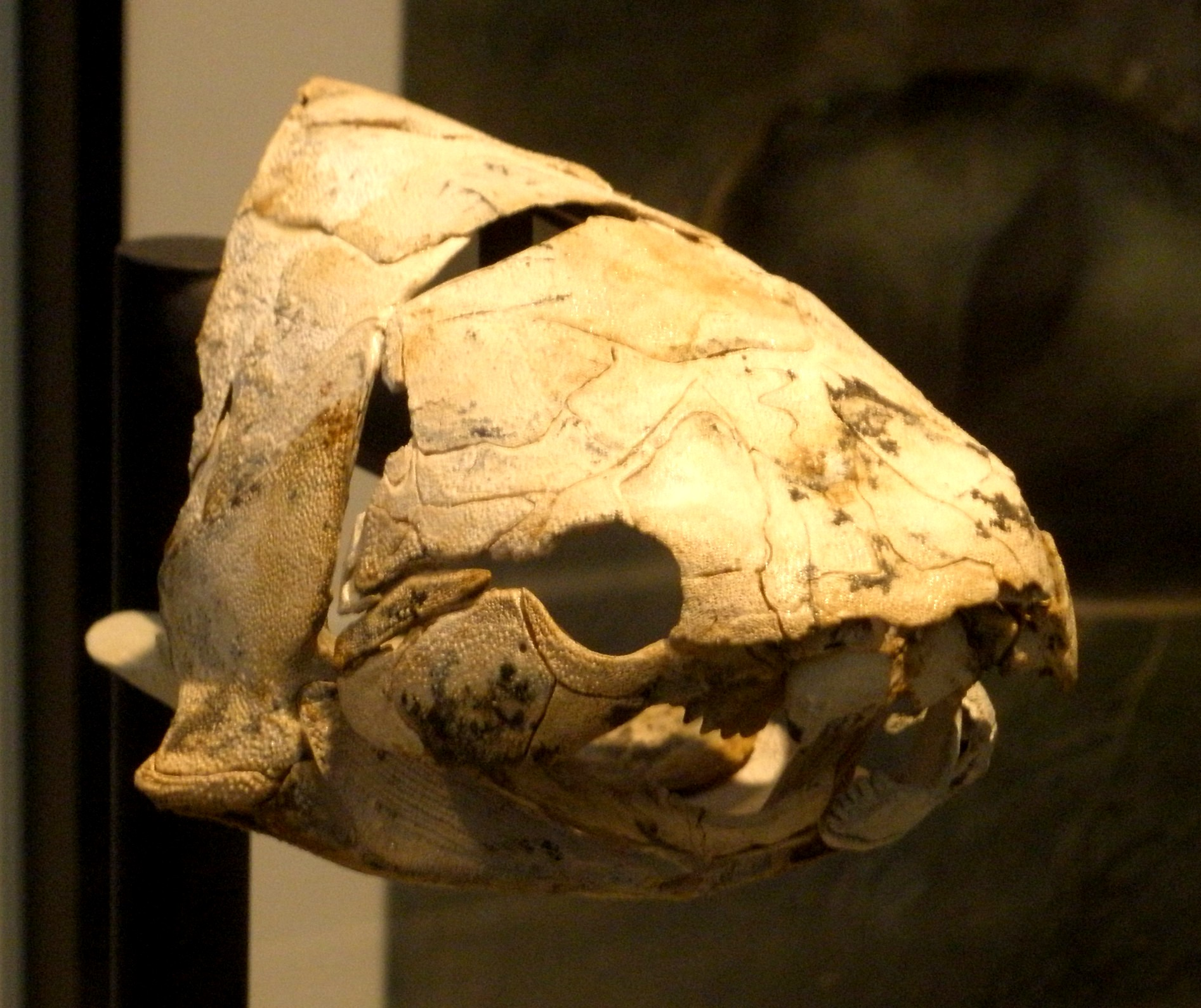
- E. calliaspis skull on display at the American Museum of Natural History in New York City
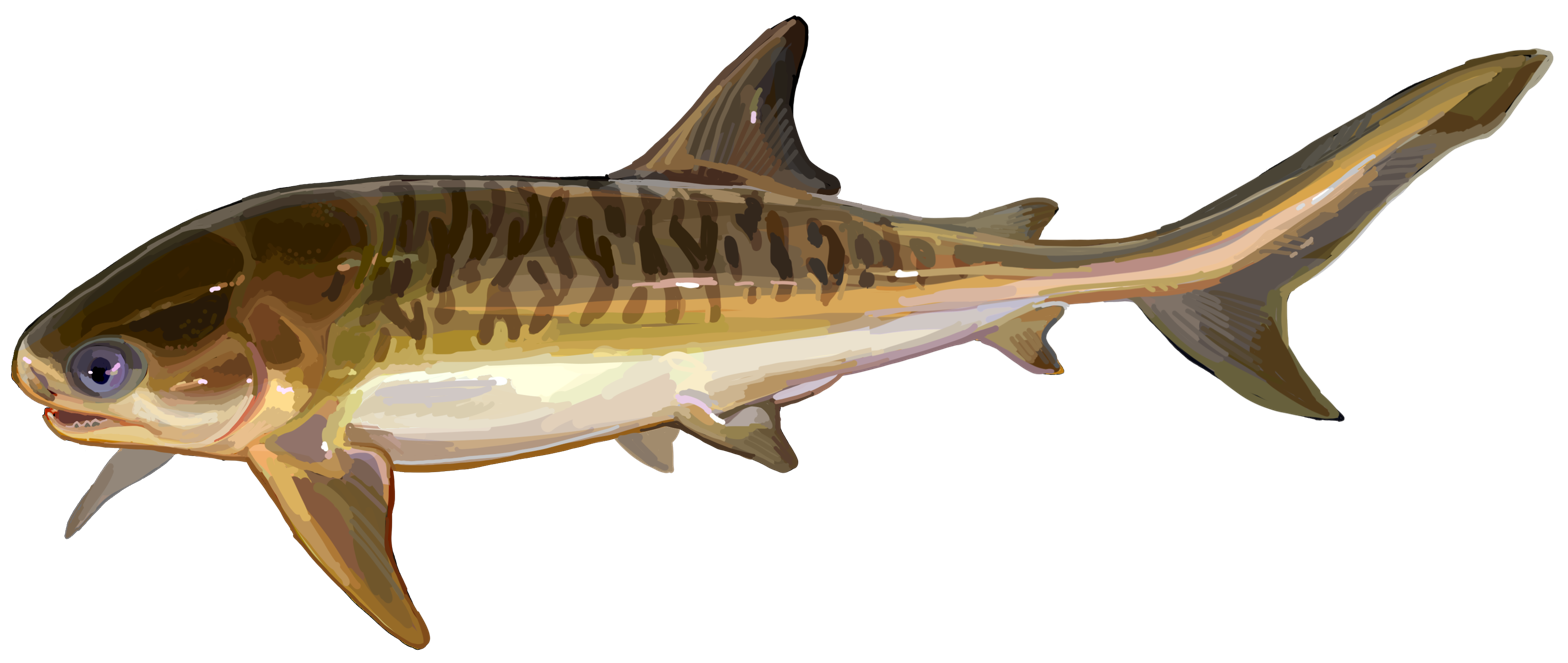
- Artist's reconstruction of E. calliaspis

Scientific classification
- Kingdom: Animalia
- Phylum: Chordata
- Class: †Placodermi
- Order: †Arthrodira
- Suborder: †Brachythoraci
- Family: †Dunkleosteidae
- Genus: †Eastmanosteus; Obruchev, 1964

Type species
- Dinichthys pustulosus (Eastman, 1897)

Species
- E. calliaspis Dennis-Bryan, 1987; E. licharevi (Obruchev, 1956); E. lundarensis Hanke, Stewart and Lammers, 1996; E. magnificus (Hussakof & Bryant, 1918); E. yunnanensis (Wang, 1982)

= Eastmanosteus =

Eastmanosteus Temporal range: Middle Devonian–Late Devonian

Extinct genus of placoderm fish

Eastmanosteus ("Eastman's bone") is a fossil genus of dunkleosteid placoderms. It was closely related to the giant Dunkleosteus, but differed from that genus in size and in possessing a distinctive tuberculated bone ornament, a differently shaped nuchal plate, and a more zig-zagging course of the sutures of the skull roof.

Species of Eastmanosteus had powerful jaws with sharp cutting edges and were likely active predators. Fossils have been found in many parts of the world in marine sediments dating from the Middle to Late Devonian. They were medium-to-large fish, with specimens E. pustulosus and E. licharevi approaching a total length of 3 metres (10 feet). Complete exoskeletons with soft-tissue traces of E. calliaspis from Australia make this one of the best known dunkleosteids.

== Phylogeny ==
Eastmanosteus and its relative Dunkleosteus belong to the family Dunkleosteidae. The phylogeny of Eastmanosteus can be shown in the cladogram below:

- Dunkleosteoidea
  - Westralichthys uwagedensis
  - - - Protitanichthys rockportensis
      - Panxiosteidae
        - Panxiosteus ocullus
        - Janiosteus timanicus
        - Plourdosteus canadensis
    - Dunkleosteidae
      - - Eastmanosteus calliaspis
        - Xiangshuiosteus wui
      - - Eastmanosteus pustulosus
        - Kiangyousteus yohii
        - Golshanichthys asiatica
        - - Dunkleosteus amblyodoratus
          - Dunkleosteus terrelli
          - Dunkleosteus raveri

Alternatively, the subsequent 2016 Zhu et al. study using a larger morphological dataset recovered Panxiosteidae well outside of Dunkleosteoidea, leaving the status of Dunkleosteidae as a clade grouping separate from Dunkleosteoidea in doubt, as shown in the cladogram below:

- Dunkleosteoidea
  - Eastmanosteus calliaspis
  - - - Eastmanosteus pustulosus
      - Kiangyousteus yohii
    - - Golshanichthys asiatica
      - - Westralichthys uwagedensis
        - - - Dunkleosteus raveri
            - Dunkleosteus terrelli
          - - Dunkleosteus amblyodoratus
            - Heterostiidae
              - Heterosteus ingens
              - Yinosteus major

== Species ==
=== Eastmanosteus calliaspis Dennis-Bryan, 1987 ===
From the Frasnian Gogo Formation of northwestern Western Australia. This is the best-known species of the genus, with many articulated skulls and trunk armours in museum collections. Evidence of muscle fibres, circulatory structures, and nerve tissue have been preserved, representing some of the oldest known gnathostome soft tissue. The largest known skull is 272 millimetres (10.7 inches) in length, suggesting a total body length of roughly 1.5 metres (5 feet). It was one of the largest fish in the Gogo assemblage. A reexamination of dunkleosteids posits the Late Emsian Xiangshuiosteus as E. calliaspis' sister taxon, and further implicates that E. calliaspis differs enough from other species of this genus to merit placement in its own genus.

E. calliaspis (AMNH 19499)
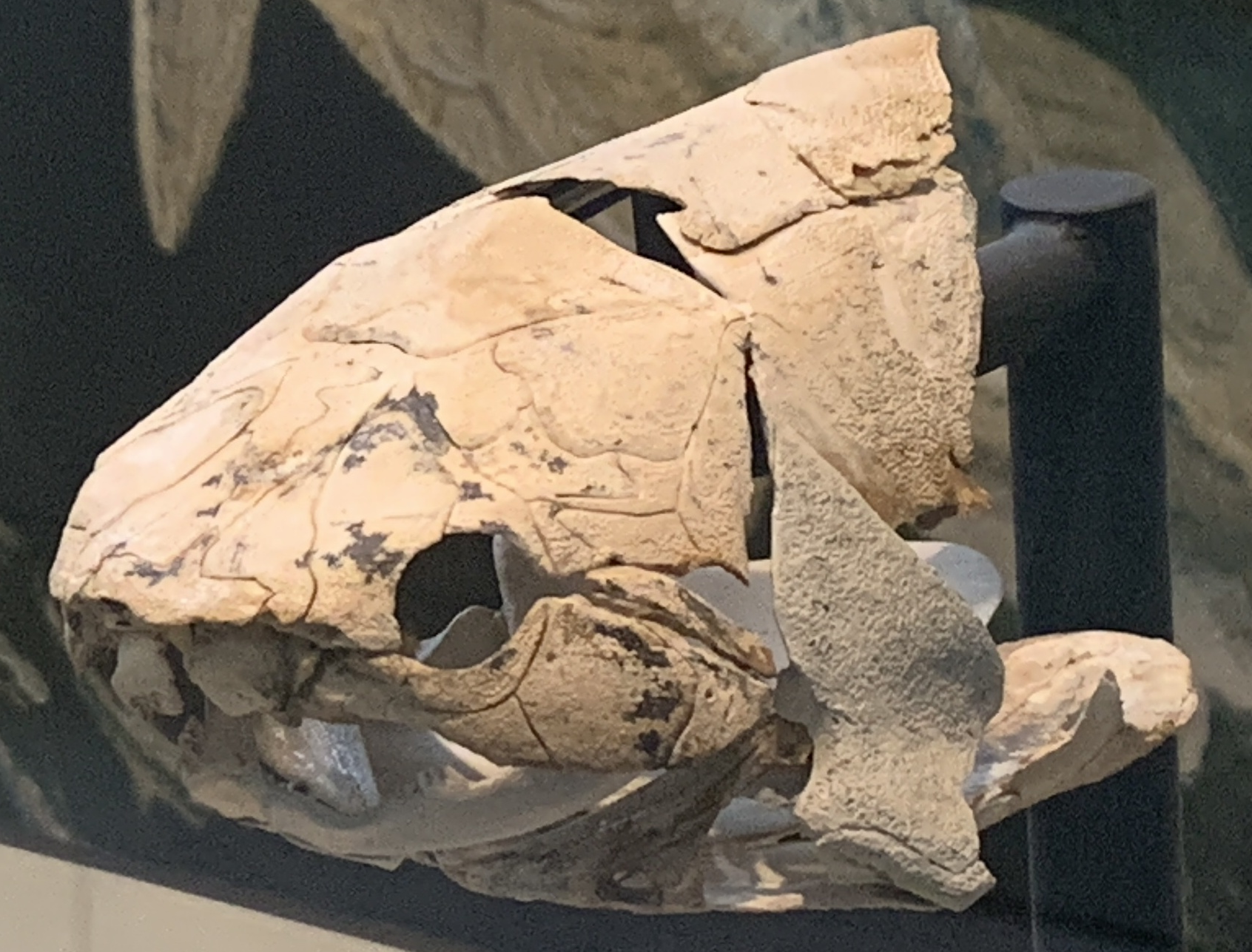
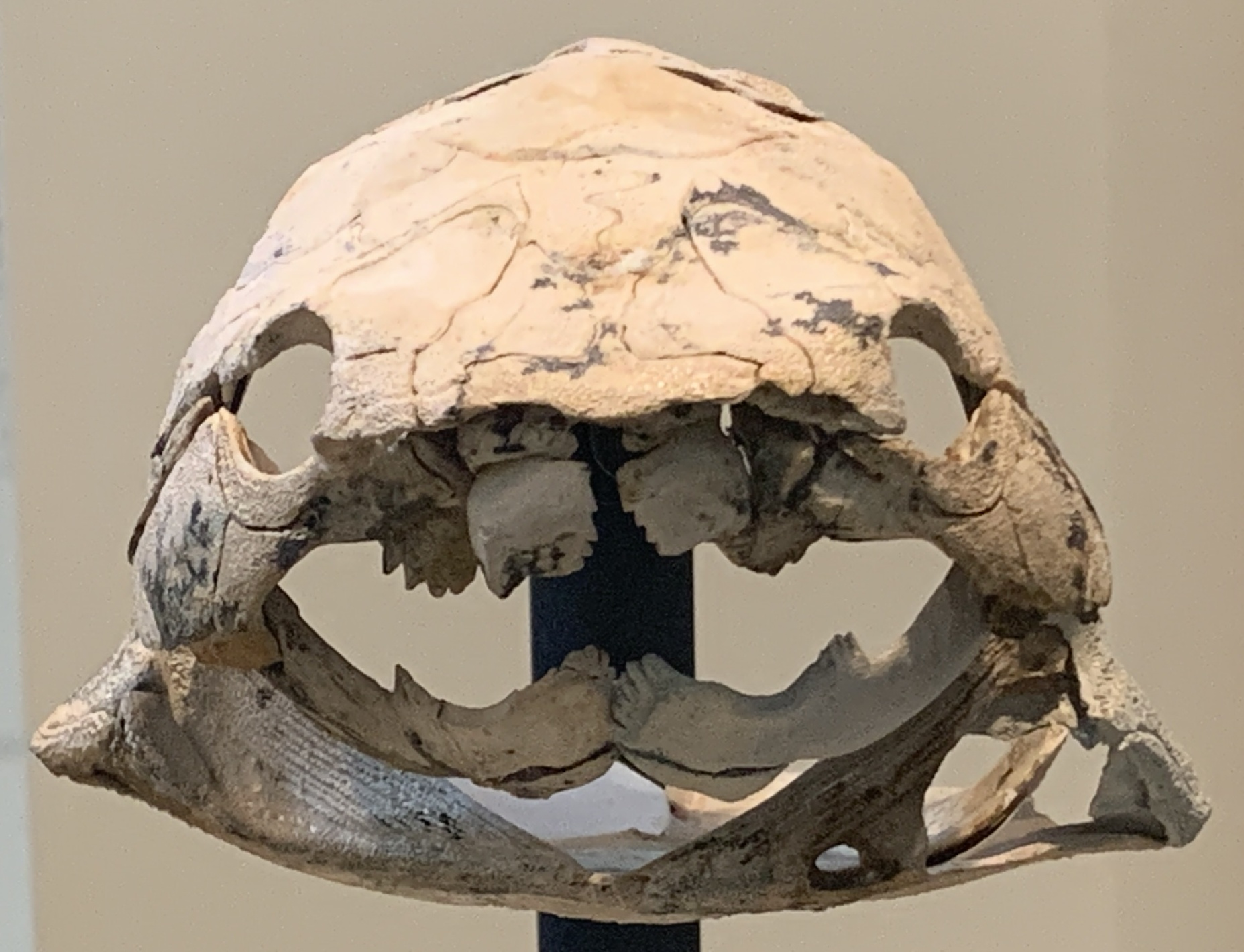
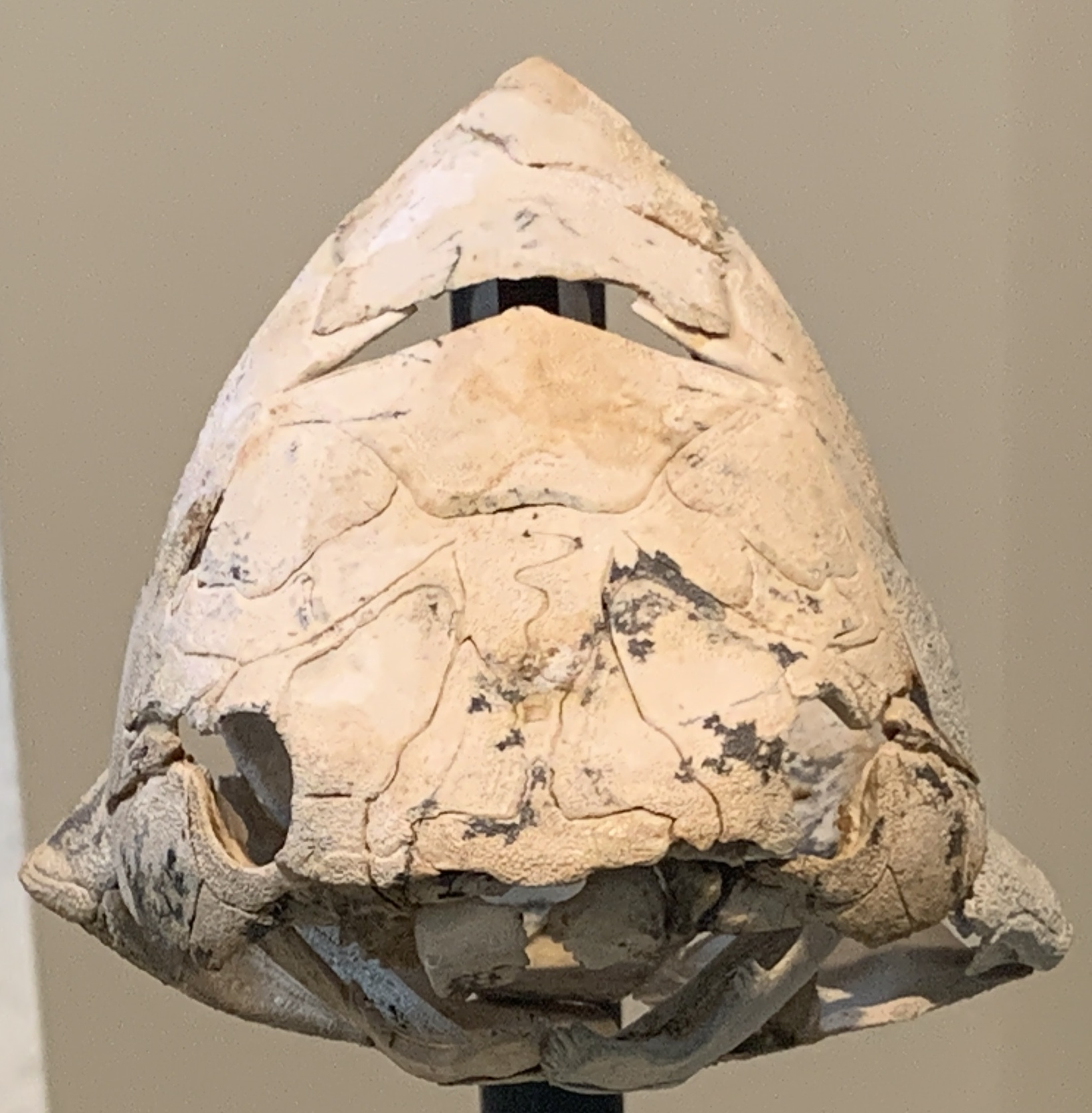
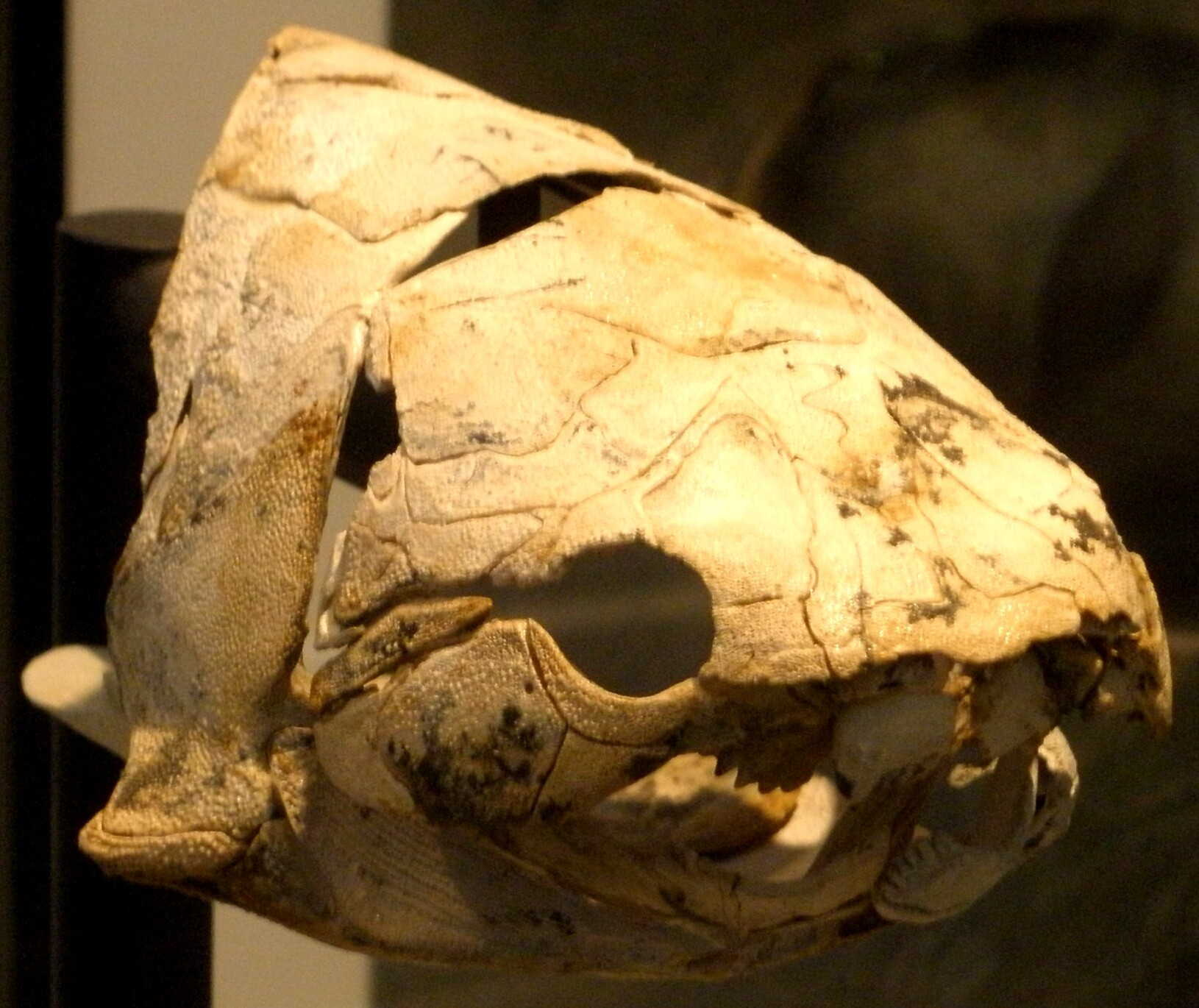

=== E. licharevi (Obrucheva, 1956) ===
A poorly known species from Russia, originally described from an isolated nuchal plate from the Frasnian of Timman with additional material from the Famennian of Lipetsk.

=== E. lundarensis Hanke, Stewart and Lammers, 1996 ===
A medium-sized species from the Eifelian of south-central Manitoba, Canada. One of the earliest and most completely known members of the genus.

=== E. magnificus (Hussakof & Bryant, 1918) ===
Based on a single, almost complete head shield from the Late Devonian of New York state in the United States. Has previously been assigned to Dinichthys and Dunkleosteus.

=== E. pustulosus (Eastman, 1897) ===
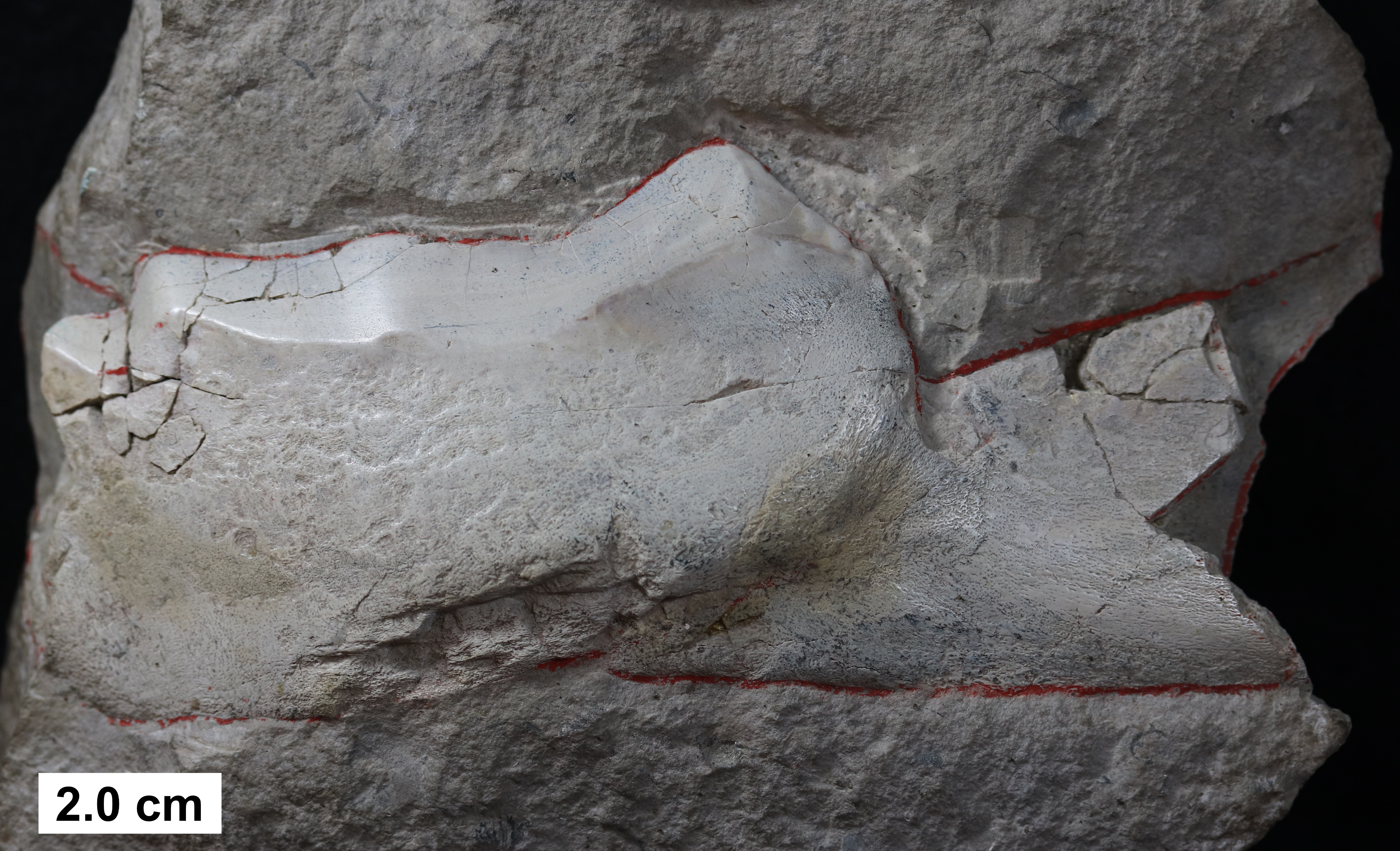
E. pustulosus IG plate (lower jaw) from the type locality in Milwaukee County, Wisconsin.

This is the type species and originally was placed in the genus Dinichthys. It was a large and widely distributed form, with fossil material from the Middle-Late Devonian of the United Stastes (Wisconsin, Iowa, Michigan, New York state) and the Frasnian of Poland.

=== E. yunnanensis (Wang, 1982) ===
Originally assigned to Dunkleosteus. From the Middle Devonian of Yunnan Province, China.

=== Eastmanosteus species 1 Janvier ===
An undescribed species based on relatively well-preserved material from the Frasnian of Kerman, east Iran.

=== Other species ===
Many other species have been included within this genus based on material from Russia, Morocco, and the United States. Most of these are either indeterminate dinichthyids or are now placed in different genera.
