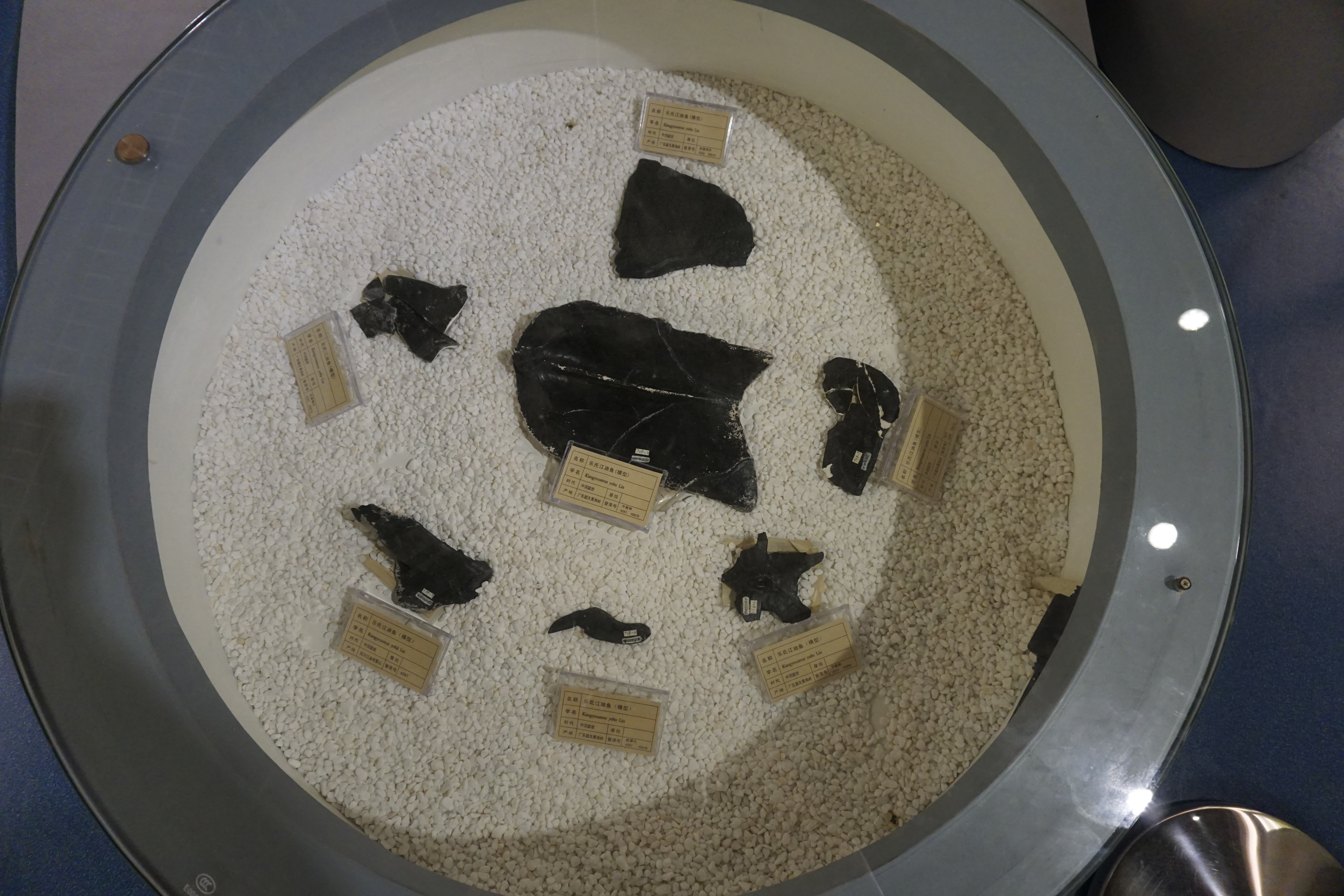
- Kiangyouosteus yohii fossil material

Scientific classification
- Kingdom: Animalia
- Phylum: Chordata
- Class: †Placodermi
- Order: †Arthrodira
- Suborder: †Brachythoraci
- Family: †Dunkleosteidae
- Genus: †Kiangyousteus; Liu, 1955

Type species
- Kiangyousteus yohii Liu, 1955

= Kiangyousteus =

Kiangyousteus Temporal range: Middle Devonian: Givetian, 387.7–382.7 Ma

Extinct genus of fishes

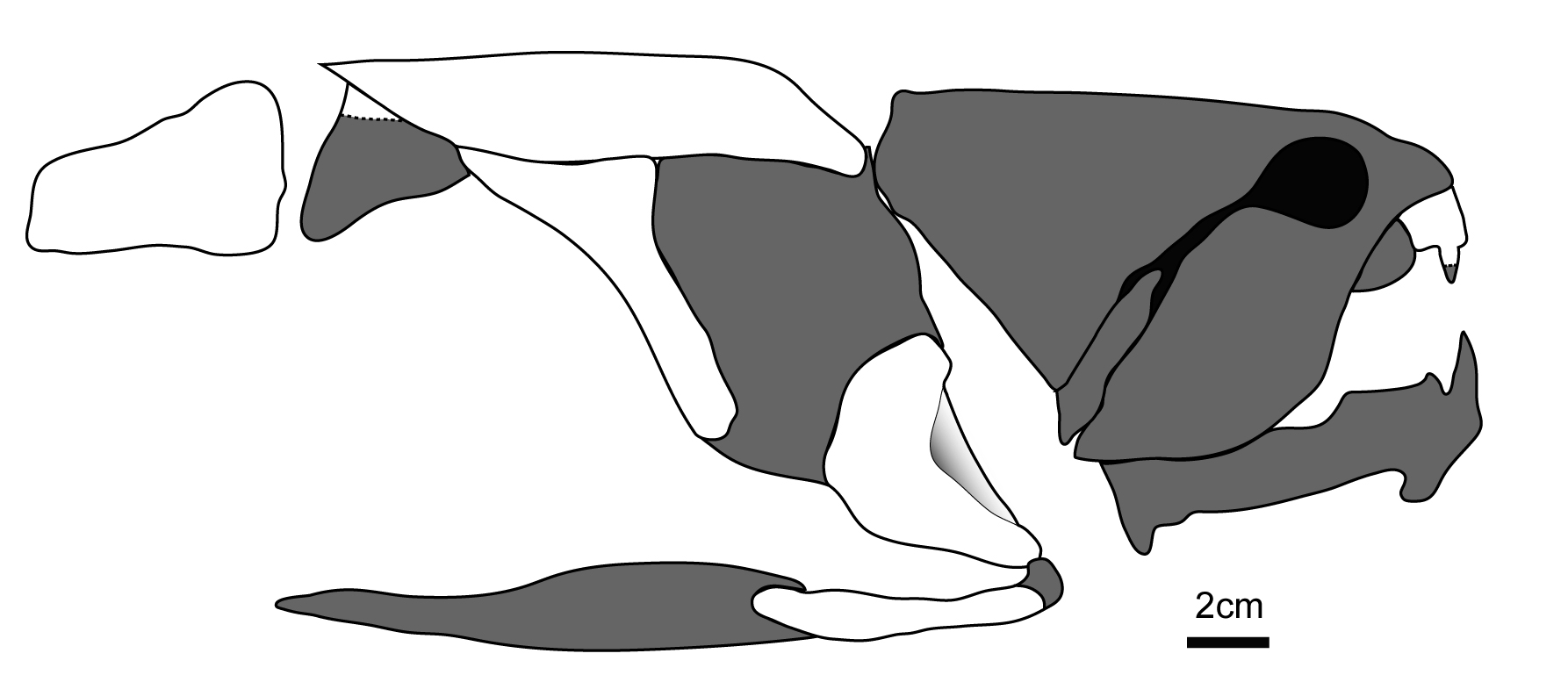
Known remains in white

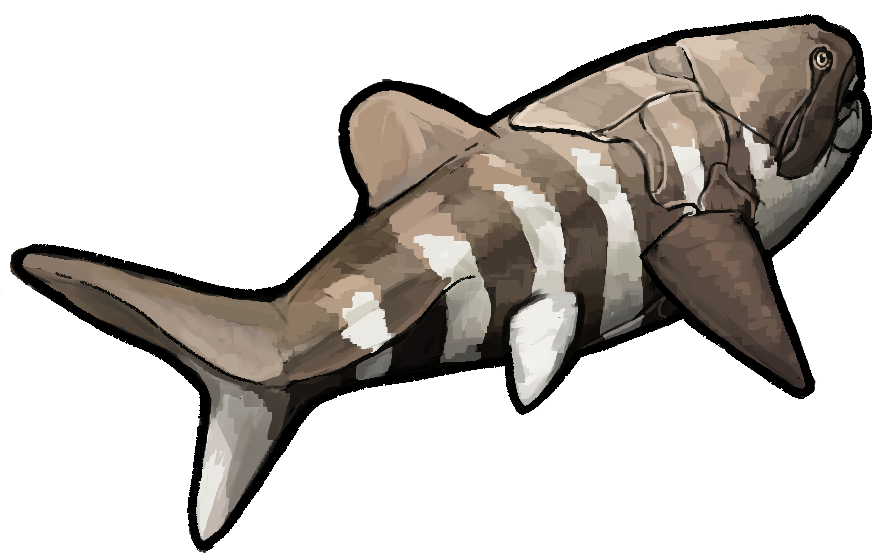
Life Restoration

Kiangyousteus is an extinct monotypic genus of dunkleosteid from the Middle Devonian: Givetian aged Guanwu Formation in the Sichuan province of south-western China. The type species, Kiangyousteus yohii, was the first known arthrodire from Asia.

== Etymology ==
Kiangyousteus is named after Jiangyou (formerly ‘Kiangyou’) district of Sichuan Province, the location where the fossils were found in 1953 by Professor S. H. Yoh of Peking University.

== Phylogeny ==
Kiangyousteus belongs to the family Dunkleosteidae. The phylogeny of Kiangyousteus can be shown in the cladogram below:

- Dunkleosteoidea
  - Westralichthys uwagedensis
  - - - Protitanichthys rockportensis
      - Panxiosteidae
        - Panxiosteus ocullus
        - Janiosteus timanicus
        - Plourdosteus canadensis
    - Dunkleosteidae
      - - Eastmanosteus calliaspis
        - Xiangshuiosteus wui
      - - Eastmanosteus pustulosus
        - Kiangyousteus yohii
        - Golshanichthys asiatica
        - - Dunkleosteus amblyodoratus
          - Dunkleosteus terrelli
          - Dunkleosteus raveri

Alternatively, the subsequent 2016 Zhu et al. study using a larger morphological dataset recovered Panxiosteidae well outside of Dunkleosteoidea, leaving the status of Dunkleosteidae as a clade grouping separate from Dunkleosteoidea in doubt, as shown in the cladogram below:

- Dunkleosteoidea
  - Eastmanosteus calliaspis
  - - - Eastmanosteus pustulosus
      - Kiangyousteus yohii
    - - Golshanichthys asiatica
      - - Westralichthys uwagedensis
        - - - Dunkleosteus raveri
            - Dunkleosteus terrelli
          - - Dunkleosteus amblyodoratus
            - Heterostiidae
              - Heterosteus ingens
              - Yinosteus major
