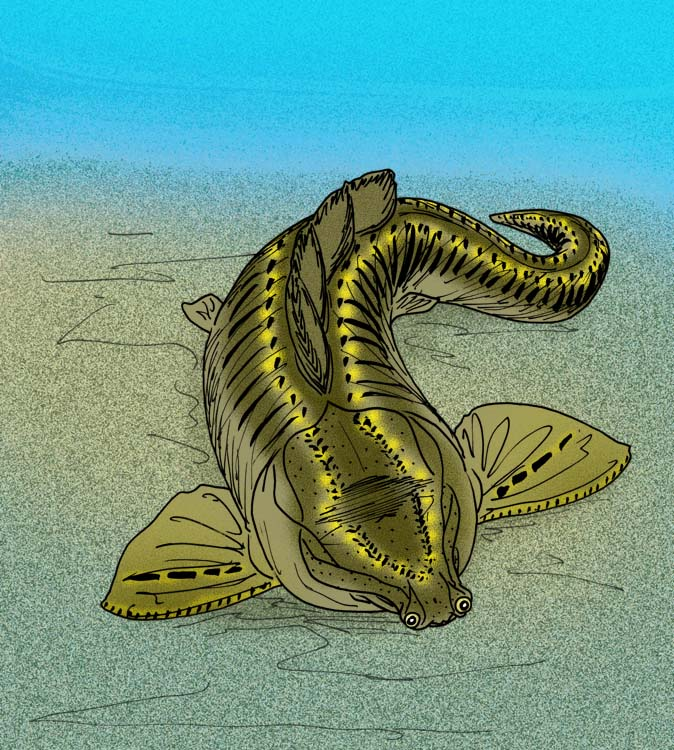
- Life reconstruction of Yinostius major

Scientific classification
- Kingdom: Animalia
- Phylum: Chordata
- Class: †Placodermi
- Order: †Arthrodira
- Suborder: †Brachythoraci
- Family: †Heterosteidae
- Genus: †Yinostius; J. Wang & N. Wang, 1984

Species
- Yinostius major J. Wang & N. Wang, 1984 (Type)

Synonyms
- Yinosteus

= Yinostius =

Yinostius Temporal range: Early Devonian: Emsian, 407.6–393.3 Ma

Extinct genus of fishes

Yinostius is an extinct genus of heterosteid placoderm of the Middle Devonian known from remains discovered in China.

== Description ==
This genus is known from Emsian-aged specimens from the Wuding region of Yunnan, China. In overall anatomy, it is extremely similar to the European genera, though it differs from them in its slightly smaller size, the shape of its nuchal plate, and in various body proportions.

== Phylogeny ==
Yinostius is a member of the family Heterosteidae, which belongs to the superfamily Dunkleosteoidea. It is a relative of the giant Dunkleosteus, as shown in the cladogram below:

- Dunkleosteoidea
  - Eastmanosteus calliaspis
  - - - Eastmanosteus pustulosus
      - Kiangyousteus yohii
    - - Golshanichthys asiatica
      - - Westralichthys uwagedensis
        - - - Dunkleosteus raveri
            - Dunkleosteus terrelli
          - - Dunkleosteus amblyodoratus
            - Heterostiidae
              - Heterosteus ingens
              - Yinostius major
