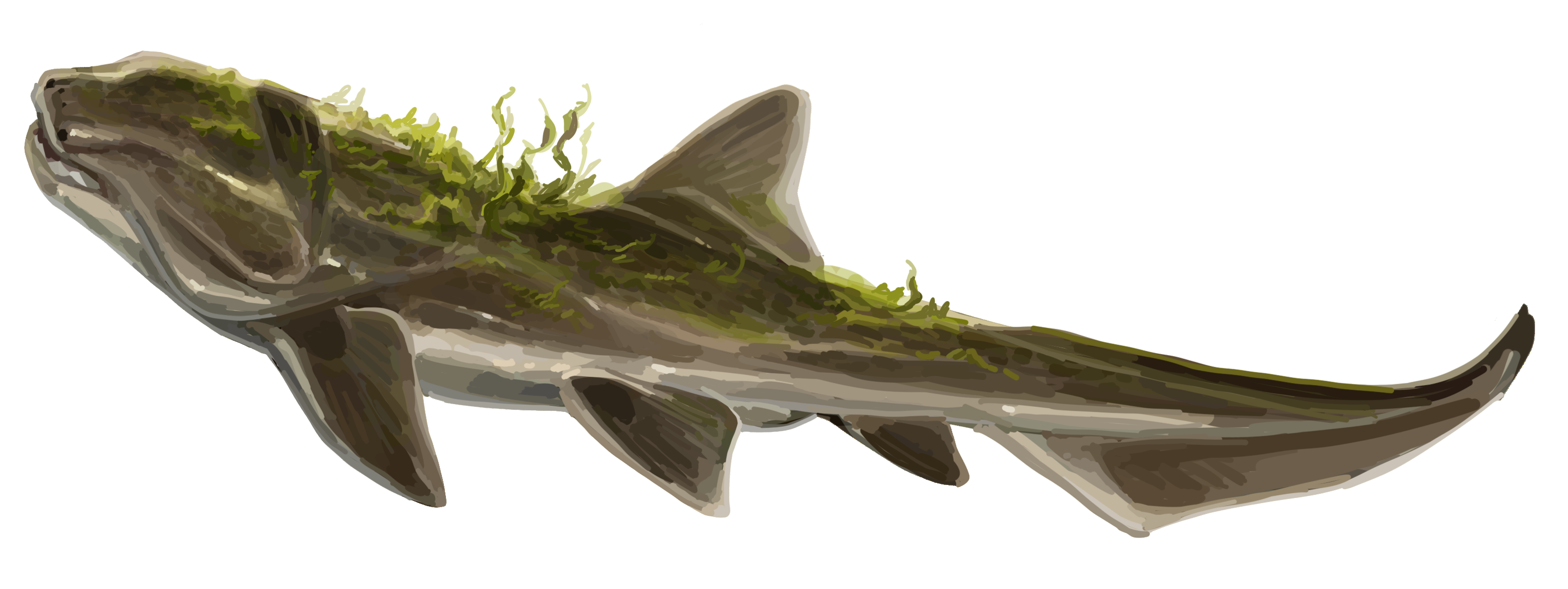
- Life reconstruction of Heterosteus ingens

Scientific classification
- Kingdom: Animalia
- Phylum: Chordata
- Class: †Placodermi
- Order: †Arthrodira
- Suborder: †Brachythoraci
- Family: †Heterosteidae
- Genus: †Heterosteus; Asmuss, 1856

Species
- Heterosteus asmussi Agassiz, 1844 (type); Heterosteus ingens; Heterosteus rhenanus

Synonyms
- Chelonichthys asmussi

= Heterosteus =

Heterosteus Temporal range: Middle Devonian: Givetian, 387.7–382.7 Ma

Extinct genus of fishes

Heterosteus (also known as Heterostius) is an extinct genus of heterosteid placoderm of the Middle Devonian known from remains discovered in Europe and Greenland. According to Denison, 1978, Heterosteus might have been planktivorous, along with Homosteus, and Titanichthys.

== Name ==
Heterosteus was originally described in 1837 as species of Trionyx, a softshelled turtle. Also in later studies it was often misidentified and given names like Ichthyosauroides, Asterolepis asmussi and Chelonichthys asmusii. Even in recent studies, it is controversial as to whether to use genus name Heterosteus or Heterostius. According to International Code of Zoological Nomenclature, suffix ‘-ostius’ in scientific name should not be corrected as ‘-osteus’, so some studies use the genus name Heterostius.

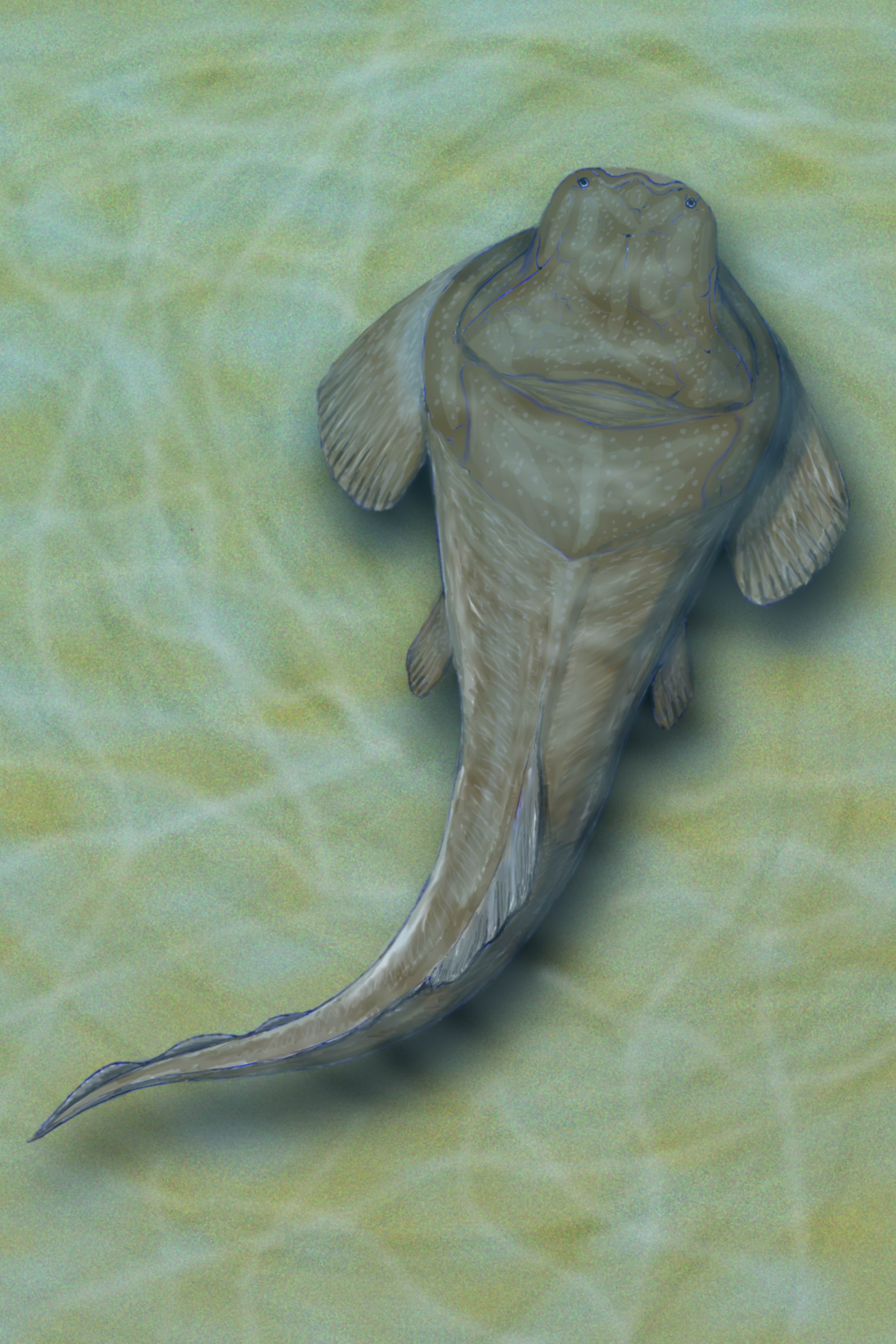
Life reconstruction of Heterosteus ingens

== Description ==
This genus includes the largest species in the family, and are among the largest arthrodires, as well, with the type species, H. asmussi, having an estimated body length of up to 6 metres (19 ft 8 in). The genus differs from Herasmius by having the orbits on slightly longer eyestalk-like projections. The various species are found in Givetian-aged deposits in Europe and Greenland. With the except of the German H. rhenanus, all species are known from freshwater deposits: H. rhenanus is based on fragments found in a marine deposit.

== Phylogeny ==
Heterosteus is the type genus for the family Heterosteidae, which belongs to the superfamily Dunkleosteoidea. It is a relative of the giant Dunkleosteus, as shown in the cladogram below:

- Dunkleosteoidea
  - Eastmanosteus calliaspis
  - - - Eastmanosteus pustulosus
      - Kiangyousteus yohii
    - - Golshanichthys asiatica
      - - Westralichthys uwagedensis
        - - - Dunkleosteus raveri
            - Dunkleosteus terrelli
          - - Dunkleosteus amblyodoratus
            - Heterostiidae
              - Heterosteus ingens
              - Yinosteus major
