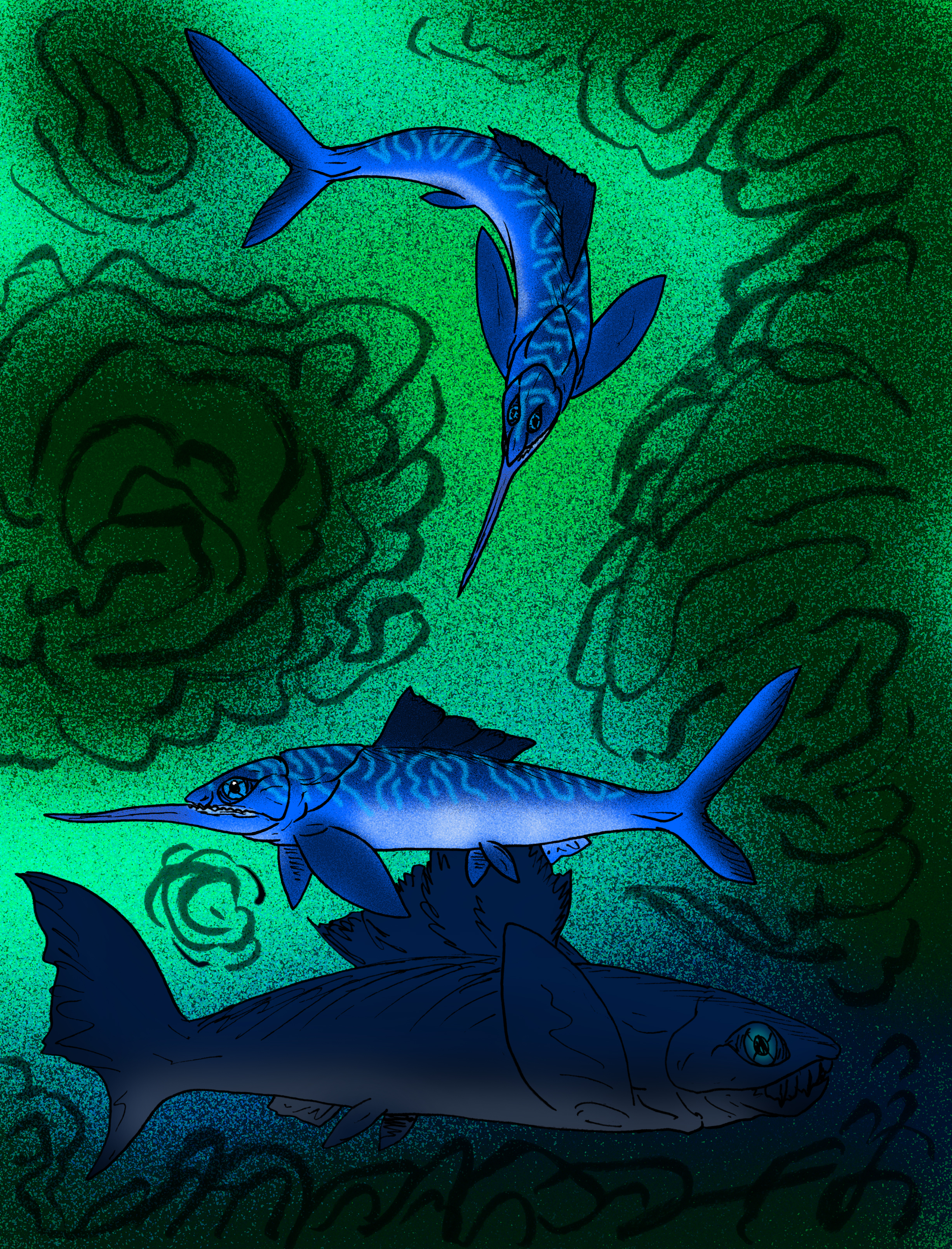
- A. malkowskii and Hadrosteus

Scientific classification
- Kingdom: Animalia
- Phylum: Chordata
- Class: †Placodermi
- Order: †Arthrodira
- Suborder: †Brachythoraci
- Family: †Selenosteidae
- Genus: †Alienacanthus; Kulczycki, 1957

Type species
- †Alienacanthus malkowskii Julian Kulczycki, 1957

= Alienacanthus =

Alienacanthus Temporal range: Famennian, 371.1–358.9 Ma

Genus of selenosteid placoderm from the Devonian

Alienacanthus (/æliˌiːnəˈkænθəs/) (meaning "alien spine") is a genus of selenosteid placoderm from the Famennian Ostrówka Quarry in the Świętokrzyskie Mountains, Poland, and Kowala Quarry along with the Maïder Basin in the Anti-Atlas, Morocco. The type and only species is A. malkowskii, known from a handful of specimens.

== Description ==
Alienacanthus' holotype, MZ VIII Vp-45, was referred to A. malkowskii in 1957 by Kulczycki, (1957). It consists of what were originally interpreted as "fragments of large osseous spines". However two epitypes described by Jobbins et al., (2024) that preserve more material shows that what Kulczycki, (1957) interpreted as "spines" are in fact fragmentary inferognathals. The epitypes, PIMUZ A/I 5239 and MCD 201, both comprise "a nearly complete articulated skull with all gnathal elements." and "left side of partially preserved skull with all gnathal elements." respectively. The combination of a short upper jaw and elongated lower jaw is a striking case of convergent evolution with halfbeaks. Alienacanthus was likely piscivorous, with jaws bearing sharp, posteriorly recurved teeth on both its upper and lower jaws, suggesting a grasping and trapping live prey.

== Etymology ==
The generic name, Alienacanthus (Latin pronunciation: [aliˈeːnaˈkantʰʊs]), derives from the Latin 'aliena' which means alien, and 'canthus' which means spine, referring to what Kulczycki, (1957) thought were spines. The specific name, malkowskii, is named after Prof. St. Malkowski, the former Director of the Muzeum Ziemi in Warsaw; Poland.

== Classification ==
Originally, Kulczycki, (1957) described Alienacanthus as a putative placoderm, noting that the traits the holotype possessed did not belong in either Selachii or Acanthodii. Jobbins et al., (2024) ran a parsimony analysis utilising a character matrix based on 98 characters for 28 taxa. The analysis resulted in Alienacanthus being recovered in Selenosteidae in a polytomy with Amazichthys, and a polytomic clade comprising Melanosteus, Enseosteus, Walterosteus, and Draconichthys. Their results are shown below:

- Arthrodira
  - Dicksonosteus
  - - Holonema
    - - Homosteus
      - - Buchanosteus
        - - Coccosteomorpha
          - Pachyosteomorpha
            - - Dunkleosteus spp.
              - - Protitanichthys
                - - Plourdosteus
                  - - Panxiosteus
                    - Janiosteus
            - Selenosteidae
              - Driscollaspis
              - - Selenosteus
                - - Rhinosteus
                  - - Gymnotrachelus
                    - Pachyosteus
                    - - Gorgonichthys
                      - Heintzichthys
                    - - Stenosteus
                      - - Amazichthys
                        - Alienacanthus
                        - - Melanosteus
                          - Enseosteus
                          - Walterosteus
                          - Draconichthys
