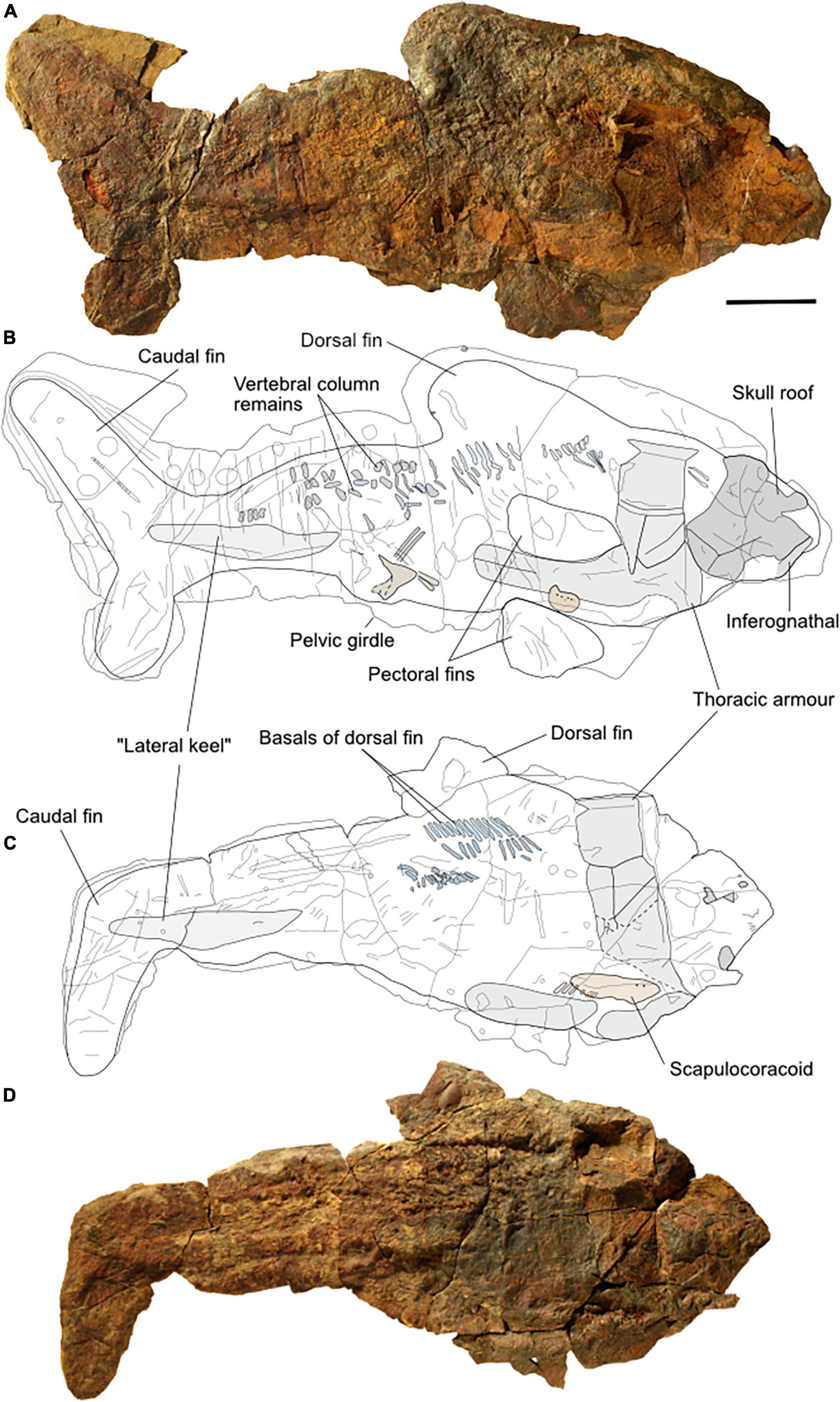
- Holotype specimen AA.MEM.DS.8 (A and B), and paratype PIMUZ A/I 4773 (C, D)
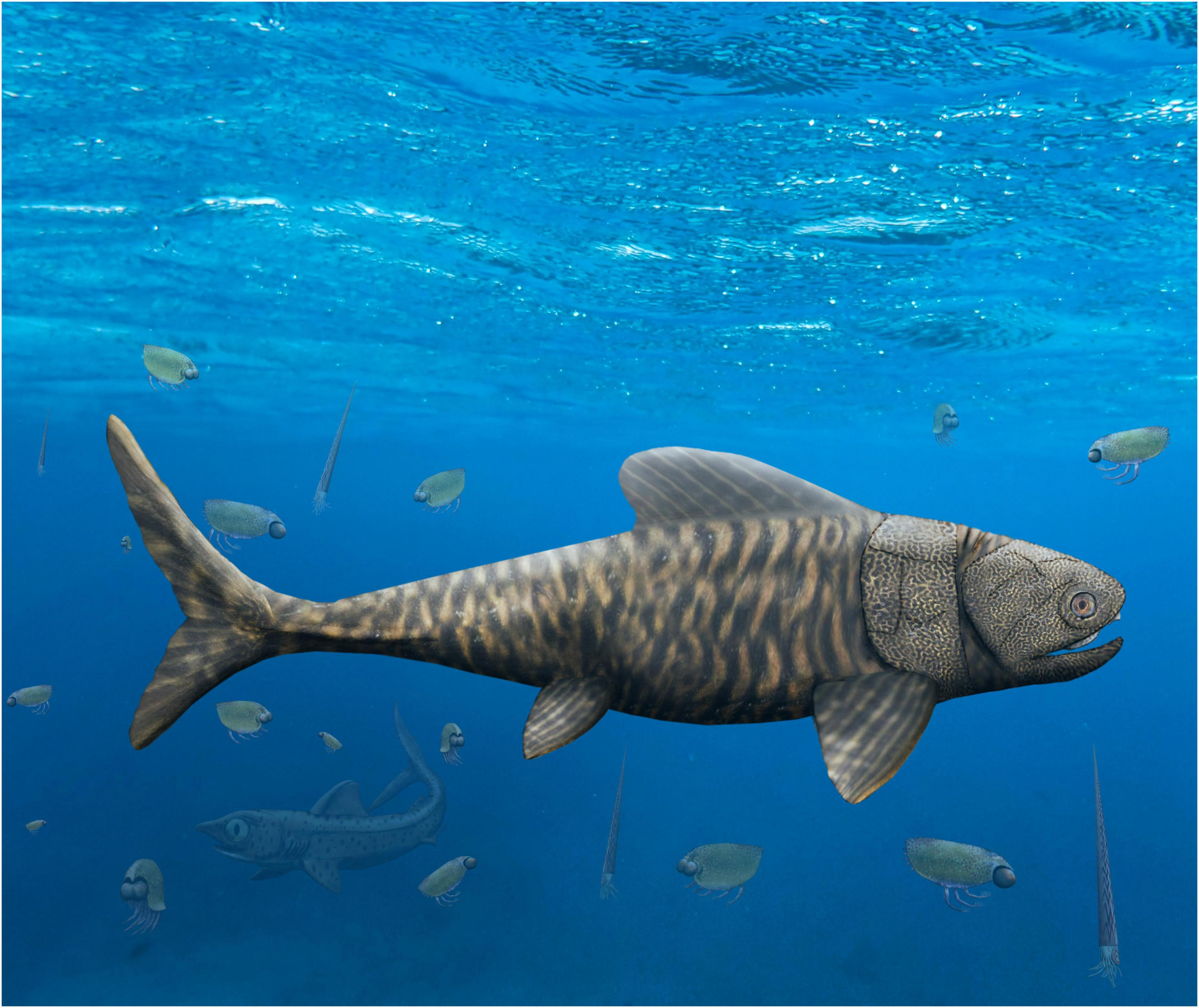
- Life reconstruction

Scientific classification
- Kingdom: Animalia
- Phylum: Chordata
- Class: †Placodermi
- Order: †Arthrodira
- Suborder: †Brachythoraci
- Family: †Selenosteidae
- Genus: †Amazichthys; Jobbins et al, 2022
- Species: †A. trinajsticae

Binomial name
- †Amazichthys trinajsticae Jobbins et al, 2022

= Amazichthys =

Amazichthys Temporal range: Famennian

Extinct genus of armored fish

Amazichthys is an extinct genus of selenosteid arthrodire from the Middle Famennian of the Late Devonian of the Anti-Atlas Mountains of Morocco. It contains a single species, Amazichthys trinajsticae. It is one of a few example of placoderm known from whole body shape, including cartilaginous axial and fin elements.

== Description ==
Amazichthys had a profile similar to that of fast-moving pelagic fishes, with lateral keels for stability, and a lunate caudal fin, suggesting it could reach and maintain high speed. The holotype, AA.MEM.DS.8, is 89.7 cm (35.3 in) long.

== Etymology ==
Amazichthys trinajsticae was named after the North African ethnic group Amazigh (Berbers), and Australian palaeontologist Kate Trinajstic.

== Taxonomy ==
Amazichthys is part of Selenosteidae, a family inside the clade Aspinothoracidi, inside of Pachyosteomorphi, along with Dunkleosteoidea.

The cladogram shown here is based on Jobbins et al, 2022.

- - Dicksonosteus
  - - Holonema
    - - Homosteus
      - - Buchanosteus
        - - - Coccosteus
            - - Harrytoombsia
              - - - Compagopiscis
                  - Mcnamaraspis
                - - Incisoscutum
                  - - Rolfosteus
                    - - Tubonasus
                      - - Camuropiscis
                        - Latocamurus
          - Pachyosteomorphi
            - Eastmanosteus
            - - - Dunkleosteus T
                - Dunkleosteus R
              - Aspinothoracidae
                - Stenosteus
                - Selenosteidae
                  - - Gymnotrachelus
                    - - Gorgonichthys
                      - Heintzichthys
                  - - Driscollaspis
                    - - Rhinosteus
                      - Selenosteus
                      - - Amazichthys
                        - - Melanosteus
                          - - Draconichthys
                            - - Enseosteus
                              - Walterosteus
