= The Sea Beast =

The Sea Beast may refer to:

- The Sea Beast (1926 film), an American silent drama film
- The Sea Beast (2022 film), an animated adventure film
- The Sea Beast, a fictional creature in the 1979 Scooby-Doo and Scrappy-Doo episode "Twenty Thousand Screams Under the Sea"
- "The Sea Beast", The Mighty Hercules season 3, episode 18 (1965)
- The Sea Beast, a cancelled video game project from Don Bluth Entertainment

== See also ==
- The Sea Beasts, a 1971 novel by A. Bertram Chandler
- Sea Beast, a 2008 American television monster movie
- Sea Dragon (disambiguation)
- Sea of Monsters (disambiguation)
- Sea Monsters (disambiguation)
