= Dragonfish =

Dragonfish may refer to:

== Fish ==
- Barbeled dragonfish, a small bioluminescent deep-sea fish of the family Stomiidae
- Several species of fish of the family Pegasidae
- Violet goby, an eel-like brackish-water fish
- Polypterus senegalus, a fish of the family Polypteridae
- Asian arowana, a bonytongue fish of the family Osteoglossidae
- Draconichthys, an arthrodire placoderm named after Stomiid dragonfishes

== Other uses ==
- Dragonfish (novel), a 2015 novel by Vu Tran
- Dragonfish (Dungeons & Dragons), a fictional magical beast
- Dragonfish Nebula, an emission nebula and star-forming region

== See also ==
- Dragonet, fish of the Callionymidae
- Sea Dragon (disambiguation)
