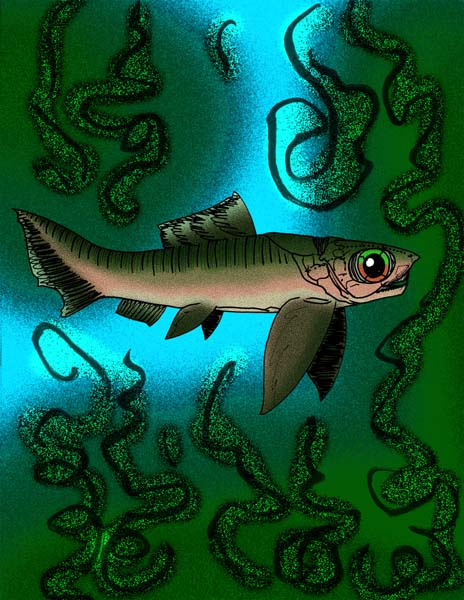
- Artist's reconstruction

Scientific classification
- Kingdom: Animalia
- Phylum: Chordata
- Class: †Placodermi
- Order: †Arthrodira
- Suborder: †Brachythoraci
- Family: †Selenosteidae
- Genus: †Braunosteus; Stensiö 1959
- Species: †B. schmidti

Binomial name
- †Braunosteus schmidti Stensiö 1959

= Braunosteus =

Braunosteus Temporal range: Late Frasnian

Extinct genus of fishes

Braunosteus schmidti is a medium-sized selenosteid arthrodire placoderm known from the Upper Frasnian Kellwasserkalk facies of Late Devonian Bad Wildungen, Germany. B. schmidti has a broad skull about 9 centimeters long, and a short, but pointed rostrum. Its appearance is very similar to that of the basal selenosteid Pachyosteus.

It was originally placed within a monotypic family, "Braunosteidae," by Erik Stensiö in 1959. Obruchev (1964) and Miles (1969) placed it within the Trematosteidae due to the presence of a postpineal fenestra. Denison (1978) has B. schmidti placed within Selenosteidae, noting that other arthrodires in addition to trematosteids have postpineal fenestrae, as well as similar anatomy of the orbital and suborbital plates, and that its scapulo-coracoid bone is largely identical to those of Pachyosteus and Enseosteus.
