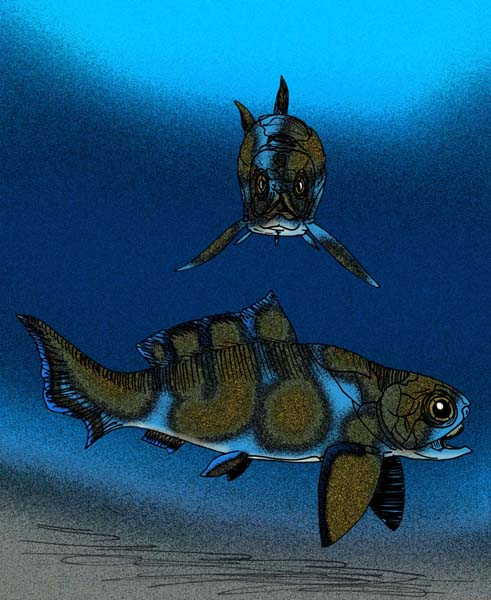
- Artist's reconstruction

Scientific classification
- Kingdom: Animalia
- Phylum: Chordata
- Class: †Placodermi
- Order: †Arthrodira
- Suborder: †Brachythoraci
- Family: †Selenosteidae
- Genus: †Paramylostoma
- Species: †P. arcualis

Binomial name
- †Paramylostoma arcualis Dunkle & Bungart 1945

= Paramylostoma =

Paramylostoma Temporal range: Late Famennian

Extinct genus of fishes

Paramylostoma arcualis is an extinct selenosteid arthrodire placoderm from the Late Famennian Cleveland Shale of Late Devonian Ohio. It has a compressed, box-like head and thoracic armor, and large, rounded orbits. However, in comparison with other selenosteids, such as Selenosteus, P. arcualis' orbits were rather small. P. arcualis had smooth jaws that suggest the animal was durophagous.
