= USS Seadragon (SSN-584) =

Submarine of the United States

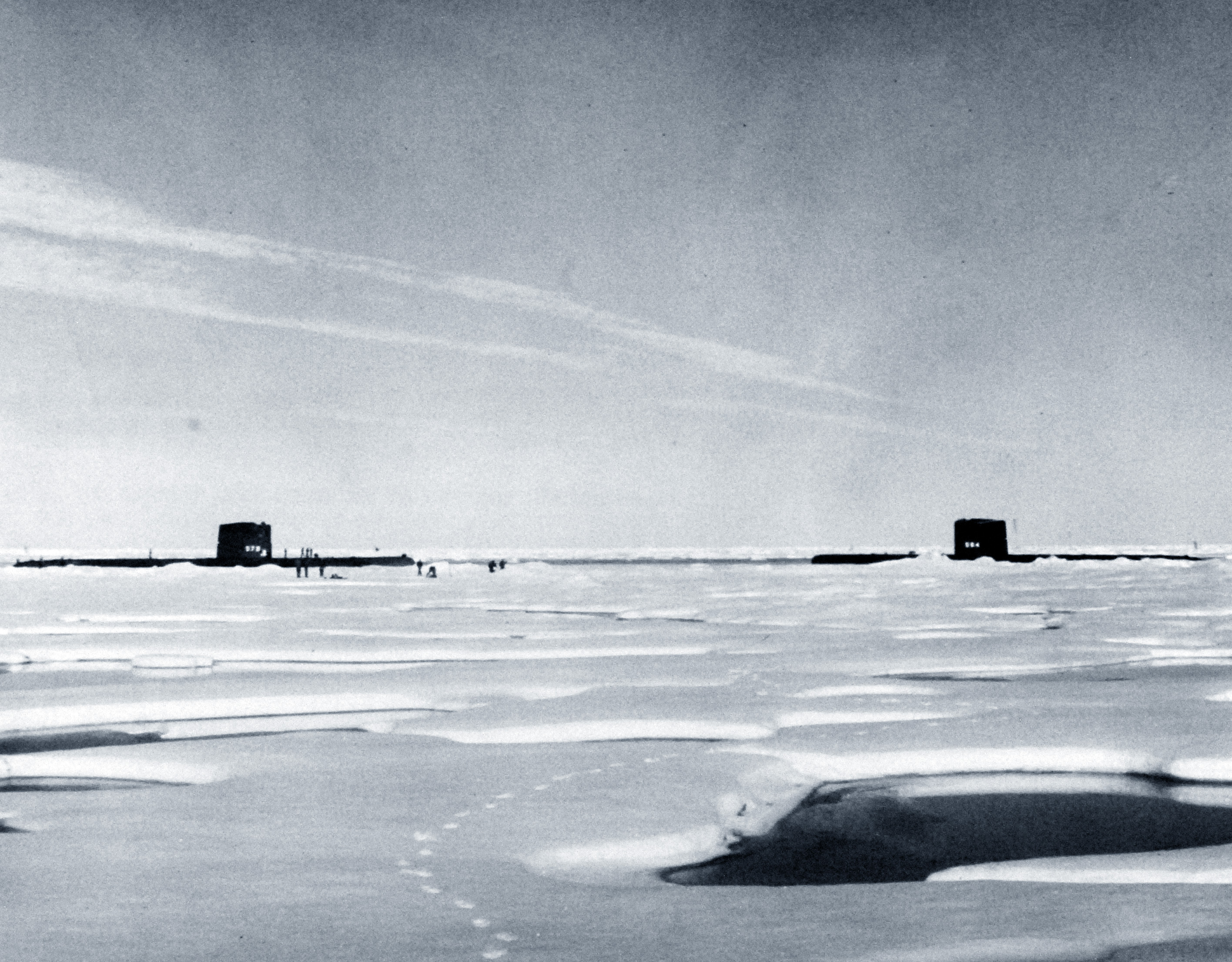
- Seadragon (right) and USS Skate (left) at the North Pole in 1962.

History

United States
- Name: USS Seadragon
- Awarded: 29 September 1955
- Builder: Portsmouth Naval Shipyard
- Laid down: 20 June 1956
- Launched: 16 August 1958
- Commissioned: 5 December 1959
- Decommissioned: 12 June 1984
- Stricken: 30 April 1986
- Fate: Submarine recycling program

General characteristics
- Class & type: Skate-class submarine
- Displacement: 2,580 long tons (2,620 t) surfaced; 2,861 long tons (2,907 t) submerged
- Length: 268 ft (82 m)
- Beam: 25 ft (7.6 m)
- Draft: 22 ft 5 in (6.83 m)
- Propulsion: S4W reactor plant (S3W reactor)
- Speed: 20 knots (23 mph; 37 km/h)+
- Complement: 95 officers and men
- Armament: 8 × 21 in (530 mm) torpedo tubes (6 forward, 2 aft)

USS Seadragon (SSN-584), a Skate-class submarine, was the second ship of the United States Navy to be named for the seadragon, a name for some types of seahorse. She was a nuclear-powered submarine.

== Construction and commissioning ==
The contract to build Seadragon was awarded to Portsmouth Naval Shipyard in Kittery, Maine, on 29 September 1955 and her keel was laid down on 20 June 1956. She was launched on 16 August 1958, sponsored by Mrs. Robert L. Dennison, wife of Admiral Robert L. Dennison. Seadragon collided with a whale on October 6, 1959, during sea trials, causing only minor damage. The ship was commissioned on 5 December 1959, with Lieutenant Commander George P. Steele in command.

== Operational history ==
Following a Caribbean shakedown cruise, Seadragon returned to Portsmouth Naval Shipyard, whence, on 1 August 1960, she sailed for the Pacific. Ordered to proceed via the Northwest Passage, she moved north to Parry Channel, at mid-month reached Lancaster Sound, the eastern end of the channel, and continued westward with Edward Parry's 1819 journal as a guide.

Collecting oceanographic and hydrographic data en route, Seadragon transited the Barrow Strait, Viscount Melville Sound, and McClure Strait. On 21 August, she completed the first submarine transit of the Northwest Passage, entered the Beaufort Sea, and headed for the North Pole, which she reached on 25 August. The ship surfaced through the thin ice becoming the third submarine to surface at the pole. Members of the crew laid out a softball diamond with the pitcher's box at the pole where the captain claimed he hit a fly ball at 4:00 pm on Wednesday and it wasn't caught until 4:00 am on Thursday. From the pole, Seadragon (having no other choice) turned south, and after conducting experiments in cooperation with scientists on ice island T-3, headed for the Chukchi Sea and Bering Strait. On 5 September, she reached Nome, Alaska, and, nine days later, she arrived at her home port, Pearl Harbor. She was awarded the Navy Unit Commendation for her transit of the Northwest Passage via Parry Channel.

For the next nine months, Seadragon was employed in local operations. In June 1961, she headed west for her first tour in the western Pacific (WestPac), during which she participated in Seventh Fleet exercises – primarily antisubmarine warfare training exercises – and completed a submerged endurance cruise of 58 days. In October, she returned to Pearl Harbor and local operations.

On 12 July 1962, Seadragon departed Pearl Harbor for her second Arctic cruise. Transiting the Bering Strait and the Chukchi Sea, she contacted T-3, then moved further north to rendezvous with sister ship, USS Skate, en route from New London, Connecticut. On 31 July, the two submarines rendezvoused under the ice and continued on to the North Pole, arriving on 2 August for sonar and weapons evaluations. The submarines were joined by the icebreaker USS Burton Island. In late August, the submarines returned to their home ports. En route, Seadragon, which was scheduled to port at Seattle, Washington, rescued 12 survivors from a downed seaplane and delivered them to Port Angeles, Washington. On 14 September, Seadragon arrived back at Pearl Harbor.

During the first half of 1963, Seadragon participated in local operations and conducted her second WestPac cruise. On 8 July, she entered the Pearl Harbor Naval Shipyard for her first refueling and overhaul. In late May 1964, she resumed operations in the Hawaiian area. Torpedo evaluations off the Washington coast followed; and, on 10 August 1964, Seadragon sailed west in response to the Gulf of Tonkin incident. During September and October, she operated out of Subic Bay; then, after a call at Hong Kong continued on to Okinawa and Japan to conduct public relations cruises and to participate in further Seventh Fleet exercises.

On 27 October 1964, Seadragon became the first nuclear powered vessel to visit Hong Kong. This was followed shortly by an historic entry into Japanese waters and a port visit to Sasebo, Japan, on 12 November 1964. The visit was protested by China and the Soviet Union; the Soviets in particular warned that the visit would eventually lead to the introduction of nuclear weapons to Japan and alter the security status quo in East Asia. On 4 March 1965, she returned to Pearl Harbor. Again, in the fall of 1966 and early 1967, Seadragon became the first SSN to visit Yokosuka, Japan. She was the first nuclear powered vessel the Japanese government permitted to enter her home waters. This achievement has since often been compared with Commodore PERRY's first expedition to Japan in 1853 as an achievement in international diplomacy. Seadragon was the first SSN to visit Hobart, Australia in January 1983. In twenty-four years of active service, Seadragon steamed over 200,000 miles, dove and surfaced 1800 times, made thirteen deployments to the Western Pacific, and conducted four under ice operations. Seadragon was awarded the Navy Unit Commendation and the Meritorious Unit Commendation. The ship was overhauled three times, refueling at each overhaul. Pearl Harbor Naval Shipyard was her home for all the overhauls and performed the inactivation commencing 1 October 1983. Puget Sound Naval Shipyard, which she visited on occasional trips to the North Polar region, performed the recycling.

== Decommissioning ==
Decommissioned on 12 June 1984 and stricken from the Naval Vessel Register on 30 April 1986, ex-Seadragon entered the Navy's Nuclear-Powered Ship-Submarine Recycling Program on 1 October 1994. On 18 September 1995, Seadragon ceased to exist. Seadragon was decommissioned after only 24 1/2 years of commissioned service – five and a half years less than the normal 30 year service life for U.S. Navy submarines.

== In literature ==
Seadragon is featured in the 2017 novel SSN Seadragon: The Crucible of Leviathan by J. P. Ronald, in which she takes part in an operation to thwart Soviet intervention in the Vietnam War.
