= Sea Monsters =

A sea monster is a mythical sea creature.

Sea Monsters may refer to:

== Film ==
- Sea Monsters: A Prehistoric Adventure, a 2007 National Geographic 3D film
- Luca Paguro

== Television ==
=== Episodes ===
- "Chapter I: Sea Monsters" 100 Foot Wave season 1, episode 1 (2021)
- "Sea Monsters", Paleoworld season 1, episode 6 (1994)
- "Sea Monsters", MonsterQuest season 3, episode 10 (2009)

=== Shows ===
- Sea Monsters (TV series), a BBC television documentary series

== Other uses ==
- Sea Monsters: A Prehistoric Adventure (video game), a video game based on the film
- Seamonsters, a 1991 album by the Wedding Present
- The Sea Monster, engraving by Albrecht Dürer
- Sea Monsters, a 2019 novel by Chloe Aridjis

== See also ==
- Caspian Sea Monster, experimental Soviet ekranoplan
- Sigmund and the Sea Monsters, American children's television series
- Sense and Sensibility and Sea Monsters, 2009 parody novel
- See Monster, Art installation in North Somerset, England
- Sea Dragon (disambiguation)
- Sea of Monsters (disambiguation)
- The Sea Beast (disambiguation)
