= USS Seadragon =

Two ships of the United States Navy have borne the name USS Seadragon, named in honor of the seadragon, a small fish more commonly called the dragonet.

- The first USS Seadragon (SS-194), was a Sargo-class submarine, commissioned in 1939 and struck in 1948.
- The second USS Seadragon (SSN-584), was a Skate-class submarine, commissioned in 1959 and struck in 1986.
