= Phymosteus =

Phymosteus Temporal range: Early Famennian

Scientific classification
- Kingdom: Animalia
- Phylum: Chordata
- Class: †Placodermi
- Order: †Arthrodira
- Suborder: †Brachythoraci
- Family: †Selenosteidae
- Genus: †Phymosteus; Wang and Zhu, 2004
- Species: †P. liui

Binomial name
- †Phymosteus liui Wang and Zhu, 2004

Extinct genus of fishes

Phymosteus liui is an extinct large selenosteid arthrodire placoderm known from the Lower Famennian Xiejingshi Formation of Shimen County, Hunan province, in central China.

The holotype and only known specimen of P. liui is a V-shaped median dorsal plate with a distinctive texture. Because the fossil is incomplete, its exact relationship to the other selenosteids can not be satisfactorily determined.
