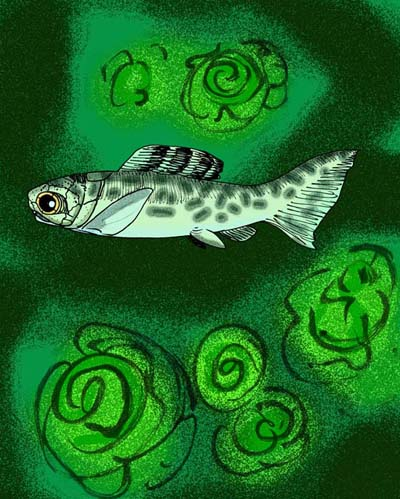
- Reconstruction of M. dubius

Scientific classification
- Kingdom: Animalia
- Phylum: Chordata
- Class: †Placodermi
- Order: †Arthrodira
- Suborder: †Brachythoraci
- Family: †Selenosteidae
- Genus: †Microsteus

Type species
- Microsteus dubius Gross 1932

Species
- Microsteus dubius Gross 1932; Microsteus angusticeps (Stensiö 1963); Microsteus gracilis (Stensiö 1963)

Synonyms
- Parawalterosteus angusticeps Stensiö 1963; Parawalterosteus gracilis Stensiö 1963

= Microsteus =

Microsteus Temporal range: Late Frasnian

Extinct genus of fishes

Microsteus is an extinct genus of small selenosteid arthrodire placoderms known from the Upper Frasnian Kellwasserkalk facies of Late Devonian Germany.

There are three species, M. dubius (the type species), M. angusticeps, and M. gracilis. M. angusticeps differs from the type species in having a head with an angular profile, and M. gracilis differs from the other two species by being somewhat narrower in cross-section. Denison (1978) suggests that M. angusticeps and M. gracilis do not have enough differences from M. dubius to merit separate species status, but other authors, such as Rücklin 2011, treat the three as separate species.

M. angusticeps and M. gracilis originally composed the genus Parawalterosteus. However, Denison (1978) points out that the two species are not distinct from Microsteus, and synonymized Parawalterosteus with the former genus.
