= Sea Dragon =

Sea Dragon or seadragon may refer to:

== Animals ==
- Leafy seadragon (Phycodurus eques)
- Phyllopteryx genus
  - Common seadragon or weedy seadragon (Phyllopteryx taeniolatus)
  - Ruby seadragon (Phyllopteryx dewysea)
- Glaucus atlanticus, a sea slug
- Thalassiodracon, a plesiosaur pliosauroid genus
- Thalassodraco, an ichthyosaur genus

== Military ==
- SSM-700K C-Star, a South Korean missile
- Operation Sea Dragon (Vietnam War), a military operation
- MH-53E Sea Dragon, a helicopter
- USS Seadragon, two ships of the US Navy
- Kairyū-class submarine ("Sea Dragon"), a class of Japanese submarines
- Blohm & Voss BV 138B, "Seedrache (Sea Dragon)", Luftwaffe's main long-range maritime reconnaissance flying boat

== Other uses ==
- Sea Dragon (rocket), a 1960s proposed American super heavy lift two stage sea launched rocket
- Sea Dragon (roller coaster), in Powell, Ohio, U.S.
- Sea Dragon-class ROV, a remotely operated underwater vehicle developed by China
- Sea Dragon, a Chinese junk lost at sea in the Pacific Ocean in 1939 with Richard Halliburton onboard
- Sea Dragon (video game), is a horizontally scrolling shooter for the TRS-80 computer, written by Wayne Westmoreland and Terry Gilman, and released in 1982 by Adventure International
- Sea serpent, a mythical sea creature
- Seadragon, a zooming technology by Seadragon Software
- Sea Dragon, a fictional creature in the Majipoor novel series
- Sea Dragon Leviathan, an organism in Subnautica
- Sea dragon, a large extinct marine reptile formally known as an ichthyosaur
- Francisco José do Nascimento (1839-1914), Brazilian maritime pilot and abolitionist known as "Dragão do Mar" (Sea Dragon)

== See also ==
- Sea Monsters (disambiguation)
- Dragonfish (disambiguation)
- Dragon (disambiguation)
- The Dragon in the Sea, a novel by Frank Herbert
