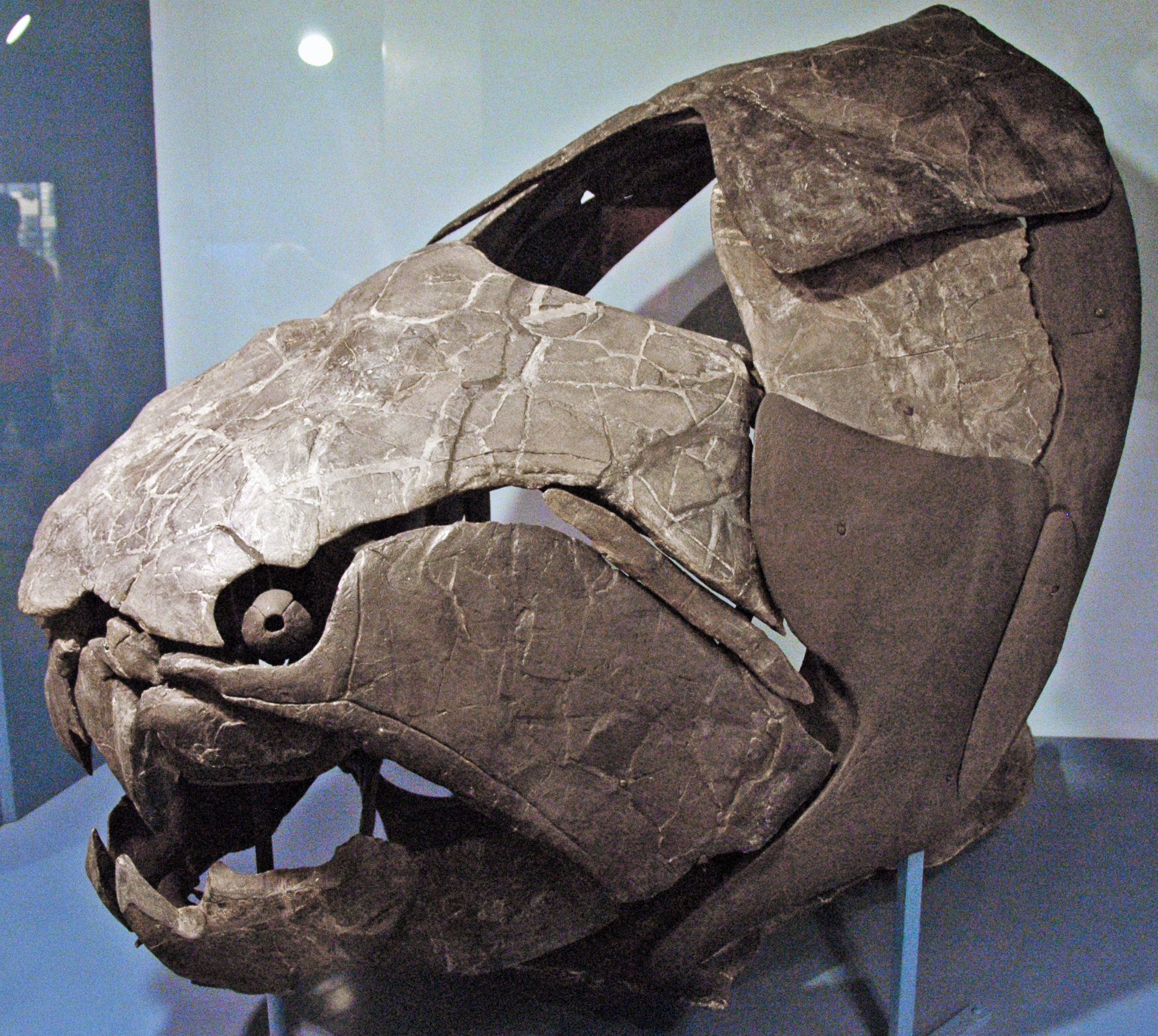
- Partially reconstructed D. terrelli skull and trunk armor (specimen CMNH 5768), Cleveland Museum of Natural History

Scientific classification
- Kingdom: Animalia
- Phylum: Chordata
- Class: †Placodermi
- Order: †Arthrodira
- Suborder: †Brachythoraci
- Family: †Dunkleosteidae
- Genus: †Dunkleosteus; Lehman, 1956

Type species
- †Dinichthys terrelli (original combination) Newberry, 1873

Species
- List: †D. amblyodoratus Carr & Hlavin, 2010 †D. belgicus (?) (Newberry, 1873) †D. denisoni (Kulczycki, 1957) †D. magnificus (Hussakof & Bryant, 1919) †D. marsaisi Lehmann, 1956 †D. missouriensis (Branson, 1914) †D. newberryi (Clarke, 1885) †D. raveri Carr & Hlavin, 2010 †D. terrelli (Newberry, 1873 [originally Dinichthys]) †D. tuderensis Lebedev et al., 2023

= Dunkleosteus =

Dunkleosteus Temporal range: Late Devonian (Frasnian to Famennian), 382–358 Ma

Genus of extinct fishes

Dunkleosteus is an extinct genus of large arthrodire ("jointed-neck") fish that existed during the Late Devonian period, about 382–358 million years ago. It was a pelagic fish inhabiting open waters, and one of the first vertebrate apex predators of any ecosystem. Fossils of Dunkleosteus have been found in the United States, Canada, Poland, Belgium, Morocco, Russia, and Latvia.

Dunkleosteus consists of ten species, some of which are among the largest placoderms ("plate-skinned") to have ever lived: D. terrelli, D. belgicus, D. denisoni, D. marsaisi, D. magnificus, D. missouriensis, D. newberryi, D. amblyodoratus, D. raveri, and D. tuderensis. However, the validity of several of these species is unclear. The largest and best known species is D. terrelli, the type species.

Since body shape is not known, various methods of estimation put the living total length of the largest known specimen of D. terrelli between 4.1 to 10 m (13 to 33 ft) long and its weight around 1–4 t (1.1–4.4 short tons). However, current evidence suggests length of less than 5 metres (16 ft) was more likely, with the most recent and extensive studies on the body shape and size of D. terrelli producing estimated lengths of approximately 3.4 metres (11 ft) for typical adults and 4.1 metres (13 ft) for exceptionally large individuals of this species. It has been suggested that Dunkleosteus could quickly open and close its jaw, possibly creating suction like modern-day suction feeders, and had an extremely high bite force, but both claims have recently been questioned.

== Discovery ==
Dunkleosteus fossils were first discovered in 1867 by Jay Terrell, a hotel owner and amateur paleontologist who collected fossils in the cliffs along Lake Erie near his home of Sheffield Lake, Ohio (due west of Cleveland), United States. Terrell donated his fossils to John Strong Newberry and the Ohio Geological Survey, who in 1873 described all the material as belonging to a single new genus and species: Dinichthys herzeri. However, with later fossil discoveries, by 1875 it became apparent multiple large fish species were present in the Ohio Shale. Dinichthys herzeri came from the lowermost layer, the Huron Shale, whereas most of the fossils were coming from the younger Cleveland Shale and represented a distinct species. Newberry named this more common species "Dinichthys" terrelli, after Terrell. Most of Terrell's original collection does not survive, having been destroyed by a fire in Elyria, Ohio, in 1873.

The largest collection of Dunkleosteus fossils in the world is housed at the Cleveland Museum of Natural History, with smaller collections (in descending order of size) held at the American Museum of Natural History, Smithsonian National Museum of Natural History, Yale Peabody Museum, the Natural History Museum in London, and the Cincinnati Museum Center. Specimens of Dunkleosteus are on display in many museums throughout the world (see table below), most of which are casts of the same specimen: CMNH 5768, the largest well-preserved individual of D. terrelli. The original CMNH 5768 is on display in the Cleveland Museum of Natural History.

== Taxonomy ==
Dunkleosteus was named by Jean-Pierre Lehman in 1956 to honour David Dunkle (1911–1984), former curator of vertebrate paleontology at the Cleveland Museum of Natural History. The genus name Dunkleosteus combines David Dunkle's surname with the Greek word ὀστέον (ostéon 'bone'), literally meaning "Dunkle's bone".

Originally thought to be a member of the genus Dinichthys, Dunkleosteus was later recognized as belonging to its own genus in 1956. It was thought to be closely related to Dinichthys, and they were grouped together in the family Dinichthyidae. However, in the phylogenetic analysis of Carr and Hlavin (2010), Dunkleosteus and Dinichthys were found to belong to separate clades of arthrodires: Dunkleosteus belonged to a group called the Dunkleosteoidea while Dinichthys belonged to the distantly related Aspinothoracidi. Carr & Hlavin resurrected the family Dunkleosteidae and placed Dunkleosteus, Eastmanosteus, and a few other genera from Dinichthyidae within it. Dinichthyidae, in turn, is left a monospecific family, though closely related to arthrodires like Gorgonichthys and Heintzichthys.

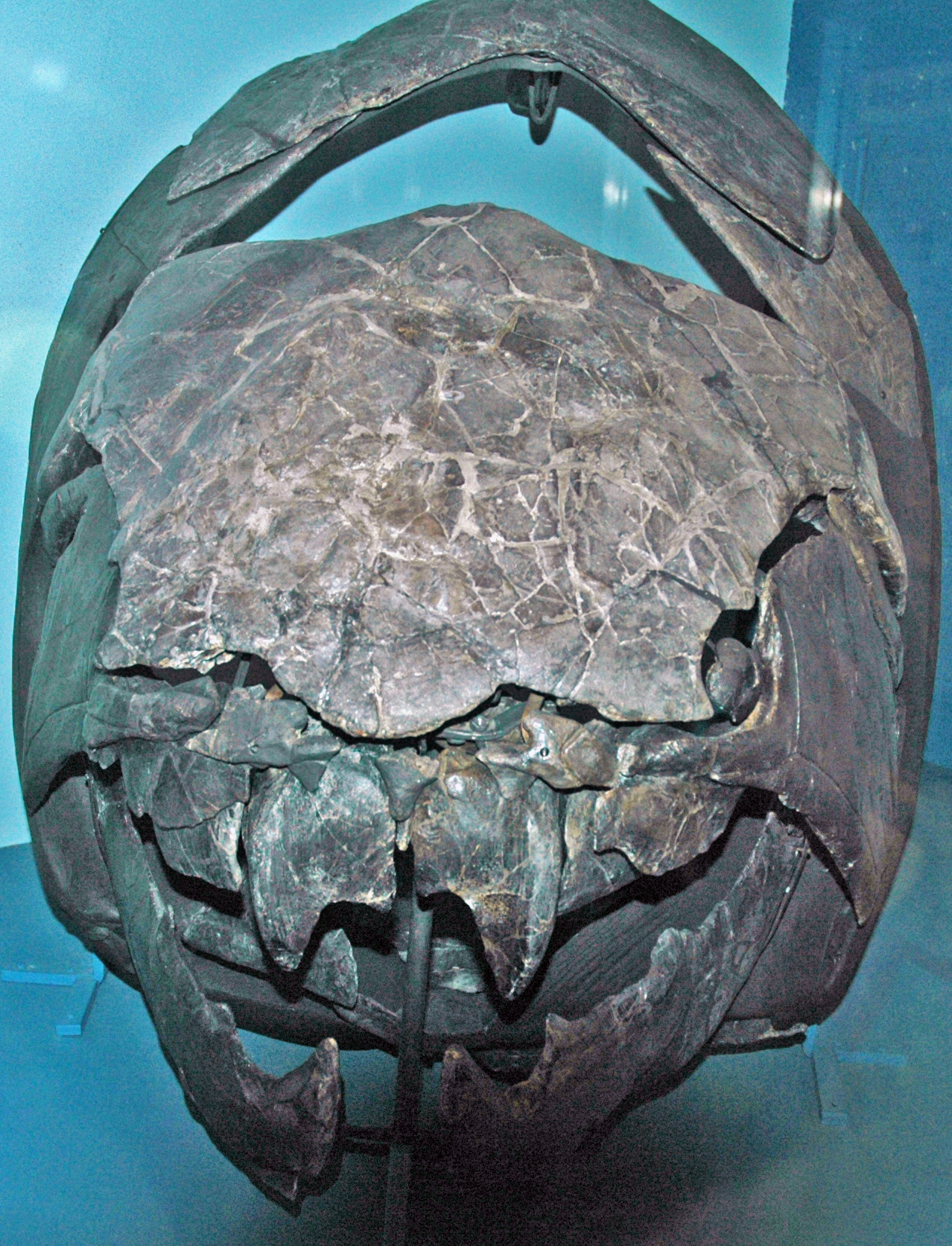
Front view of D. terrelli skull

The cladogram below from the study of Zhu & Zhu (2013) shows the placement of Dunkleosteus within Dunkleosteidae and Dinichthys within the separate clade Aspinothoracidi:

- Eubrachythoraci
  - - Coccosteomorphi
      - Coccosteus cuspidatus
      - - Harrytoombsia elegans
        - - Mcnamaraspis kaprios
          - Incisoscutoidea
            - Compagopiscis croucheri
            - - Incisoscutum ritchiei
              - Incisoscutum sarahae
            - Camuropiscidae
              - Latocamurus coulthardi
              - Camuropiscis laidlawi
              - - Rolfosteus canningensis
                - Tubonasus lennardensis
                - Fallacosteus turneri
    - Aspinothoracidi
      - Dinichthys herzeri
      - - Hadrosteus rapax
        - - Gorgonichthys clarki
          - - Heintzichthys gouldii
            - Selenosteidae
              - Stenosteus angustopectus
              - - Gymnotrachelus hydei
                - - Rhinosteus parvulus
                  - Pachyosteus bulla
  - Dunkleosteoidea
    - Westralichthys uwagedensis
    - - - Protitanichthys rockportensis
        - Panxiosteidae
          - Panxiosteus ocullus
          - Janiosteus timanicus
          - Plourdosteus canadensis
      - Dunkleosteidae
        - - Eastmanosteus calliaspis
          - Xiangshuiosteus wui
        - - Eastmanosteus pustulosus
          - Kiangyousteus yohii
          - Golshanichthys asiatica
          - - Dunkleosteus amblyodoratus
            - Dunkleosteus terrelli
            - Dunkleosteus raveri

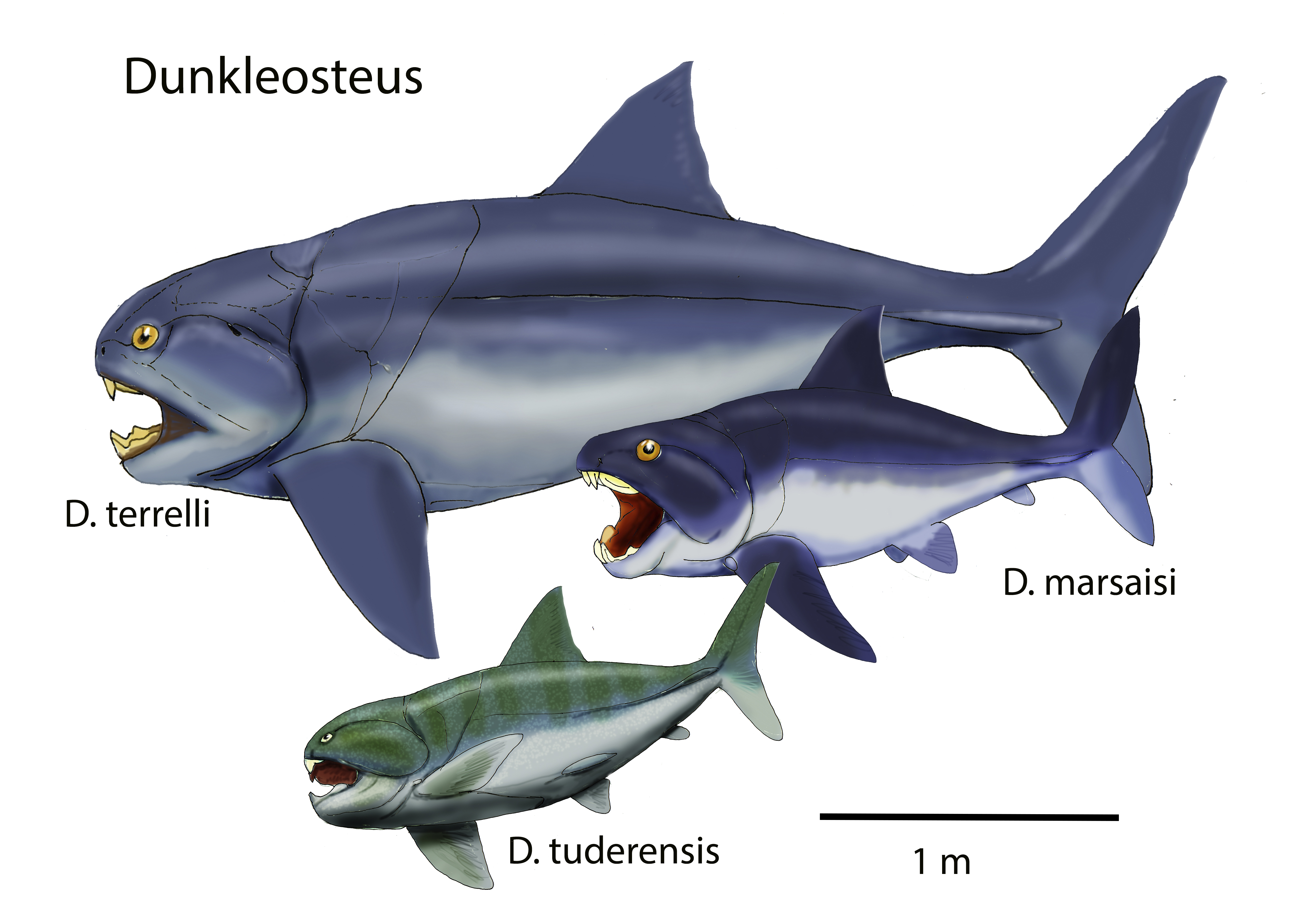
Life restorations of three species

Alternatively, the subsequent study by Zhu et al. (2016) using a larger morphological dataset recovered Panxiosteidae well outside of Dunkleosteoidea, leaving the status of Dunkleosteidae as a clade grouping separate from Dunkleosteoidea in doubt, as shown in the cladogram below:

- Eubrachythoraci
  - Coccosteomorphi
    - Coccosteoidea
      - Coccosteidae
        - - Millerosteus minor
          - Coccosteus cuspidatus
        - - Dickosteus threiplandi
          - Watsonosteus fletti
          - Protitanichthys rockportensis
      - Panxiosteidae
        - Plourdosteus canadensis
        - Panxiosteus ocullus
        - Janiosteus timanicus
    - Incisoscutoidea
      - Harrytoombsia elegans
      - - Torosteus tuberculatus
        - Torosteus pulchellus
      - - Mcnamaraspis kaprios
        - - Compagopiscis croucheri
          - Trematosteus fontanellus
          - Camuropiscidae
            - - Incisoscutum ritchiei
              - Incisoscutum sarahae
            - - Rolfosteus canningensis
              - - Tubonasus lennardensis
                - - Fallacosteus turneri
                  - - Camuropiscis laidlawi
                    - Latocamurus coulthardi
  - Pachyosteomorphi
    - Rhachiosteus pterygiatus
    - - Dunkleosteoidea
        - Eastmanosteus calliaspis
        - - - Eastmanosteus pustulosus
            - Kiangyousteus yohii
          - - Golshanichthys asiatica
            - - Westralichthys uwagedensis
              - - - Dunkleosteus raveri
                  - Dunkleosteus terrelli
                - - Dunkleosteus amblyodoratus
                  - Heterostiidae
                    - Heterosteus ingens
                    - Yinostius major
      - Aspinothoracidi
        - Tapinosteus heintzi
        - - - Bullerichthys fascidens
            - - Kendrickichthys cavernosus
              - Bruntonichthys multidens
          - - Dinichthys herzeri
            - - Hadrosteus rapax
              - - Gorgonichthys clarki
                - Selenosteidae
                  - Heintzichthys gouldii
                  - Pachyosteus bulla
                  - Gymnotrachelus hydei
                  - Stenosteus angustopectus
                  - Brachyosteus dietrichi
                  - - Melanosteus occitanus
                    - Rhinosteus parvulus

=== Species ===
At least ten different species of Dunkleosteus have been described so far. However, many of them are poorly characterized and may be synonyms of previously named species or not pertain to Dunkleosteus. Dunkleosteus as currently defined is a wastebasket taxon for large dunkleosteoid arthrodires that are more evolutionarily derived than Eastmanosteus.

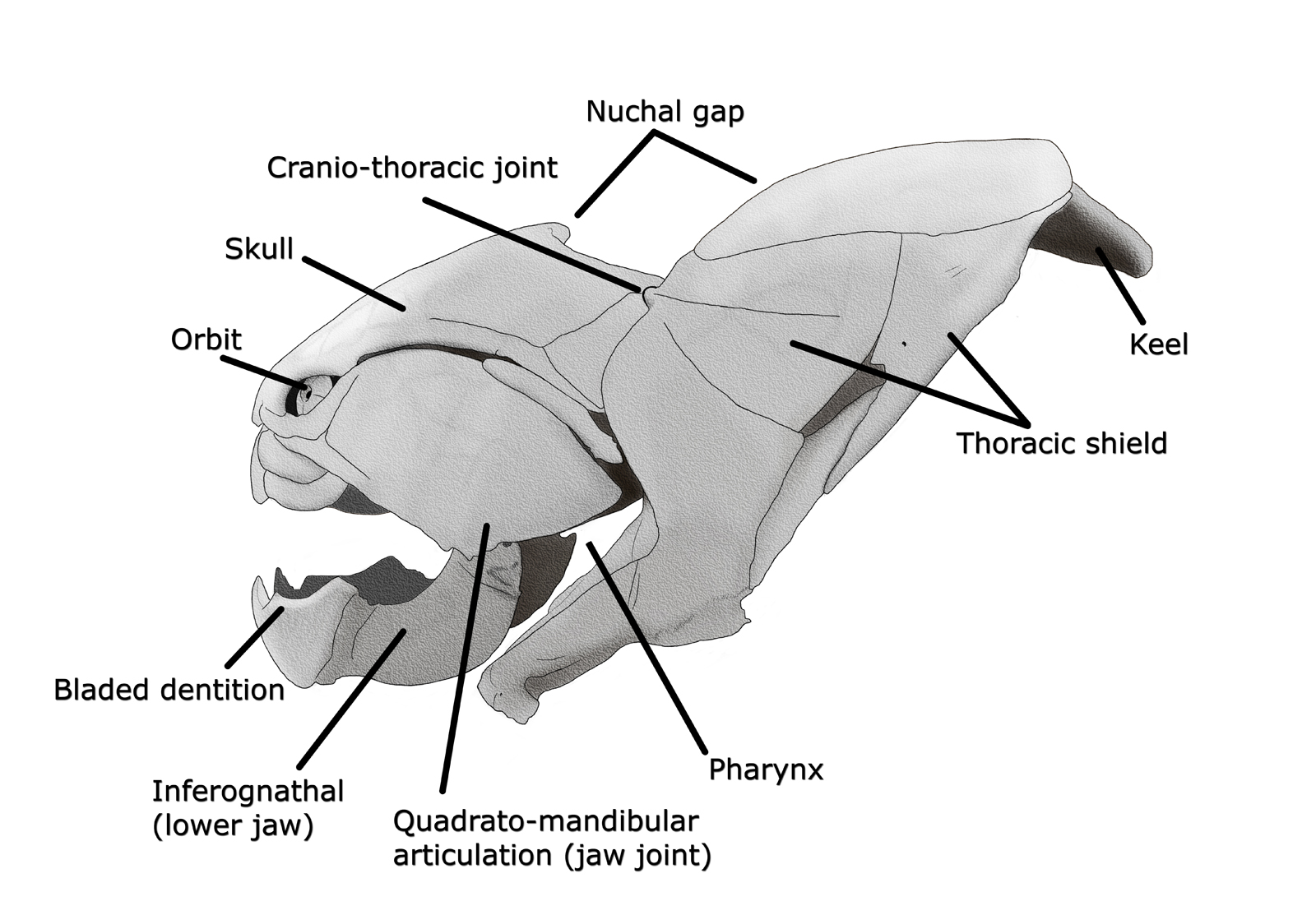
Labelled skull diagram of D. terrelli

The type species, D. terrelli, is the largest, best-known species of the genus. Size estimates for this species range from 4.1–10 m (13–33 ft) in length, though estimates greater than 4.5 m are poorly supported. Skulls of this species can be up to 60–70 cm (24–28 in) in length. D. terrelli's fossil remains are found in Upper Frasnian to Upper Famennian Late Devonian strata of the United States (Huron, Chagrin, and Cleveland Shales of Ohio, the Conneaut and Chadakoin Formations of Pennsylvania, the Chattanooga Shale of Tennessee, the Lost Burro Formation of California, and possibly the Ives breccia of Texas) and Europe.

D. belgicus (?) is known from fragments described from the Famennian of Belgium. The median dorsal plate is characteristic of the genus, but, a plate that was described as a suborbital is an anterolateral. Lelièvre (1982) considers this taxon a nomen dubium ("doubtful name") and suggests the material may actually pertain to Ardennosteus.

D. denisoni is known from a small median dorsal plate, typical in appearance for Dunkleosteus, but much smaller than normal. It is comparable in skull structure to D. marsaisi.

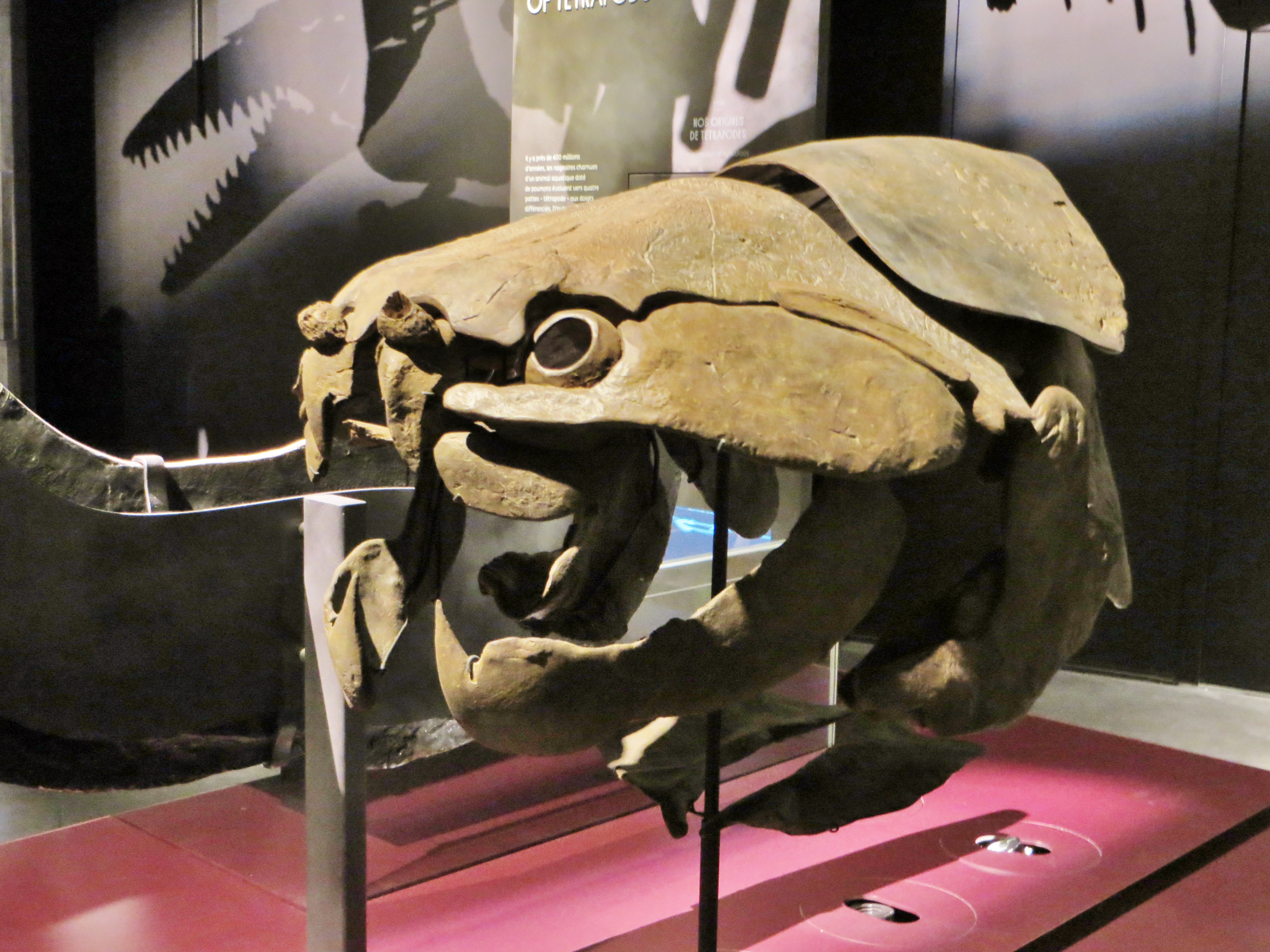
D. marsaisi skull

D. marsaisi refers to the Dunkleosteus fossils from the Lower Famennian Late Devonian strata of the Atlas Mountains in Morocco. It differs in size, the known skulls averaging a length of 35 centimetres (1.15 ft) and in form to D. terrelli. In D. marsaisi, the snout is narrower, and a postpineal fenestra may be present. Many researchers and authorities consider it a synonym of D. terrelli. H. Schultze regards D. marsaisi as a member of Eastmanosteus.

D. magnificus is a large placoderm from the Frasnian Rhinestreet Shale of New York. It was originally described as Dinichthys magnificus by Hussakof and Bryant in 1919, then as "Dinichthys mirabilis" by Heintz in 1932. Dunkle and Lane (1971) moved it to Dunkleosteus, whereas Dennis-Bryan (1987) considered it to belong to the genus Eastmanosteus. This species has a skull length of 55 cm (22 in) and a total estimated length of approximately 3 m (9.8 ft).

D. missouriensis is known from fragments from Frasnian Missouri. Dunkle and Lane regard them as being very similar to D. terrelli. In his revision of Dunkleosteus taxonomy, Hlavin (1976) considers this species to be tentatively synonymous with D. terrelli (Dunkleosteus cf. D. terrelli).

D. newberryi is known primarily from a 28 centimetres (11 in) long infragnathal with a prominent anterior cusp, found in the Frasnian portion of the Genesee Group of New York, and originally described as Dinichthys newberryi. Lebedev et al. (2023) noted D. newberryi has an unusually long marginal tooth row compared to other species of Dunkleosteus and lacks the accessory odontoids typical of this genus, suggesting it might not belong to Dunkleosteus or even Dunkleosteoidea.

D. amblyodoratus is known from some fragmentary remains from Late Devonian strata of Kettle Point Formation, Ontario. The species name means 'blunt spear' and refers to the way the nuchal and paranuchal plates in the back of the head form the shape of a blunted spearhead.

D. raveri is a small species, possibly 1 meter long, known from an uncrushed skull roof found in a carbonate concretion from near the bottom of the Huron Shale, of the Famennian Ohio Shale strata. Besides its small size, it had comparatively large eyes. Because D. raveri was found in the strata directly below the strata where the remains of D. terrelli are found, D. raveri may have given rise to D. terrelli. The species name commemorates Clarence Raver of Wakeman, Ohio, who discovered the concretion containing the holotype.

D. tuderensis is known from an infragnathal found in the lower-middle Famennian-aged Bilovo Formation of the Tver Region in northwest Russia. The specific name refers to the Maliy Tuder River as the holotype was found on its bank.

In total, of the ten or so species listed above only four are agreed upon as valid species of Dunkleosteus by all researchers: D. terrelli (which may or may not include Dunkleosteus material from Morocco), D. raveri, D. tuderensis, and possibly D. amblyodoratus (which is known from limited material that appears distinct but is difficult to compare with other dunkleosteids). The taxonomy of early late Devonian (Frasnian) species is poorly established, whereas latest Devonian (Famennian) species are easily referable to this genus. This is not counting additional material assigned to Dunkleosteus sp. from the Famennian of California, Texas, Tennessee, and Poland. Some material classified as Dunkleosteus sp. are also known from Devonian aged Klūnas site in Latvia.

== Description ==
=== Size and anatomy ===
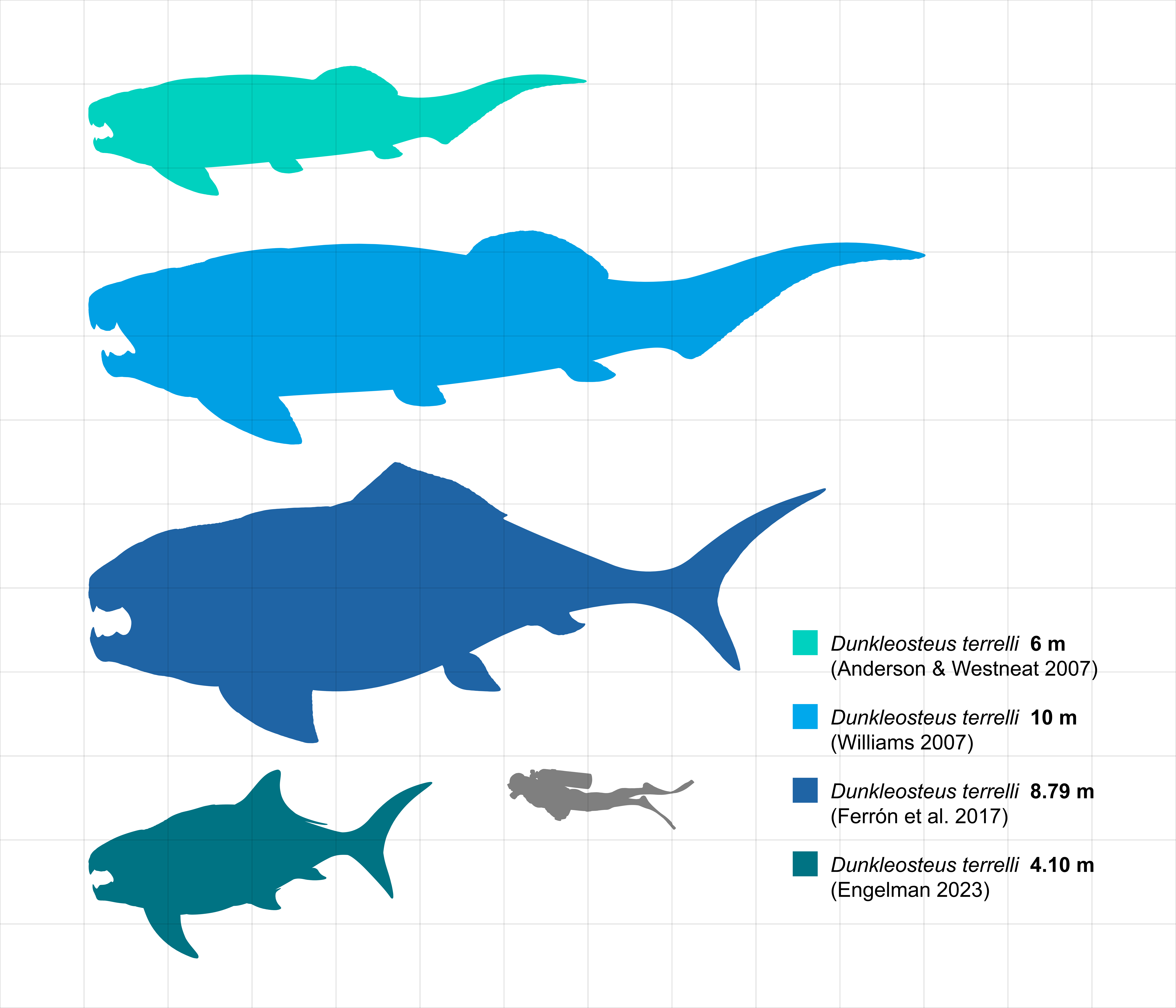
Comparison of multiple historical size estimates for D. terrelli , with the smallest size estimate (bottom) likely the most realistic

a skeletal of dunklesoteus terrelli with and without dermal armor showing lateral view, top view, and bottom view

a skeletal of dunklesoteus terrelli with and without dermal armor showing front and back view

Dunkleosteus was covered in dermal bone forming armor plates across its skull and front half of its trunk. This armor is often described as being over 2–3 inches (5.1–7.6 cm) thick, but this is only across the thickened nuchal plate at the back of the skull. Thickening of the nuchal plate is a common feature of eubrachythoracid arthrodires. Across the rest of the body the armor is generally much thinner, only about 0.33–1 inch (0.84–2.54 cm) in thickness. The plates of Dunkleosteus had both a hard cortical and a marrow-filled cancellous layer, unlike most teleost fishes and more similar to tetrapod bones.

Mainly the armored frontal sections of specimens have been fossilized, and consequently, the appearance of the other portions of the fish is mostly unknown. In fact, only about 5% of Dunkleosteus specimens have more than a quarter of their skeleton preserved. Because of this, many reconstructions of the hindquarters are often based on fossils of smaller arthrodires, such as Coccosteus, which have preserved hind sections, leading to widely varying size estimates.

Dunkleosteus terrelli is one of the largest known placoderms, with its maximum size being variably estimated as anywhere from 4.1–10 metres (13–33 ft) by different researchers. However, most cited length estimates are speculative and lack quantitative or statistical backing, and lengths of 5 m (16 ft) or more are poorly supported. Most studies that estimate the length of Dunkleosteus terrelli do not provide information as to how these estimates were calculated, the measurements used to scale them, or which specimens were examined. Estimates in these studies are implied to be based on either CMNH 5768 (the largest complete armor of D. terrelli with a skull length of 61.3 cm (24.1 in)) or CMNH 5936 (the largest known jaw fragment). Additionally, these reconstructions often require Dunkleosteus to lack many features consistent across the body plans of other arthrodires like Coccosteus and Amazichthys.

The most extensive analyses of body size and shape in Dunkleosteus terrelli produce length estimates of ~3.4 metres (11 ft) for typical adults of this species, with very rare and exceptional individuals potentially reaching lengths of 4.1 metres (13 ft). These estimates were calculated using several different size proxies (head length, orbit-opercular length [head length minus snout length], ventral shield length, entering angle, locations of the pectoral and pelvic girdles relative to total length), which produce largely similar results. Statistical margins of error in these methods mean lengths as great as 3.7 metres (12 ft) in typical adults and 4.5 metres (15 ft) for exceptional individuals remain possible, but greater lengths result in proportions largely outside what is seen in other arthrodires and jawed fishes more generally, especially in terms of the size of the head and trunk armor relative to the total length of the animal and the relative location of the pectoral and pelvic fins. Indeed, the implied proportions under the upper ranges of the margins of error suggest even those lengths may be overly generous. Lengths at the lower end of the margins of error are unlikely given the preserved lengths of the head and trunk armor.

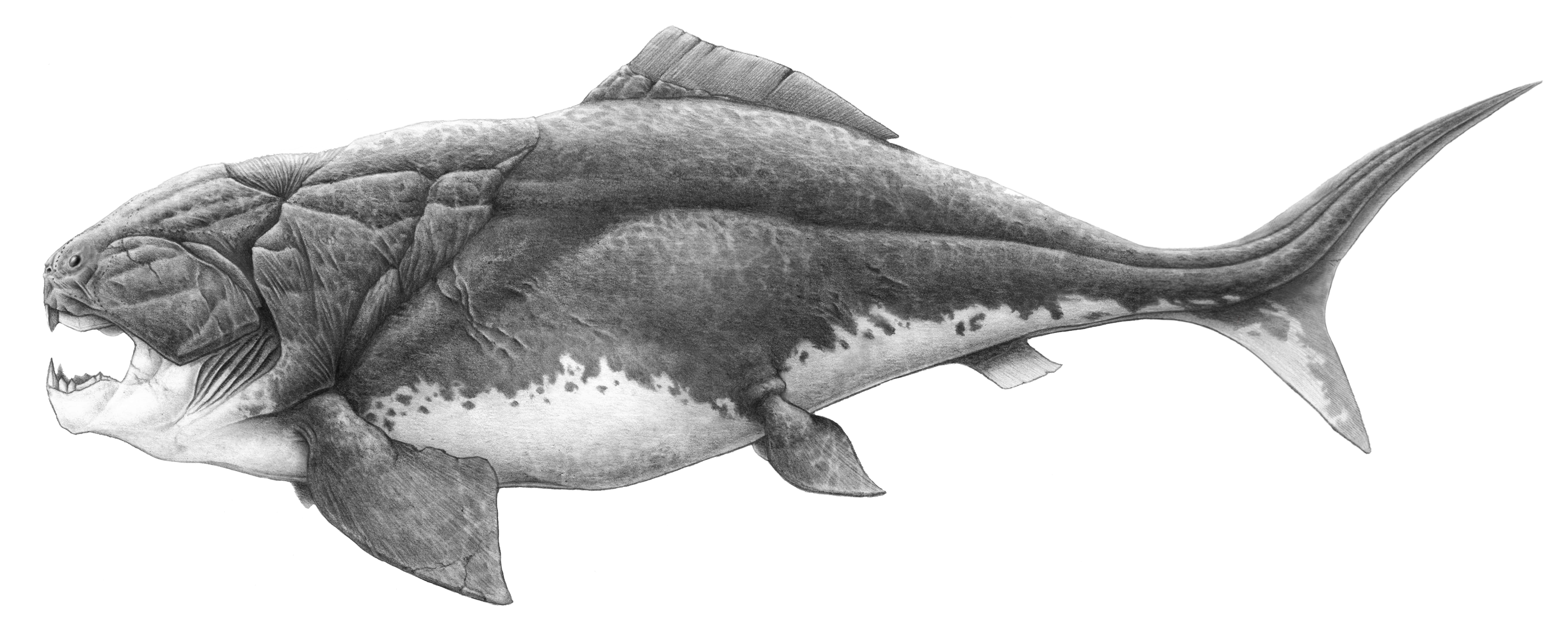
Life reconstruction of D. terrelli, as presented by Ferrón et al. 2017

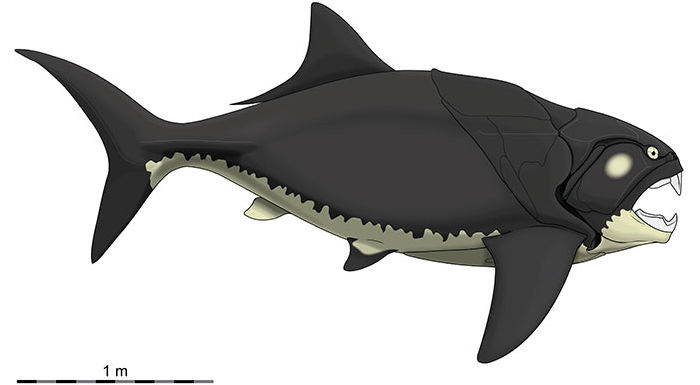
Life reconstruction of D. terrelli, as presented by Engelman in 2024

life reconstruction of dunkleosteus terrelli

Most studies with well-defined methods produce lengths of 5 metres (16 ft) or less for Dunkleosteus terrelli, with the exception of Ferrón et al. (2017), which produces larger estimates of 6.88–8.79 metres (22.6–28.8 ft) based on upper jaw perimeter of modern sharks. However, arthrodires have proportionally larger mouths than modern sharks, making the lengths estimated by Ferrón et al. (2017) unreliable. Upper jaw perimeter overestimates the size of complete arthrodires like Coccosteus and the estimates of Ferrón et al. (2017) result in Dunkleosteus having an extremely small head and hyper-elongate trunk relative to the known dimensions of the fossils. The reconstruction presented in Ferrón et al. (2017) is also incorrectly scaled to the known dimensions of the fossil material; if scaled to the size of CMNH 5768, it produces a length of 3.77 metres (12.4 ft), agreeing with the shorter estimates in later studies.

Carr (2010) estimated a 4.6 metres (15 ft) long adult individual of Dunkleosteus terrelli to have weighed 665 kilograms (1,466 lb), assuming a shark-like body plan and a similar length-weight relationship. Engelman (2023), using an ellipsoid volumetric method, estimated weights of 950–1,200 kilograms (2,090–2,650 lb) for typical (3.41 metres (11.2 ft) long) adult Dunkleosteus, and weights of 1,494–1,764 kilograms (3,294–3,889 lb) for the largest (4.1 metres (13.5 ft) in this study) individual. The higher weights by Engelman (2023) are mostly a result of the fact that arthrodires tend to have relatively deeper and wider bodies compared to sharks.

An exceptionally preserved specimen of D. terrelli preserves a pectoral fin outline with ceratotrichia, implying that the fin morphology of placoderms was much more variable than previously thought, and was heavily influenced by locomotory requirements. This knowledge, coupled with the knowledge that fish morphology is more heavily influenced by feeding niche than phylogeny, allowed a 2017 study to infer the caudal fin shape of D. terrelli, reconstructing this fin with a strong ventral lobe, a high aspect ratio, narrow caudal peduncle, in contrast to previous reconstructions based on the anguilliform caudal fin of coccosteomorph placoderms.

The only vertebral remains known for Dunkleosteus are a small series of 16 vertebrae within the trunk armor of the specimen CMNH 50322. Most of these vertebrae are highly fused, and have very prominent, laterally-projecting articular facets compared to other arthrodires. Although many arthrodires show the incorporation of anterior vertebrae into a synarcual, in these species the fused region is small whereas the fused region of Dunkleosteus extends almost to the end of the trunk armor, which would make its spine very stiff. This, along with a ridge on the inside of the trunk armor suggesting an unusually well-developed attachment for the horizontal septum, suggests Dunkleosteus may have had an anteriorly stiffened spine and specialized connective tissues to transmit force generated by the anterior trunk muscles to the tail fin, similar to thunniform vertebrates like lamnids and tunas.

The pelvic girdle of Dunkleosteus is relatively small relative to the overall size of the armor. Several specimens preserve associated pelvic girdles, but their original position was not recorded during preservation. However, because these specimens were excavated from cliff faces, they were probably found in close to the armor, suggesting these fins were associated with the end of the ventral shield as in other arthrodires. One specimen may preserve pelvic fin basals near the end of the trunk armor.

==== Length estimations of D. terrelli ====
Length estimates of Dunkleosteus terrelli (modified from Table 7 of Engelman 2023)
Study (author)	Year	Length	Method	Reference
Newberry	1875	4.5–5.5 metres (15–18 ft)	Extrapolated from Coccosteus cuspidatus, measurements and specimen used unclear	
Newberry	1889	4.5 metres (15 ft)	Unstated (implied extrapolation from Coccosteus)	
Dean	1895	3 metres (9.8 ft)	Methods, measurements, and specimens unstated	
Hussakof	1905	1.67 metres (5.5 ft) (AMNH FF 195); 3.79 metres (12.4 ft) (extrapolated to CMNH 5768 by Engelman 2023 assuming similar head-trunk proportions)	Entering angle of body	
Anonymous	1923	7.6 metres (25 ft)	Methods, measurements, and specimens used not stated	
Hyde	1926	4.5–6 metres (15–20 ft)	Methods, measurements, and specimens used not stated	
Romer	1966	9 metres (30 ft)	Methods, measurements, and specimens used not stated	
Colbert	1969	9 metres (30 ft)	Methods, measurements, and specimens used not stated	
Denison	1978	6 metres (20 ft)	Methods, measurements, and specimens used not stated	
Williams	1992	5 metres (16 ft)	Methods, measurements, and specimens used not stated	
Janvier	2003	6–7 metres (20–23 ft)	Methods, measurements, and specimens used not stated	
Young	2003	6 metres (20 ft)	Methods, measurements, and specimens used not stated	
Anderson and Westneat	2007	6 metres (20 ft)	Methods, measurements, and specimens used not stated	
Anderson and Westneat	2009	10 metres (33 ft)	Methods, measurements, and specimens used not stated	
Carr	2010	4.5–6 metres (15–20 ft)	Methods, measurements, and specimens used not stated	
Long	2010	4.5–8 metres (15–26 ft)	Methods, measurements, and specimens used not stated	
Sallan and Galimberti	2015	8 metres (26 ft)	Methods, measurements, and specimens used not stated	
Ferrón et al.	2017	6.88 metres (22.6 ft) (average adult, CMNH 5768); 8.79 metres (28.8 ft) (largest individual, CMNH 5936)	Upper jaw perimeter	
Long et al.	2019	6–8 metres (20–26 ft)	Methods, measurements, and specimens used not stated	
Johanson et al.	2019	3 metres (9.8 ft) (CMNH 50322); 7.1 metres (23 ft) (extrapolated to CMNH 5768 by Engelman 2023 assuming similar head-trunk proportions)	Methods and measurements not stated	
Engelman	2023	3.41 metres (11.2 ft) (average adult, CMNH 5768); 4.1 metres (13.5 ft) (largest individual, CMNH 5936)	Orbit-opercular length (head length minus snout)	
Engelman	2023	3.41 metres (11.2 ft) (average adult, CMNH 5768)	Skull length in Coccosteus	
Engelman	2023	5.23 metres (17.2 ft) (average adult, CMNH 5768)	Infragnathal length in Coccosteus (source considers this estimate unreliable due to Dunkleosteus having a relatively larger mouth than Coccosteus)	
Engelman	2023	3.47 metres (11.4 ft) (average adult, CMNH 5768)	Entering angle of body	
Engelman	2023	3.88 metres (12.7 ft) (average adult, CMNH 5768)	Length of posteroventrolateral plate	
Engelman	2023	3.40 metres (11.2 ft) (average adult, CMNH 5768)	Inferred location of pelvic girdle	

== Paleobiology ==
=== Diet ===
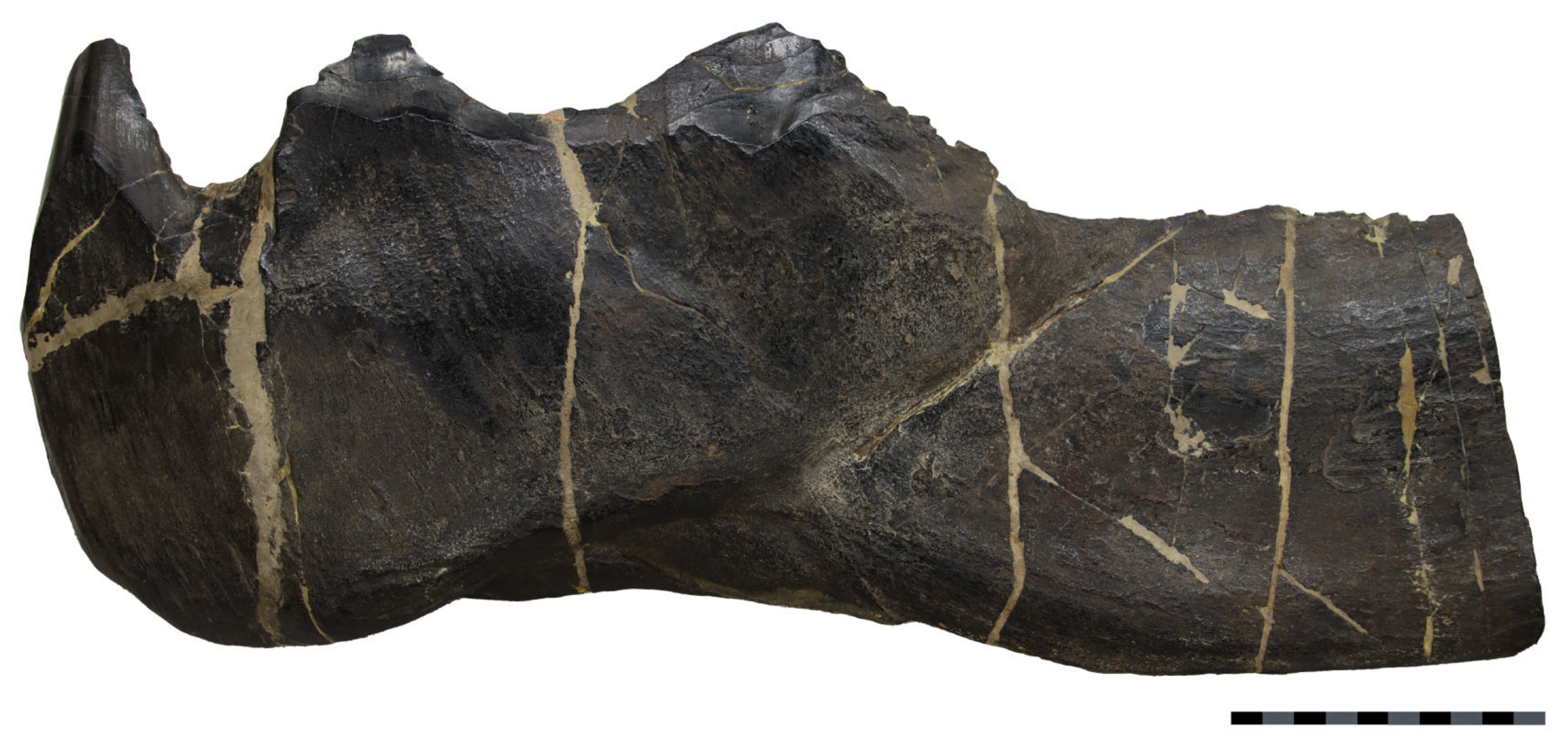
Partial lower jaw of CMNH 5936, the largest known individual of Dunkleosteus terrelli. Scale = 10 cm.

Dunkleosteus terrelli possessed a four-bar linkage mechanism for jaw opening that incorporated connections between the skull, the thoracic shield, the lower jaw and the jaw muscles joined by movable joints. Based on biomechanical modelling, Anderson and Westneat suggested that this mechanism allowed D. terrelli to both achieve a high speed of jaw opening, opening their jaws in 20 milliseconds and completing the whole process in 50–60 milliseconds (comparable to modern fishes that use suction feeding to assist in prey capture) and producing high bite forces when closing the jaw, estimated at 4,414 N (450 kg_{f}; 992 lb_{f}) at the tip and 5,363 N (547 kg_{f}; 1,206 lb_{f}) at the blade edge, or even up to 6,170 N (629 kg_{f}; 1,387 lb_{f}) and 7,495 N (764 kg_{f}; 1,685 lb_{f}) respectively, which would be considered the highest of any living or fossil fish, and among the highest of any animal. They further claimed that pressures generated in those regions were high enough to puncture or cut through cuticle or dermal armor, suggesting that D. terrelli was adapted to prey on free-swimming, armored prey such as ammonites and other placoderms.

In 2025, Engelman and colleagues questioned the suction feeding hypothesis, criticizing that the assumptions behind these models do not accurately reflect the anatomy of D. terrelli. They suggested that the blade-like dentition of Dunkleosteus are similar to predatory fish that actively pursue and orally process their prey (i.e. bite with a wide gape and tear the prey into pieces), unlike the extant and extinct suction feeding gnathostomes (jawed vertebrates), which have a limited gape and villiform (densely packed) tooth patches or similar structures on their mouthparts without large piercing structures for oral processing. They further argued that many modern suction feeders possess structures that restrict their mouth opening, as having large mouths like Dunkleosteus would decrease effective suction force. Additionally, they noted that Dunkleosteus lived in an open water environment, where suction feeding on larger prey is mostly unreliable due to suction resistance. Engelman et al. (2025) also suggested that the skull of Dunkleosteus was composed of more cartilage than previously assumed, including most major jaw connections and muscle attachment sites which would have allowed to widely open its jaws with a gape angle of at least 65–70°, and that the previous bite force estimates may require re-examination based on this anatomical revision.

The teeth of a chondrichthyan thought to belong to Orodus (Orodus spp.) were found in association with Dunkleosteus remains, suggesting that these were probably stomach contents regurgitated from the animal. Orodus is thought to be tachypelagic, or a fast-swimming pelagic fish. Thus, Dunkleosteus might have been fast enough to catch these fast organisms, and not a slow swimmer like originally thought. Fossils of Dunkleosteus are frequently found with boluses of fish bones, semi-digested and partially eaten remains of other fish. As a result, the fossil record indicates it may have routinely regurgitated prey bones rather than digest them. Mature individuals probably inhabited deep sea locations, like other placoderms, living in shallow waters during adolescence. In addition, a specimen of Dunkleosteus (CMNH 5302), and Titanichthys (CMNH 9889), show damage said to be puncture damage from the bony fangs of other Dunkleosteus.

=== Reproduction ===
Dunkleosteus, together with most other placoderms, may have also been among the first vertebrates to internalize egg fertilization, as seen in some modern sharks. Some other placoderms have been found with evidence that they may have been viviparous, including what appears to have been an umbilical cord.

=== Growth ===
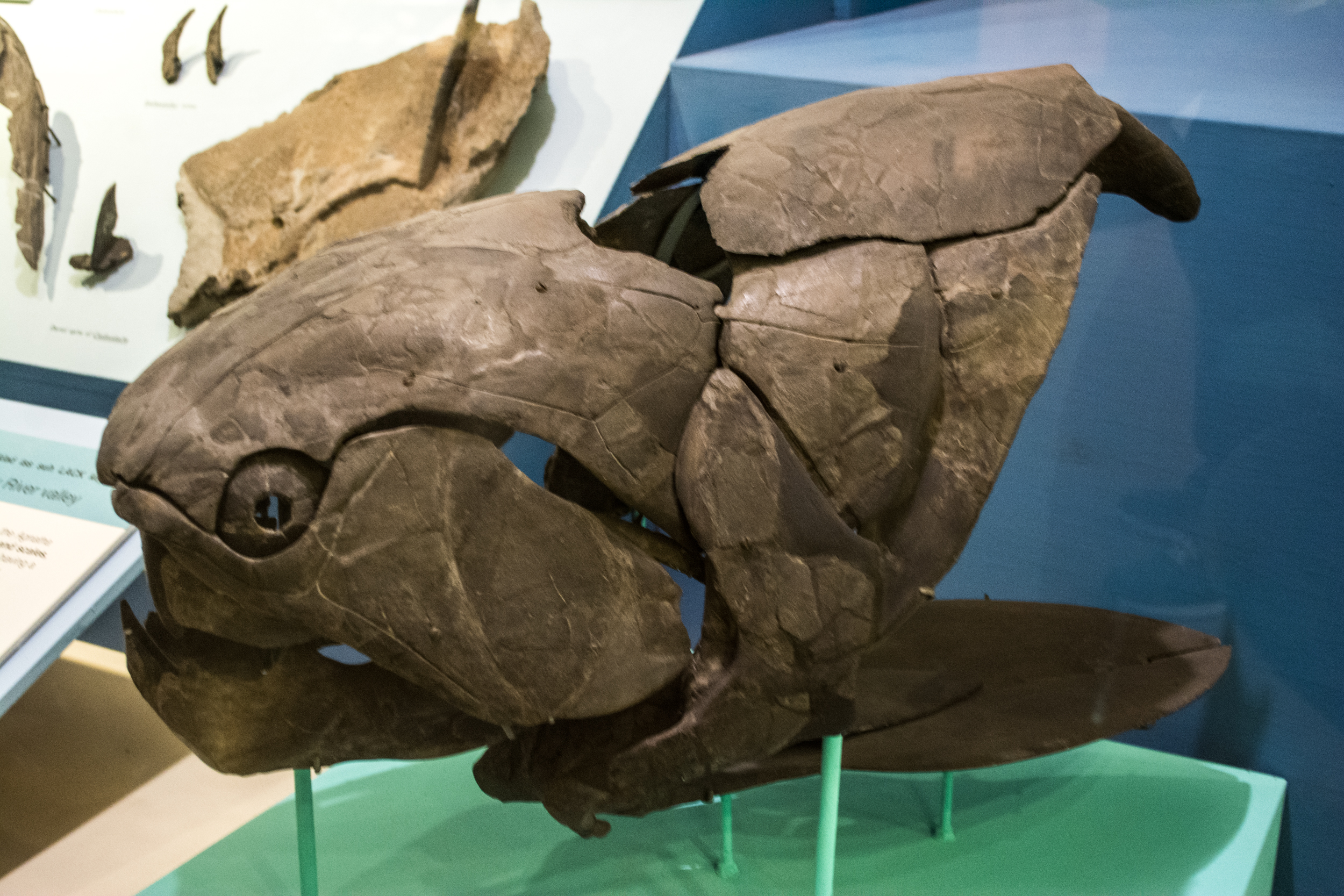
D. terrelli juvenile specimen CMNH 7424

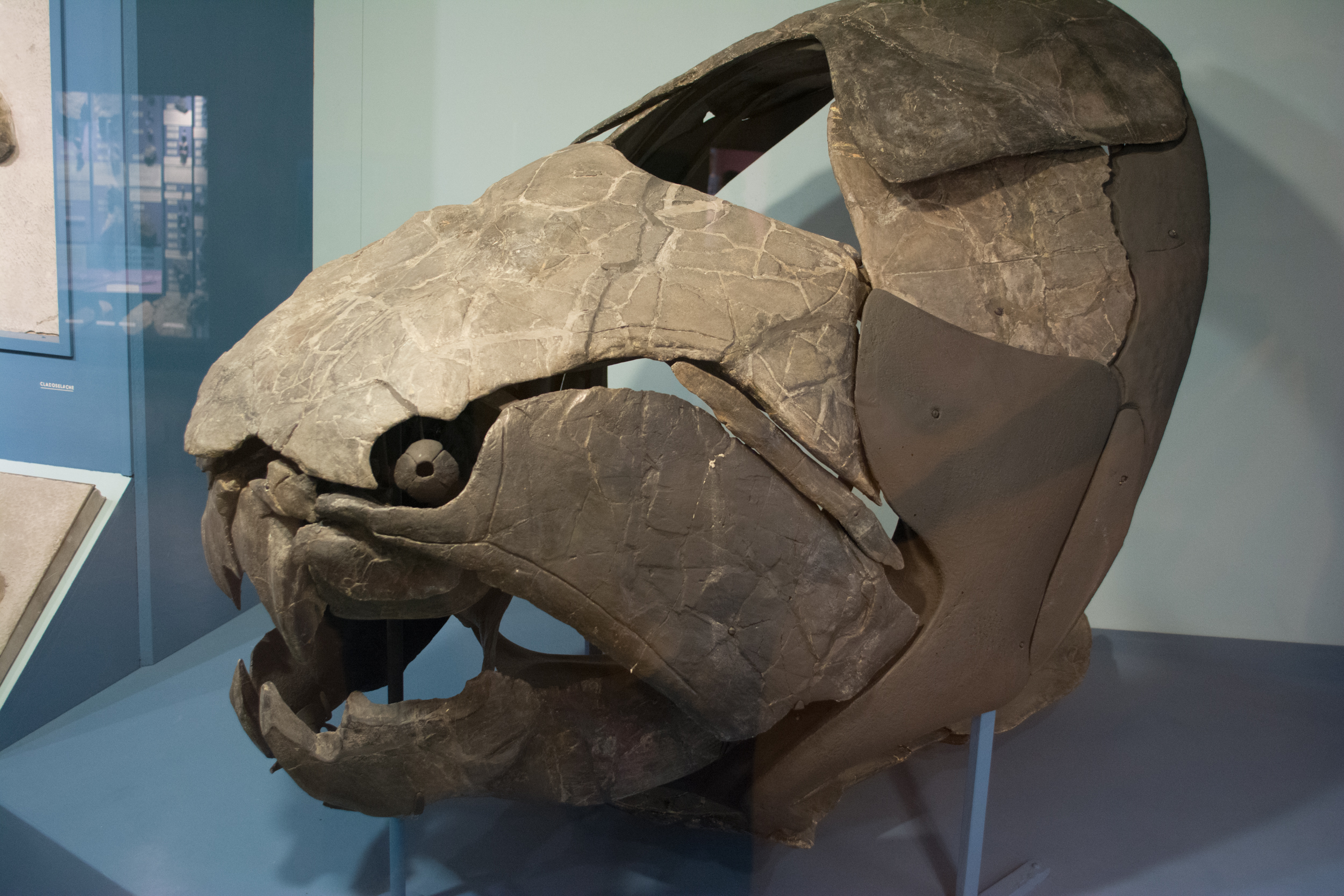
D. terrelli adult specimen CMNH 5768

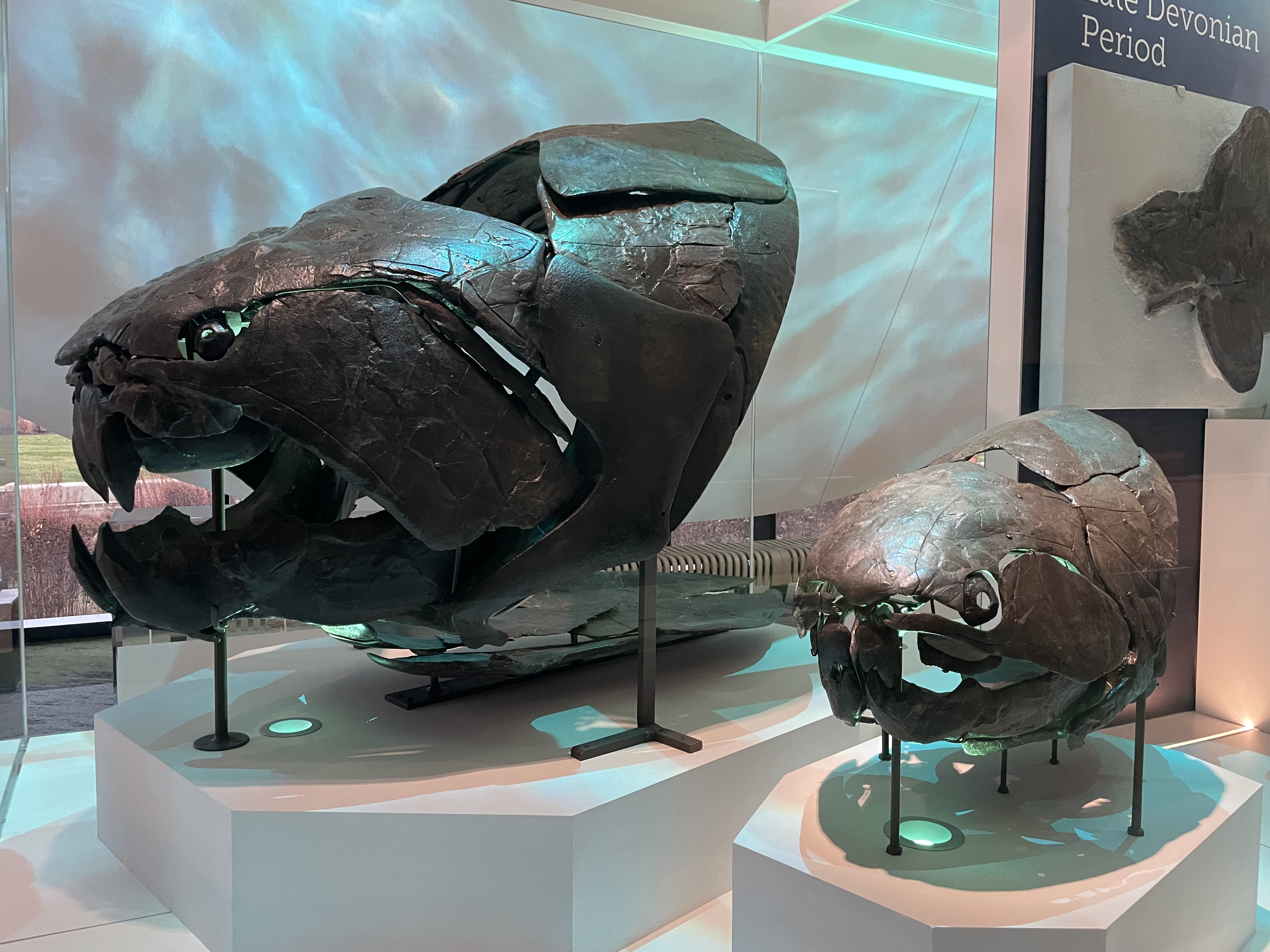
Adult and juvenile D. terrelli specimens side by side

Morphological studies on the lower jaws of juveniles of D. terrelli reveal they were proportionally as robust as those of adults, indicating they already could produce high bite forces and likely were able to shear into resistant prey tissue similar to adults, albeit on a smaller scale. This pattern is in direct contrast to the condition common in tetrapods in which the jaws of juveniles are more gracile than in adults.

== See also ==
- List of placoderms
