= Sea of Monsters (disambiguation) =

"Sea of Monsters" is an instrumental orchestral piece conducted and composed by George Martin for the 1968 film Yellow Submarine.

Sea of Monsters or The Sea of Monsters may also refer to:

- The Sea of Monsters, a fantasy-adventure novel the Percy Jackson series
  - Percy Jackson: Sea of Monsters, the film adaptation of the Percy Jackson novel

== See also ==
- Sea Monsters (disambiguation)
- Monster (disambiguation)
- Sea (disambiguation)
