= Driscollaspis =

Driscollaspis Temporal range: Late Devonian

Scientific classification
- Kingdom: Animalia
- Phylum: Chordata
- Class: †Placodermi
- Order: †Arthrodira
- Suborder: †Brachythoraci
- Family: †Selenosteidae
- Genus: †Driscollaspis
- Species: †D. pankowskiorum

Binomial name
- †Driscollaspis pankowskiorum Rücklin et al., 2015

Extinct genus of fishes

Driscollaspis is an extinct genus of selenosteid that lived during the Late Devonian epoch.

== Distribution ==
Driscollapsis pankowskiorum is known from fossils discovered in Morocco.
