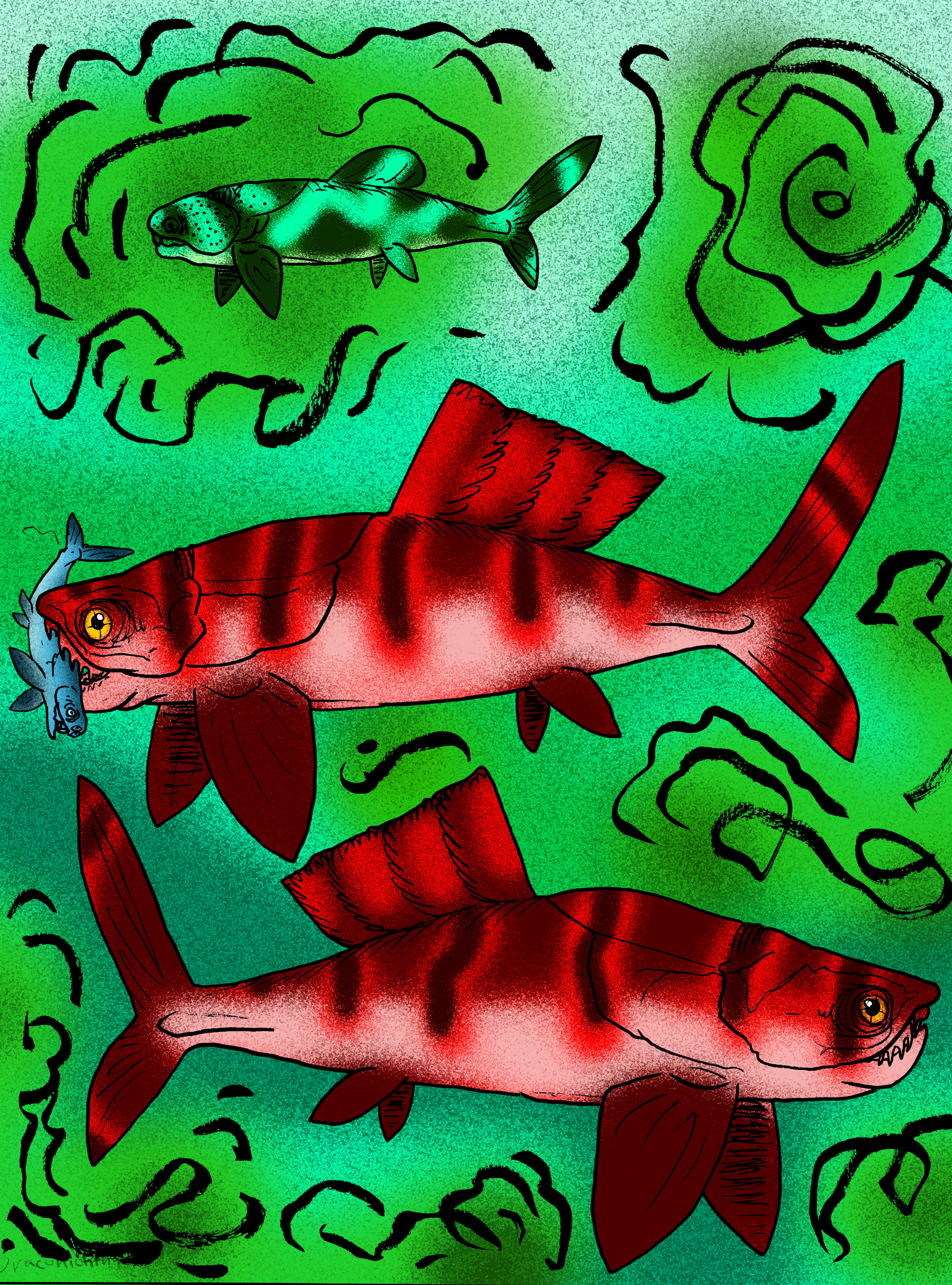
- Artist's reconstruction

Scientific classification
- Domain: Eukaryota
- Kingdom: Animalia
- Phylum: Chordata
- Class: †Placodermi
- Order: †Arthrodira
- Suborder: †Brachythoraci
- Family: †Selenosteidae
- Genus: †Draconichthys; Rücklin, 2011
- Species: †D. elegans

Binomial name
- †Draconichthys elegans Rücklin, 2011

= Draconichthys =

Draconichthys Temporal range: Late Frasnian

Draconichthys elegans (meaning "elegant dragon fish") a selenosteid arthrodire placoderm from the Late Frasnian Kellwasserkalk facies of the Anti-Atlas Mountains of what is now Morocco. During the Late Devonian, the region would have been a shallow, algae-dimmed sea.

Draconichthys elegans differs from all other selenosteids in the structure of its gnathal plates, which are comparatively large, and have long teeth-like prongs. This feature strongly suggests that it was a predatory animal, and used its pronged gnathal plates to prevent seized prey from squirming out of its mouth. The anatomy of its skull, however, is otherwise very typical of selenosteids, being very similar to the genera Enseosteus, Rhinosteus, and Walterosteus. D. elegans is currently known from a single skull about 112 millimetres in length.
