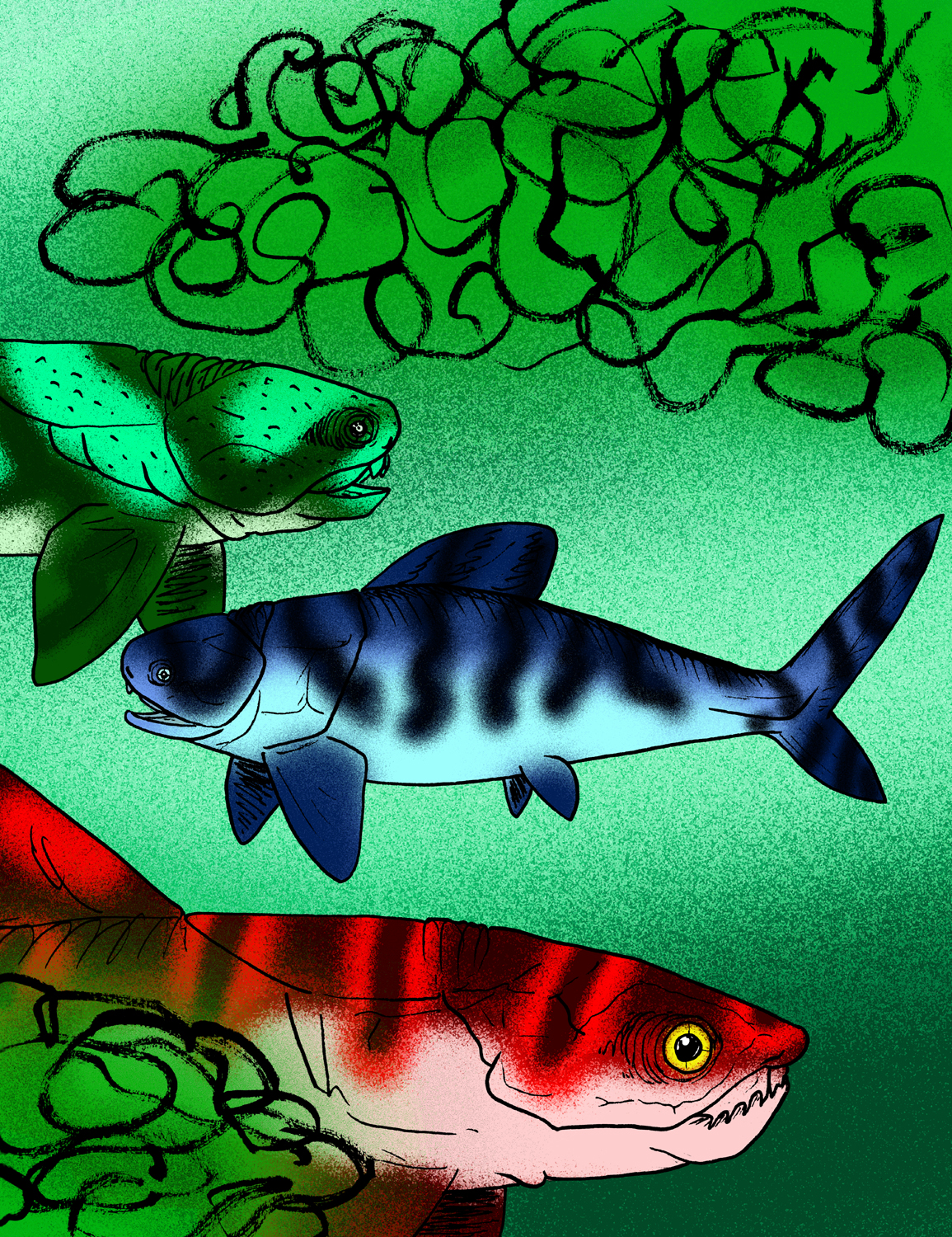
- Driscollichthys, Amazichthys, Draconichthys

Scientific classification
- Kingdom: Animalia
- Phylum: Chordata
- Class: †Placodermi
- Order: †Arthrodira
- Suborder: †Brachythoraci
- Clade: †Eubrachythoraci
- Clade: †Pachyosteomorphi
- Clade: †Aspinothoracidi
- Family: †Selenosteidae; Dean, 1901

Type species
- Selenosteus brevis (Claypole), 1869

Genera
- Amazichthys; Brachyosteus; Braunosteus; Draconichthys; Enseosteus; Gorgonichthys?; Gymnotrachelus; Heintzichthys; Melanosteus; Microsteus; Pachyosteus; Paramylostoma; Phymosteus; Rhinosteus; Selenosteus (type genus); Stenosteus; Walterosteus

Synonyms
- Pachyosteidae Gross, 1932; Braunosteidae Stensiö, 1959; Rhinosteidae Stensiö, 1963

= Selenosteidae =

Selenosteidae Temporal range: Late Devonian, 382.7–358.9 Ma

Extinct family of fishes

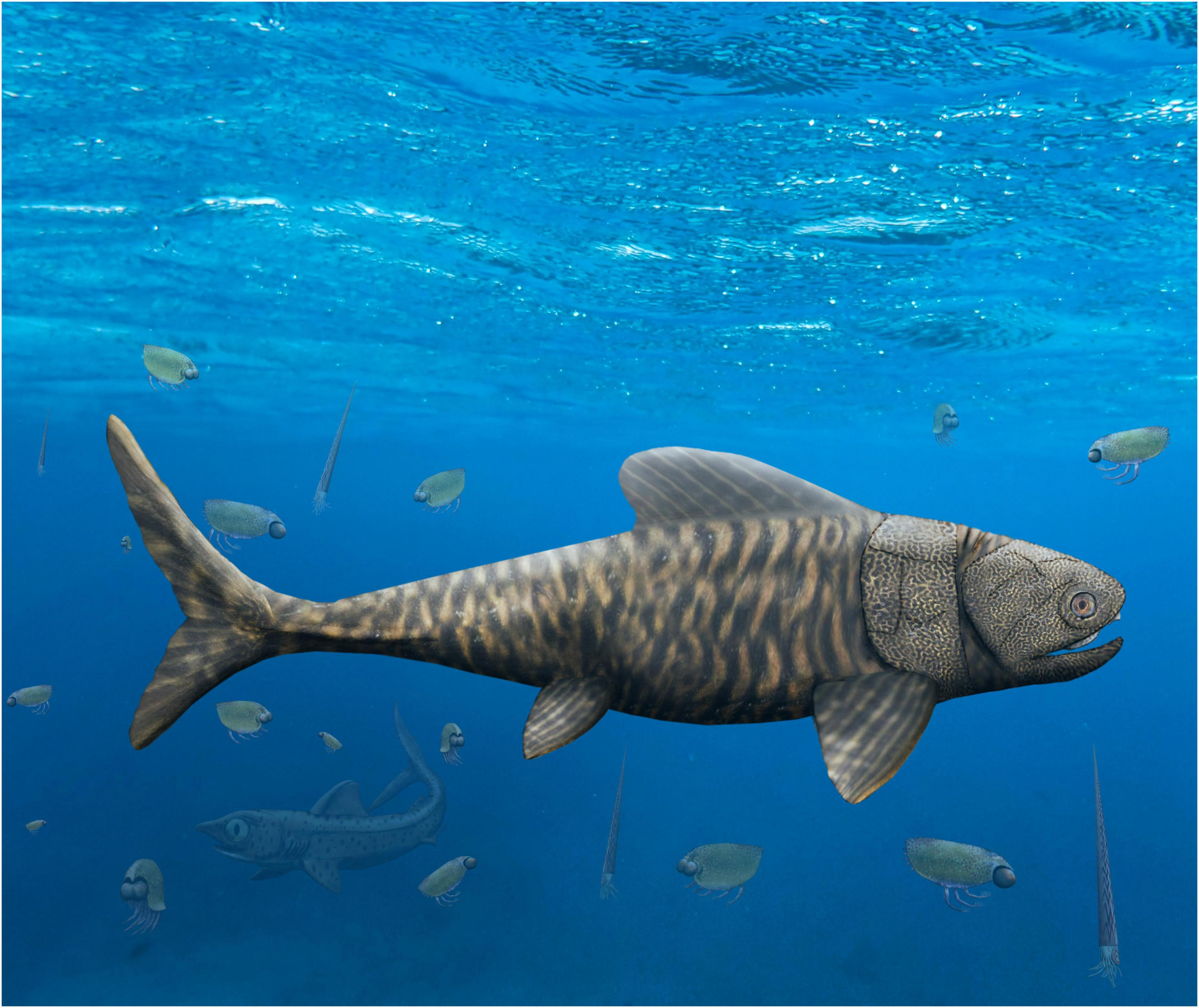
Life restoration of Amazichthys

Selenosteidae is an extinct family of small to large-sized arthrodire placoderms from the Late Devonian. With the exception of the Chinese Phymosteus, selenosteids lived in shallow seas in what is now Eastern North America (the Cleveland Shale), Eastern Europe (Holy Cross Mountains, Poland, and the Kellwasserkalk fauna of Bad Wildungen), and Northeastern Africa (the Anti-Atlas Mountains, Morocco).

Selenosteids have, in cross section, a rounded body, a blunt snout, and tremendous orbits. The lower jaws were slender, the inferognathals usually either being finely serrated, or adapted for crushing, though, in Draconichthys, the inferognathals had long prongs for seizing prey. The rostrum is very small.

== Taxonomy ==
Selenosteidae is a member of the clade Aspinothoracidi, which belongs to the clade Pachyosteomorphi, one of the two major clades within Eubrachythoraci. Gorgonichthys is closely related to the family Selenosteidae, and could possibly be included in the family. The cladogram below shows the placement of Selenosteidae within Eubrachythoraci:

- Eubrachythoraci
  - Coccosteomorphi
  - Pachyosteomorphi
    - Rhachiosteus pterygiatus
    - - Dunkleosteoidea
        - Eastmanosteus calliaspis
        - - - Eastmanosteus pustulosus
            - Kiangyousteus yohii
          - - Golshanichthys asiatica
            - - Westralichthys uwagedensis
              - - - Dunkleosteus raveri
                  - Dunkleosteus terrelli
                - - Dunkleosteus amblyodoratus
                  - Heterostiidae
                    - Heterosteus ingens
                    - Yinosteus major
      - Aspinothoracidi
        - Tapinosteus heintzi
        - - - Bullerichthys fascidens
            - - Kendrickichthys cavernosus
              - Bruntonichthys multidens
          - - Dinichthys herzeri
            - - Hadrosteus rapax
              - - Gorgonichthys clarki
                - Selenosteidae
                  - Heintzichthys gouldii
                  - Pachyosteus bulla
                  - Gymnotrachelus hydei
                  - Stenosteus angustopectus
                  - Brachyosteus dietrichi
                  - - Melanosteus occitanus
                    - Rhinosteus parvulus

Below is a more detailed cladogram of Selenosteidae, from Rücklin (2011):

- Aspinothoracidi
  - Parabelosteus
  - Brachydeirus
  - Selenosteidae
    - Pachyosteus
    - - - Selenosteus
        - - Stenosteus
          - Gymnotrachelus
      - - Microsteus
        - - Walterosteus
          - - Draconichthys
            - Enseosteus
            - - Melanosteus
              - Rhinosteus

Denison (1978) separated Selenosteidae into two informal groups, the "American" genera (i.e., those taxa from the Upper Famennian Cleveland Shales, such as Selenosteus and Gymnotrachelus), and the "European" genera (i.e., those taxa from the Upper Frasnian Kellwasserkalk facies of Germany, and later, Morocco, like Rhinosteus and Microsteus). Denison notes that the differences between the two groups, such as how the American genera tend to have slightly smaller orbits, and slightly longer cheeks, may suggest the similarities between them are due to parallel evolution.

Rücklin (2011), on the other hand, places Pachyosteus as the most basal selenosteid, then groups the American genera (with Selenosteus grouped as the sister taxon of Gymnotrachelus and Stenosteus) as being the sister group of the remaining European/Kellwasserkalk genera, plus Draconichthys.

== See also ==
- List of placoderms
