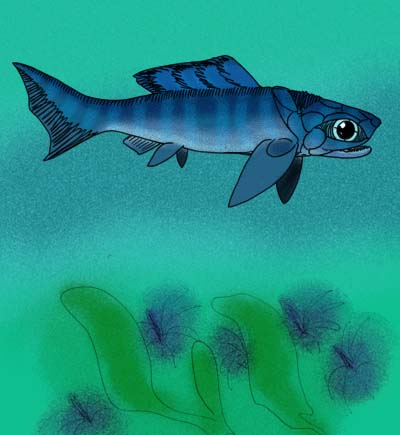
- Artist's reconstruction

Scientific classification
- Kingdom: Animalia
- Phylum: Chordata
- Class: †Placodermi
- Order: †Arthrodira
- Suborder: †Brachythoraci
- Family: †Selenosteidae
- Genus: †Selenosteus; Dean, 1901
- Species: †S. brevis

Binomial name
- †Selenosteus brevis (Claypole, 1869)

Synonyms
- Titanichthys brevis Claypole, 1869; Selenosteus kepleri Dean, 1901

= Selenosteus =

Selenosteus Temporal range: ?Frasnian to Famennian

Extinct genus of fishes

Selenosteus brevis is an extinct large selenosteid arthrodire placoderm known from the Famennian Cleveland Shale of Ohio. Scrappy remains from the Frasnian Rhinestreet Shales of Erie County, New York, were attributed by Hussakof and Bryant to this genus in 1919, but, this identification is doubtful. A second species, S. kepleri, was described in 1901, but, not enough differences can be seen between its specimens, and those of the type species to warrant new species status.

According to its generally scrappy fossils, S. brevis had a wide skull with tremendous orbits. And as typical for selenosteids, S. brevis had weak gnathal plates. The median dorsal plate is crescent-shaped, and has a keel. The average length of the skull is about 16 centimetres from the tip of the rostrum to the posterior border of the nuchal plate.
