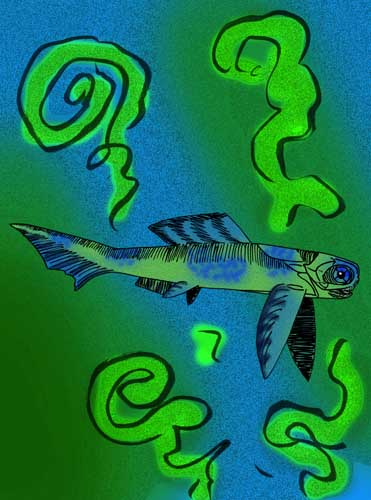
- Walterosteus lelievrei

Scientific classification
- Kingdom: Animalia
- Phylum: Chordata
- Class: †Placodermi
- Order: †Arthrodira
- Suborder: †Brachythoraci
- Family: †Selenosteidae
- Genus: †Walterosteus; Stensiö, 1959

Type species
- Walterosteus pachyostoides Stensiö 1959

Species
- W. pachyostoides Stensiö 1959; W. grossi (Maish, 1998); W. lelievrei Rücklin 2011

Synonyms
- Wildungenichthys grossi Maish, 1998

= Walterosteus =

Walterosteus Temporal range: Late Frasnian

Extinct genus of fishes

Walterosteus is an extinct genus of small selenosteid arthrodire placoderms known from the Upper Frasnian Kellwasserkalk facies of Late Devonian Germany and Morocco.

Walterosteus is very similar to the other Kellwasserkalk selenosteids. This similarity lead Denison (1978) to synonymize the genus, together with Ottonosteus (O. jaekeli = E. hermanni), into Enseosteus, claiming that the former two genera are too similar to Enseosteus to merit separate genus status. Rücklin (2011) agrees with Denison's synonymizing of Ottonosteus, but rejects Denison's synonymization of Walterosteus, claiming how Walterosteus has a contact between the rostral plate and the pineal plate, which Enseosteus does not.

== Etymology ==
The genus was named by Erik Stensiö to commemorate the contributions done by Walter Gross, a German specialist on Paleozoic fishes, and his important contributions to the understanding of the overall anatomy of arthrodire placoderms.
