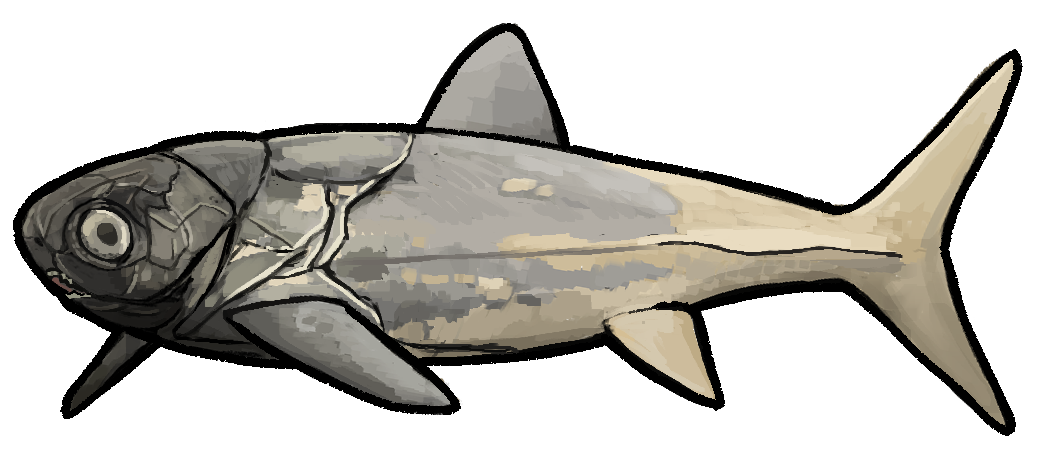
- Enseosteus marocanensis

Scientific classification
- Kingdom: Animalia
- Phylum: Chordata
- Class: †Placodermi
- Order: †Arthrodira
- Suborder: †Brachythoraci
- Family: †Selenosteidae
- Genus: †Enseosteus; Jaeckel, 1919

Type species
- Enseosteus jaekelli Gross, 1932

Species
- E. jaekelli Gross, 1932; E. hermanni Stensiö 1959; E. marocensis Rücklin, 2011

Synonyms
- Ottonosteus jaekeli Stensiö, 1959

= Enseosteus =

Enseosteus Temporal range: Late Frasnian

Extinct genus of fishes

Enseosteus is an extinct genus of small selenosteid arthrodire placoderms known from the Upper Frasnian Kellwasserkalk facies of Late Devonian Germany and Morocco.

Enseosteus is very similar to the other Kellwasserkalk selenosteids, though, the type species, E. jaekelli, has a bulbous, knob-shaped rostrum. Denison (1978) synonymizes the genera Ottonosteus (O. jaekeli = E. hermanni) and Walterosteus with Enseosteus, claiming that the two genera are too similar to Enseosteus to merit separate genus status. Rücklin (2011) agrees with Denison's synonymizing of Ottonosteus, but rejects Denison's synonymization of Walterosteus, claiming how Walterosteus has a contact between the rostral plate and the pineal plate, which Enseosteus does not.
