= Early Devonian =

First epoch/series of the Devonian

- 419.62 ± 1.36 – 393.47 ± 0.99 Ma
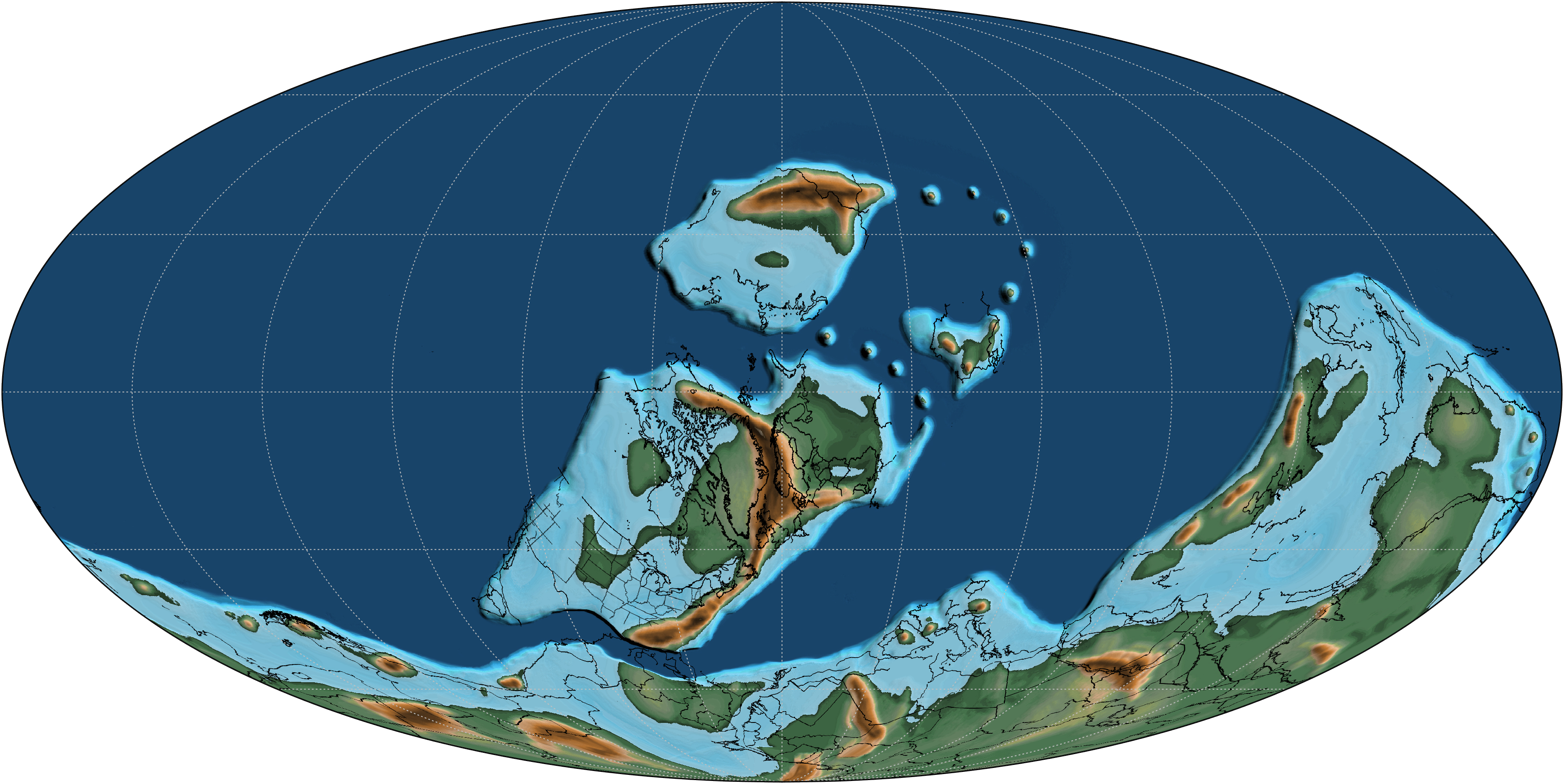
- A map of Earth as it appeared 405 million years ago during the Early Devonian Epoch, Emsian Age

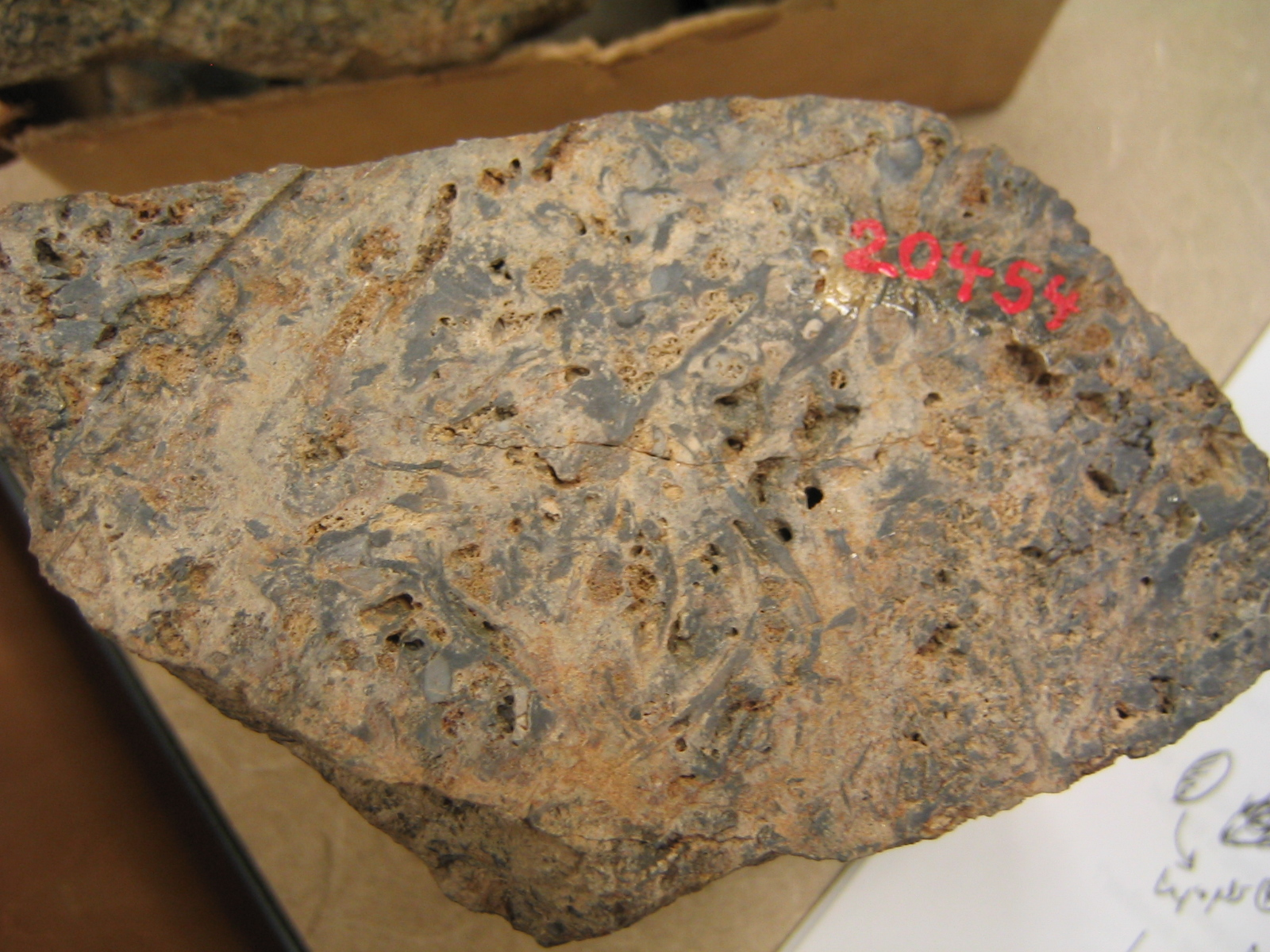
- Sample from the Lower Devonian Rhynie chert

Chronology
← / Hangenberg event, Famennian glaciation; ← / Kellwasser event (Late Devonian mass extinction); ← / Widespread shrubs & trees; ← / Hunsrück fauna; ← / Rhynie chert
Subdivision of the Devonian according to the ICS, as of 2023; Vertical axis scale: Millions of years ago

Etymology
- Chronostratigraphic name: Lower Devonian
- Geochronological name: Early Devonian
- Name formality: Formal

Usage information
- Celestial body: Earth
- Regional usage: Global (ICS)
- Time scale(s) used: ICS Time Scale

Definition
- Chronological unit: Epoch
- Stratigraphic unit: Series
- Time span formality: Formal
- Lower boundary definition: FAD of the graptolite Monograptus uniformis
- Lower boundary GSSP: Klonk, Czech Republic; 49.8550°N 13.7920°E
- Lower GSSP ratified: 1972
- Upper boundary definition: FAD of the conodont Polygnathus costatus partitus
- Upper boundary GSSP: Wetteldorf Richtschnitt section, Wetteldorf, Eifel, Germany; 50.1496°N 6.4716°E
- Upper GSSP ratified: 1985

The Early Devonian is the first of three epochs comprising the Devonian period, corresponding to the Lower Devonian series. It lasted from 419.62 ± 1.36 to 393.47 ± 0.99 and began with the Lochkovian Stage 419.62 ± 1.36 to 413.02 ± 0.99, which was followed by the Pragian from 413.02 ± 1.36 to 410.62 ± 0.99 and then by the Emsian, which lasted until the Middle Devonian began, 393.47± 0.99 million years ago. During this time, the first ammonoids appeared, descending from bactritoid nautiloids. Ammonoids during this time period were simple and differed little from their nautiloid counterparts. These ammonoids belong to the order Agoniatitida, which in later epochs evolved to new ammonoid orders, for example Goniatitida and Clymeniida. This class of cephalopod molluscs would dominate the marine fauna until the beginning of the Mesozoic Era.
