= Uchtites =

Uchtites Temporal range: Late Devonian

Scientific classification
- Kingdom: Animalia
- Phylum: Mollusca
- Class: Cephalopoda
- Subclass: †Ammonoidea
- Order: †Agoniatitida
- Family: †Acanthoclymeniidae
- Genus: †Uchtites; Bogoslovskii, 1958

Genus of molluscs (fossil)

Uchtites is a genus of ammonoid cephalopods included in the anarcestid family Acanthoclymeniidae that lived during the Devonian period. Its shell is lenticular, flat sided, with a tight umbilicus and sharp ventral keel bordered by weak nodules in adult specimens. The suture has a trifid ventral, rounded outer lateral, weak rounded inner lateral and wedge shaped dorsal lobe.

Acanthoclymenia, Gogocers, Nordiceras, and Ponticeras are related genera. The type species is Gephyroceras syrjanicum Holzapfel, 1899.
