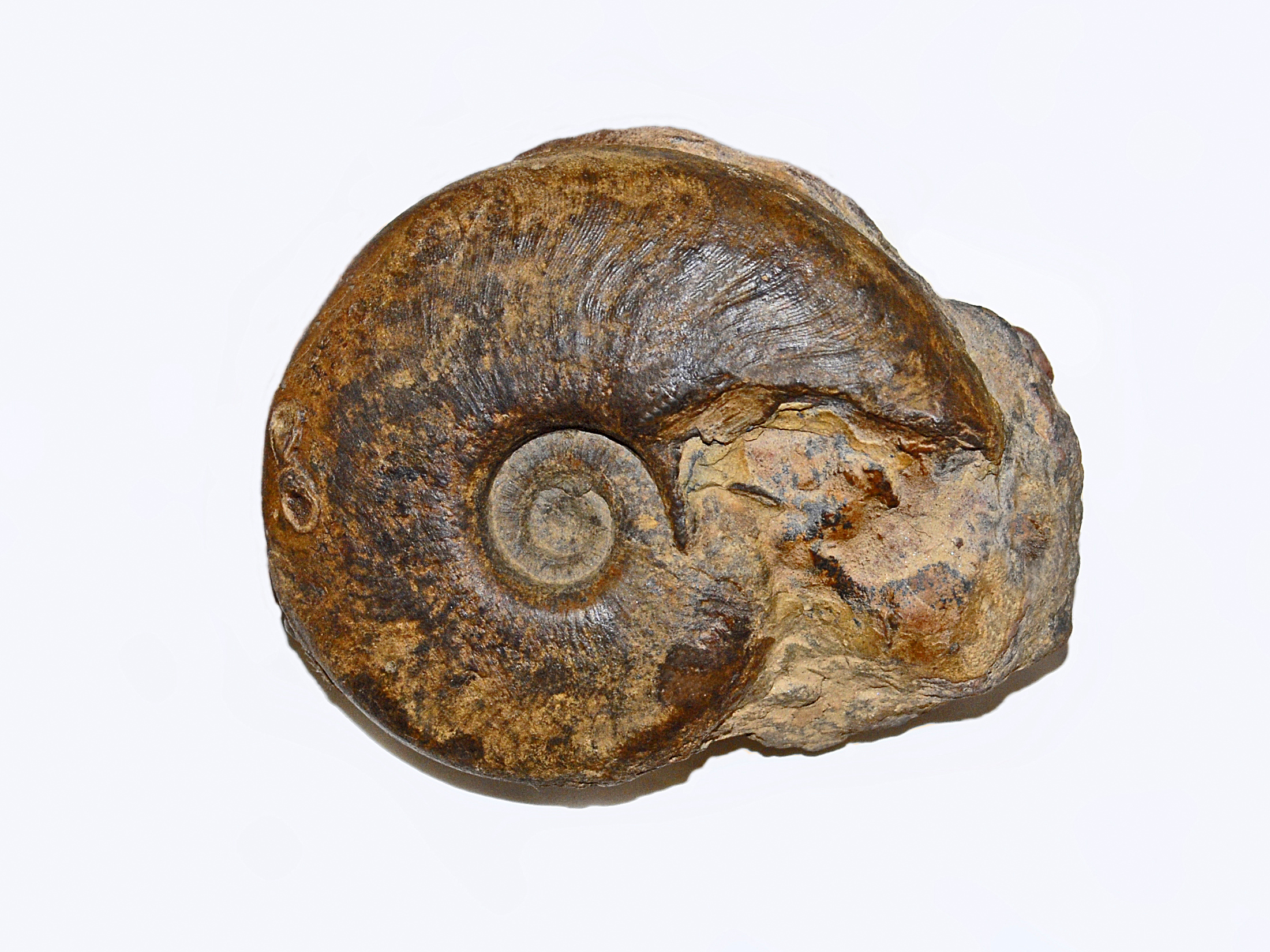
- Fossil of Beloceras sagittarium from Erfoud (Morocco)

Scientific classification
- Kingdom: Animalia
- Phylum: Mollusca
- Class: Cephalopoda
- Subclass: †Ammonoidea
- Order: †Agoniatitida
- Family: †Beloceratidae
- Genus: †Beloceras; Hyatt, 1884

= Beloceras =

Beloceras Temporal range: Devonian

Genus of ammonites included in the family Beloceratidae

Beloceras is a genus of ammonites included in the family Beloceratidae. These fast-moving nektonic carnivores lived in the Late Devonian period, from 379.5 to 376.1 Ma.

Similar and related genera include Eobeloceras, Mesobeloceras and Naplesites.

== Species ==
- Beloceras jorfense Korn et al. 2011
- Beloceras petterae Yatskov 1990
- Beloceras sagittarium Sandberger and Sandberger 1851
- Beloceras tenuistriatum d'Archiac and de Verneuil 1842
- Beloceras webbelense Korn et al. 2011

== Description ==
Beloceras species can reach a diameter of 9–13 centimetres (3.5–5.1 in). They are multilobate ammonoids, with a suture line composed up to 50 lobes.

== Distribution ==
Fossils of species within this genus have been found in the Devonian sediments of Australia, France, Germany, Morocco and Spain.
