= Acanthoclymenia =

Acanthoclymenia Temporal range: upper Givetian - lower Frasnian

Scientific classification
- Kingdom: Animalia
- Phylum: Mollusca
- Class: Cephalopoda
- Subclass: †Ammonoidea
- Order: †Agoniatitida
- Family: †Acanthoclymeniidae
- Genus: †Acanthoclymenia; Hyatt, 1900

Type species
- Acanthoclymenia neapolitana Clarke, 1898

Genus of ammonoid cephalopods belongs to Acanthoclymeniidae family

Acanthoclymenia is genus of ammonoid cephalopods belonging to the Acanthoclymeniidae family. Species belonging to this genus lived in middle and late Devonian (upper Givetian - lower Frasnian). Its fossils were found in Europe, Asia, north Africa, North America and Australia. Species of this genus had discoidal shells with flattened venter.

== Species and distribution ==
- Acanthoclymenia neapolitana Clarke, 1898: ca 383.7 - 376.1 mya of USA (New York) and Australia.
- Acanthoclymenia forcipifer Sandberger & Sandberger, 1851: ca 378.7 - 376.9 mya of Algeria, Germany, Great Britain Kazakhstan and China (Guangxi and Guizhou).
- Acanthoclymenia genundewa Clarke, 1899: ca 383.3 - 382.7 mya of USA (New York) and Poland.
- Acanthoclymenia planorbis Sandberger & Sandberger, 1851: ca 377.5 - 376.9 mya of USA (New York).

There were more finds of this genus, but without valid description:

- Acanthoclymenia aff. genundewa Clarke, 1898: ca 378.7 - 376.9 mya of USA (West Virginia) and Russia (Southern Timan).
- Acanthoclymenia aff. neapolitana Clarke, 1898: ca 383.7 - 376.1 mya of Australia.
- Acanthoclymenia n.sp. juv. Becker et al. 2000: ca 378.7 - 377.5 mya of Russia (Southern Timan).
