= Hangenberg event =

Mass extinction at the end of the Devonian

Hangenberg events
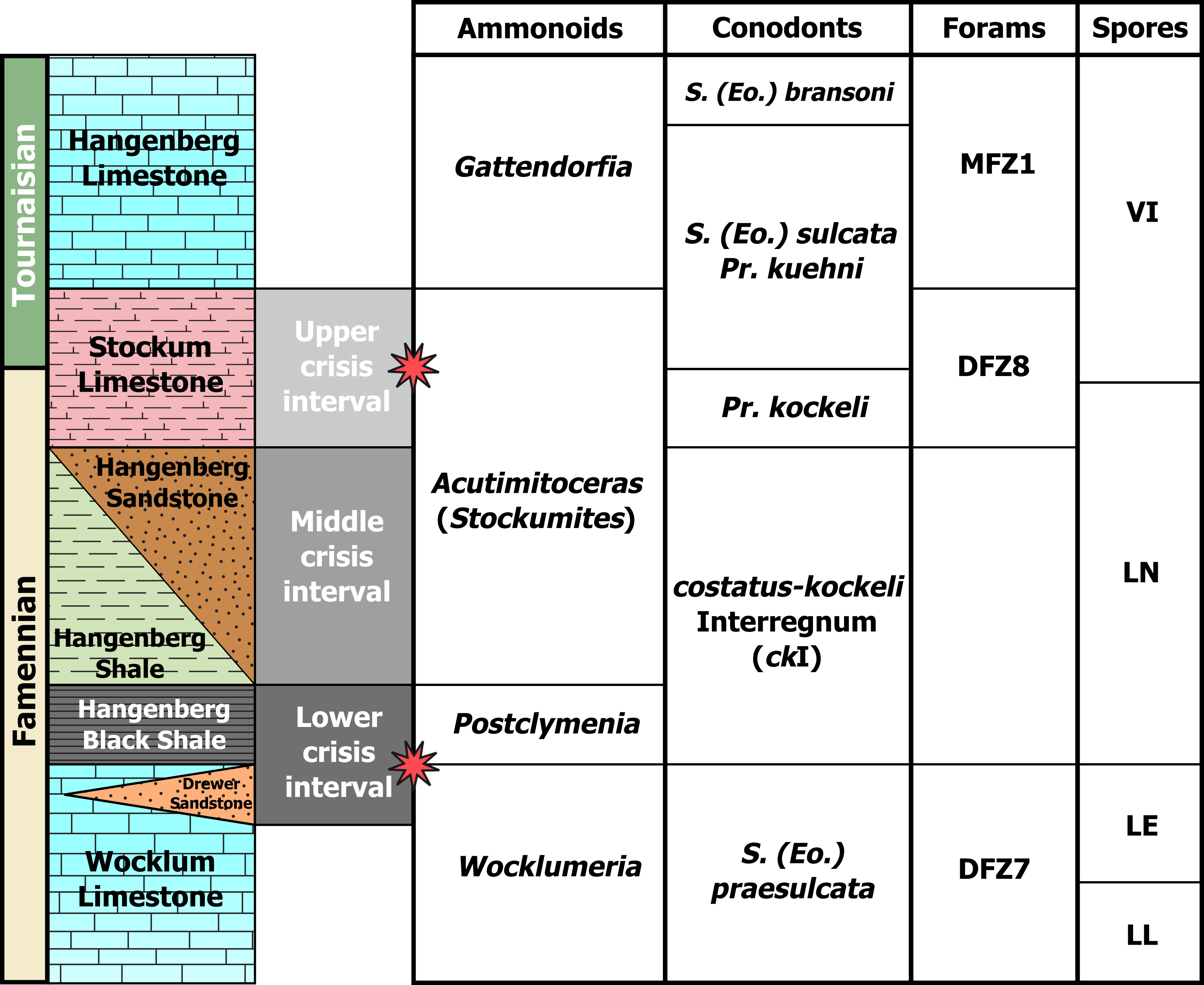
- Stratigraphy of the Hangenberg Event in the Rhenish Massif, Germany
- Date: Approximately 358.9 million years ago
- Location: Global, with notable deposits in Rhenish Massif, Poland, Morocco, and Ohio, United States
- Type: Mass extinction
- Cause: Likely anoxia, possible glaciation, euxinia, global cooling, and volcanism; supernova or asteroid impact are other hypotheses
- Outcome: Severe decline in marine and terrestrial biodiversity; significant extinction of ammonoids, brachiopods, stromatoporoids, and several fish groups; near-total loss of reef ecosystems

The Hangenberg event, also known as the Hangenberg crisis or end-Devonian extinction, is a mass extinction that occurred at the end of the Famennian, the last stage in the Devonian Period (roughly 358.9 ± 0.4 million years ago). It is usually considered the second-largest extinction in the Devonian Period, taking place around 13 million years after the Late Devonian mass extinction (Kellwasser event) at the Frasnian-Famennian boundary. The event is named after the Hangenberg Shale, which is part of a sequence that straddles the Devonian-Carboniferous boundary in the Rhenish Massif of Germany.

== Geological evidence ==
The Hangenberg Event can be recognized by its unique multi-phase sequence of sedimentary layers, representing a relatively short interval of time with extreme fluctuations in the climate, sea level, and diversity of life. The entire event had an estimated duration of 100,000 to several hundred thousand years, occupying the upper third of the 'Strunian' (latest Famennian), and a small portion of the early Tournaisian. It is named after the Hangenberg Black Shale, a distinctive layer of anoxic sediment originally found along the northern edge of the Rhenish Massif in Germany. This layer and its surrounding geological units define the "classic" Rhenish succession, one of the most well-studied geological examples of the extinction. Sequences equivalent to the Rhenish succession have been found at over 30 other sites on every continent except Antarctica, confirming the global nature of the Hangenberg Event.

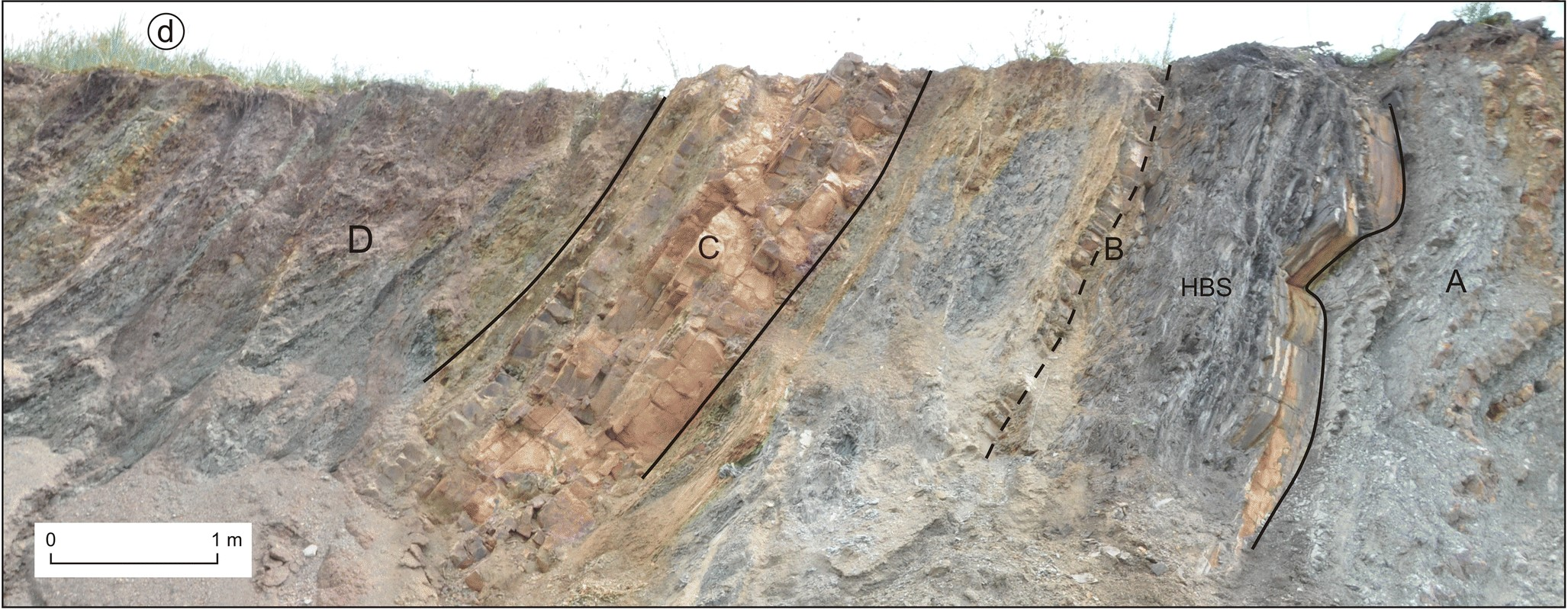
The Hangenberg succession at Kowala Quarry in Poland: A – cephalopod-rich nodular limestone (equivalent to Wocklum Limestone) B – marly shale, including the Hangenberg Black Shale (HBS) at its base C – marly limestone (equivalent to Stockum Limestone) D – marls and limestones (equivalent to Stockum Limestone and later units)

=== Prelude and extinction – the lower crisis interval ===
Below the Hangenberg Event strata is the Wocklum Limestone, a pelagic unit rich in fossils (especially ammonoids). In some places the Wocklum Limestone grades into the Drewer Sandstone, a thin turbidite deposit which initiates the lower crisis interval. Increased erosion and siliciclastic input indicates that the Drewer Sandstone was deposited during a minor marine regression (sea level fall). This may have been caused by a small glacial phase, but other evidence suggests a warm and wet climate at the time. The uppermost part of the Wocklum Limestone and the Drewer Sandstone occupy the LE spore zone. They also belong to the praesulcata conodont zone (named after Siphonodella/Eosiphonodella praesulcata) and the DFZ7 foraminifera zone (characterized by Quasiendothyra kobeitusana). The last pre-extinction ammonoid faunas are dominated by wocklumeriids, forming the Wocklumeria genozone (also known as the UD VI-D zone). A very short subzone (UD VI-D2) diagnosed by Epiwocklumeria occurs in the first few layers of the lower crisis interval.

The main marine extinction pulse begins abruptly with the subsequent deposition of the Hangenberg Black Shale, a layer of organic material deposited in anoxic deep-water environments. This is correlated with the beginning of the LN spore zone, indicated by the first occurrence of Verrucosisporites nitidus. However, in some areas the boundary between the LE and LN zones is unclear and possibly based on geography more than chronology. The black shale was deposited during a large marine transgression (sea level rise), as indicated by flooding reducing the input of terrestrial spores and increasing eutrophication. The Hangenberg Black Shale corresponds to the Postclymenia zone (UD VI-E), an ammonoid genozone based on massive extinctions within the group, rather than new occurrences. This is also the case for the costatus–kockeli Interregnum (ckI) conodont zone. Foraminifera disappear from the fossil record during the black shale interval. Uranium-Lead dating of ash beds in Poland provide dates of 358.97 ± 0.11 Ma and 358.89 ± 0.20 Ma below and above the black shale. This constrains the main marine extinction pulse to a duration of 50,000 to 190,000 years.

=== Glaciation – the middle crisis interval ===
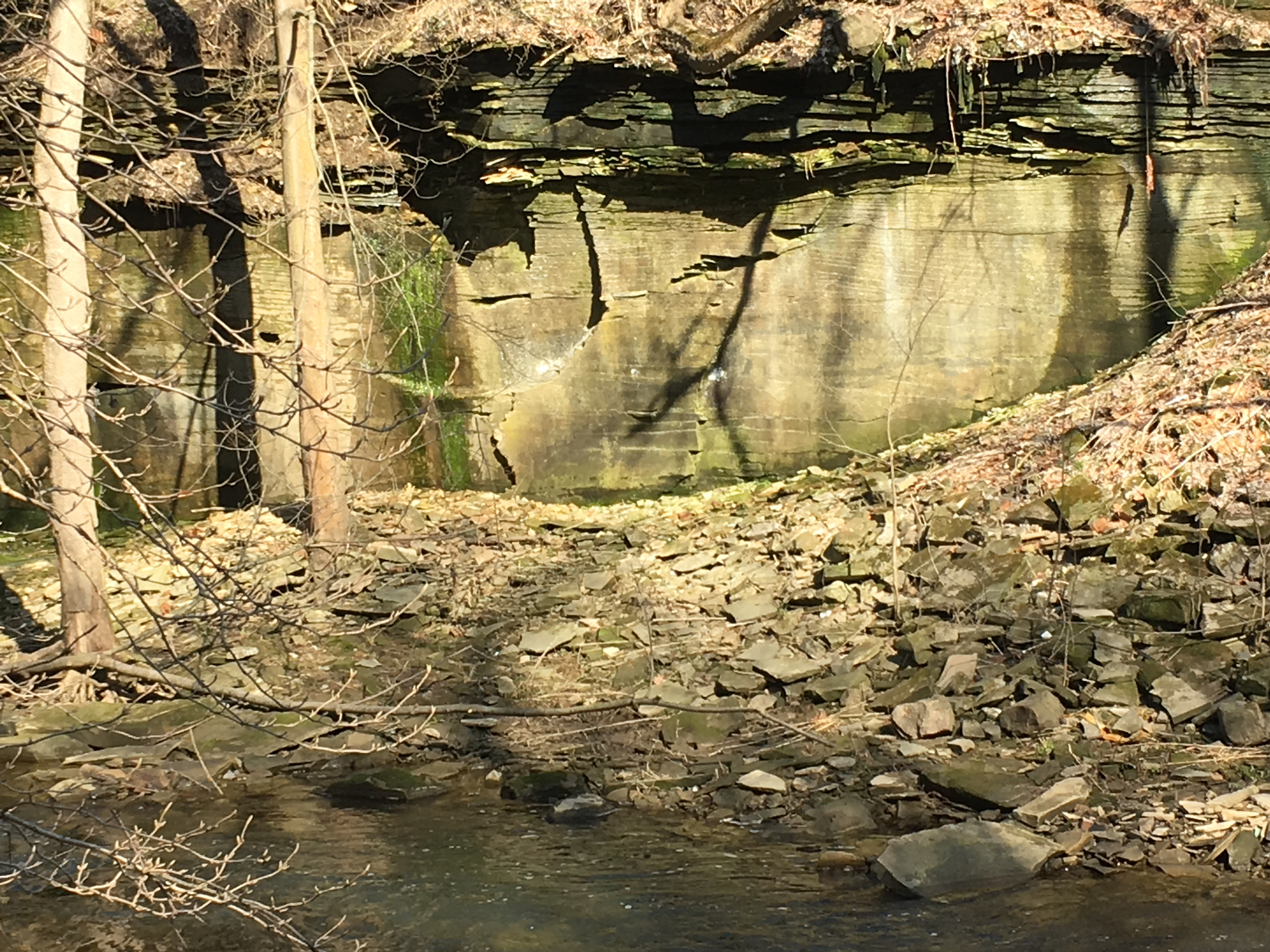
The Berea Sandstone of Ohio, a valley fill deposit equivalent to the Hangenberg Sandstone.

In the middle crisis interval, the black shale grades into a thicker deposit of more oxygenated shallow-water sediment. It may be represented by shale (Hangenberg Shale) or sandstone (Hangenberg Sandstone), and fossils are still rare. These layers are still within the ckI conodont zone and LN spore zone, and foraminifera are still absent. However, ammonoid fossils switch over to the lower Acutimitoceras (Stockumites) genozone (UD VI-F), indicating that post-Devonian ammonoids were beginning to diversify after the main extinction pulse. A major marine regression occurred during the middle crisis interval, as indicated by the increased amount of erosion and river-supplied siliciclastic material. Some areas even show deep incised valley fill deposits, where rivers have cut into their former floodplains. Strata in Morocco suggest that the sea level fell by more than 100 meters (328 feet) during the middle crisis interval.

This regression was caused by a cooling episode, and time-constrained glacial deposits have been found in Bolivia and Brazil (which would have been high-latitude areas), as well as the Appalachian Basin (which would have been a tropical alpine environment). These are known to have been deposited within the LE and/or LN spore zones, which are difficult to distinguish outside of Europe. Less well-constrained glacial deposits have also been found in Peru, Libya, South Africa, and central Africa. The Late Famennian glacial phase, along with other short glacial phases in the Tournaisian and Visean, acted as a prelude to the far larger and more prolonged Late Paleozoic Ice Age which stretched across much of the Late Carboniferous and Early Permian.

=== Aftershocks – the upper crisis interval ===
The upper crisis interval begins with the return of prominent carbonate rocks: a marly unit, the Stockum Limestone, spans the Devonian–Carboniferous (D–C) boundary. Foraminifera reappear in the fossil record within the Stockum Limestone, forming the DFZ8 zone characterized by Tournayellina pseudobeata. The base of the Stockum Limestone also sees the beginning of the Protognathodus kockeli conodont zone and further ammonoid diversification within the upper Acutimitoceras (Stockumites) genozone (LC I-A1). A major extinction among land plants and palynomorphs indicates the beginning of the VI spore zone shortly before the D–C boundary. 'Survivor' faunas of marine invertebrates, such as the last cymaclymeniid ammonoids and phacopid trilobites, also die out at this time, making it the second largest extinction pulse of the Hangenberg Crisis. Conodont zones (usually characterized by Protognathodus kuehni or Siphonodella/Eosiphonodella sulcata) define the D–C boundary, but difficulty in finding reliable and universal index taxa has complicated study of the boundary in many areas. The sea level fluctuated during the upper crisis interval, as several minor regressions and transgressions continued to occur around the D–C boundary. Nevertheless, the general trend was sea level rise, with the melting of the glaciers which formed in the middle crisis interval. In the early Tournaisian, the crisis finally ends at the base of the Hangenberg Limestone, a fossiliferous limestone superficially similar to the pre-crisis Wocklum Limestone. The base of the Hangenberg Limestone is characterized by the first occurrence of gattendorfiine ammonoids (making up the Gattendorfia genozone, LC I-A2) and the MFZ1 foraminifera zone.

== Extinction severity ==
Subdivision of the Devonian Period
← / Hangenberg event, Famennian glaciation; ← / Kellwasser event (Late Devonian mass extinction); ← / Widespread shrubs & trees; ← / Hunsrück fauna; ← / Rhynie chert
Subdivision of the Devonian according to the ICS, as of 2024; Vertical axis scale: Millions of years ago

Along with the Givetian and Frasnian stages, the Famennian was qualitatively acknowledged as having elevated extinction rates as early as Raup and Sepkoski's 1982 landmark paper on mass extinctions. However, late Famennian extinction rates were typically considered to be of lesser taxonomic severity than those in the Kellwasser Event, one of the "big five" mass extinctions. Depending on the method used, the Hangenberg Event typically falls between the fifth and tenth deadliest post-Cambrian mass extinctions, in terms of marine genera lost. Most estimates of proportional extinction have low resolution, only as fine as the stages in which the extinctions occur. This can lead to uncertainty in differentiating between the Hangenberg Event and other Famennian extinctions in broad-scale extinction trackers.

Benton (1995) estimated that 20–23.7% of all families went extinct in the Famennian, with marine families at a proportion of 1.2–20.4%. About 27.4–28.6% of continental families appear to have died out, but the early and low-diversity nature of Devonian continental life makes this estimate very imprecise.

Sepkoski (1996) plotted extinction rates for marine animal genera and families throughout the Phanerozoic. This study found that >45% of genera were lost during the Famennian, lowered to ~28% considering only "multiple interval" genera which appeared prior to the stage. The Famennian extinction(s) would be the eighth worst mass extinction by the latter metric. He also found that the percentage loss of "well-preserved" (hard tissue) marine genera in the last substage of the Famennian was around 21%, nearly as large as the rate in the last substage of the Frasnian. The Famennian-wide extinction rate for "multiple interval" marine animal families was around 16%. All of these estimates approached, but did not surpass, the end-Frasnian extinction, and the Givetian extinction(s) also surpassed the Famennian extinction(s) in the "multiple-interval" and "well-preserved" full-stage categories.

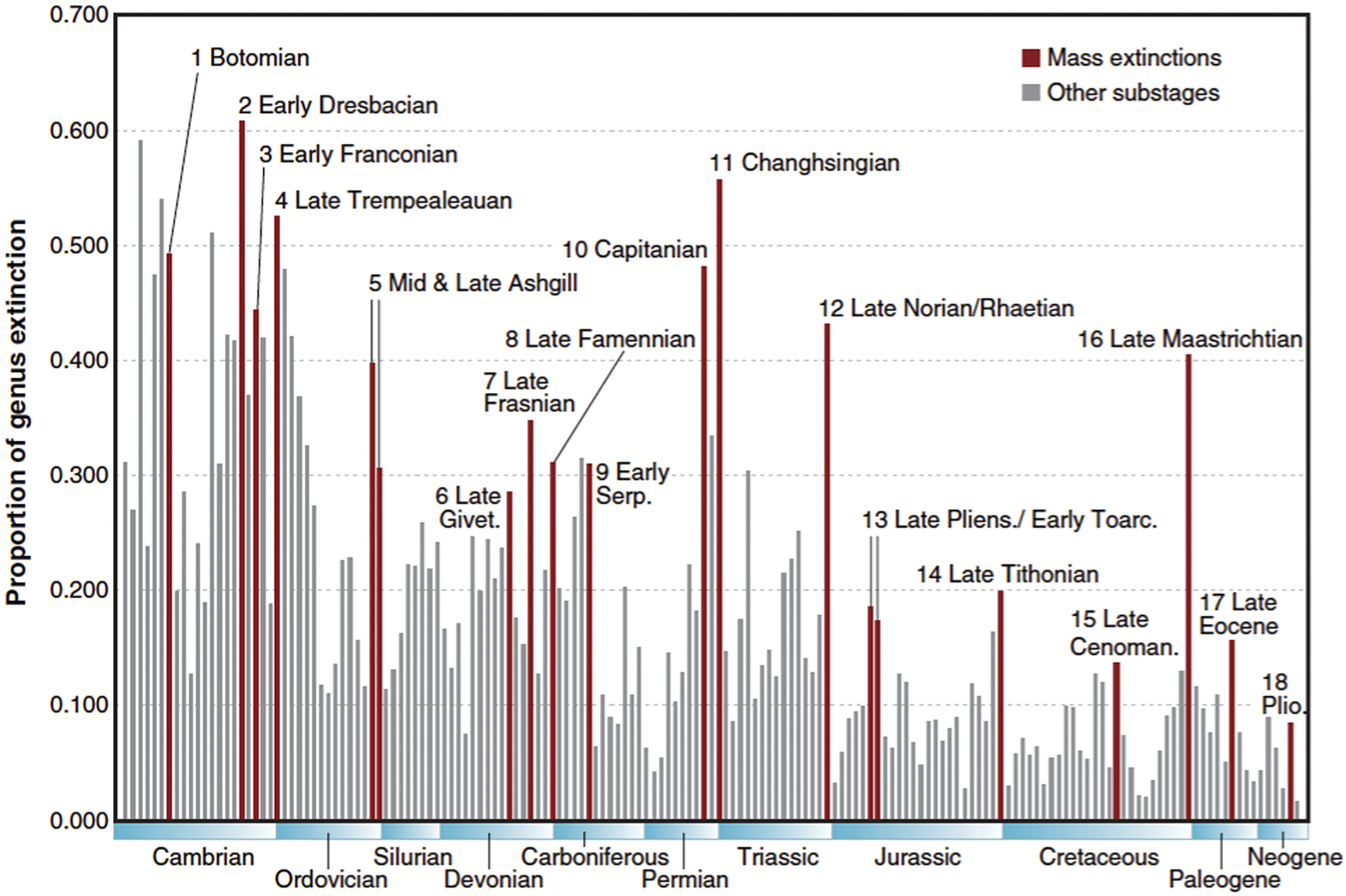
Major Phanerozoic extinctions tracked via proportional genera extinctions by Bambach (2006). The Hangenberg Event is labelled at "8 Late Famennian".

Using an updated biodiversity database, Bambach (2006) estimated that a total of 31% of marine genera died out in the last substage of the Famennian. By this metric, the Hangenberg Event was the joint seventh-worst post-Cambrian mass extinction, tied with the poorly-studied early Serpukhovian extinction in the Carboniferous.

McGhee et al. 2013 attempted to tackle extinction rates via a new resampling protocol designed to counter biases in biodiversity estimates, such as the Signor–Lipps effect and Pull of the Recent. They found a significantly higher extinction rate, with 50% of marine genera lost during the event. This estimate would rank the end-Famennian extinction as the fourth-deadliest mass extinction, ahead of the end-Frasnian extinction. They also ranked the end-Famennian mass extinction as the seventh most ecologically severe extinction, tied with the Hirnantian (end-Ordovician) mass extinction. This was justified by the fact that two whole communities within an ecological megaguild went extinct with no replacements. For the end-Famennian, these were chitinozoans within the pelagic filter-feeder megaguild, and stromatoporoids within the attached epifaunal (seabed-living) filter-feeder megaguild. Other taxa impacted by the extinction rediversified or their niches were filled rather quickly, but these communities were exceptions. By comparison, the end-Frasnian extinction was ranked as the fourth most ecologically-severe mass extinction, and the Givetian crisis was ranked as the eighth. Even in areas with oxygenated seabeds, such as parts of Morocco, the ecospace of Hangenberg event communities was restricted to only a few ecological groups, particularly slow-moving pelagic predators (i.e. ammonoids and acanthodians) and epifaunal sessile filter feeders (i.e. bivalves and bryozoans).

== Impact on life ==
=== Reef builders ===
Reef ecosystems disappeared from the fossil record during the Hangenberg Event, not returning until the late Tournaisian. Metazoan (coral and sponge) reefs had already been devastated by the Frasnian–Famennian event, and were still recovering during the Famennian. The end of the Famennian not only eliminated the metazoan reef community, but also many calcimicrobial reefs which were previously unscathed. Nevertheless, in the absence of pressures from metazoan communities, there was a brief resurgence of microbial carbonate in the early Tournaisian, a similar pattern to other mass extinctions.

The last true stromatoporoid sponges, a major group of Devonian reef builders, completely died out in the Hangenberg Event. Conversely, tabulate corals were apparently not strongly impacted. Rugose corals, which were already fairly rare, experienced a large extinction and ecological turnover before rediversifying in the Tournaisian. Bryozoans maintained high rates of both speciation and extinction during the late Famennian, with only a small drop in overall richness. The Hangenberg event effectively "refreshed" bryozoan diversity, eliminating old clades and allowing new forms to radiate and eventually reach a diversity peak in the Visean stage.

=== Other invertebrates ===
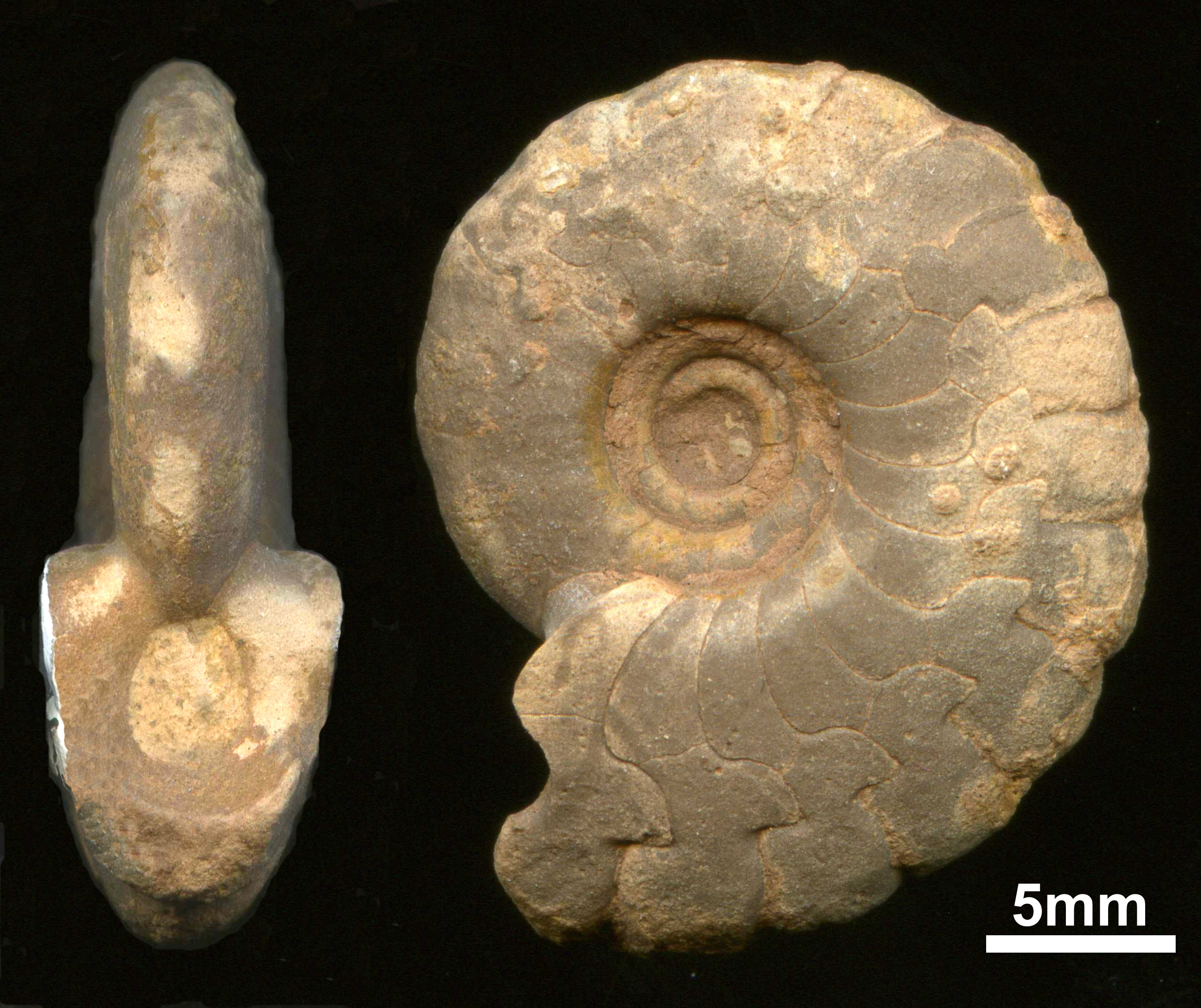
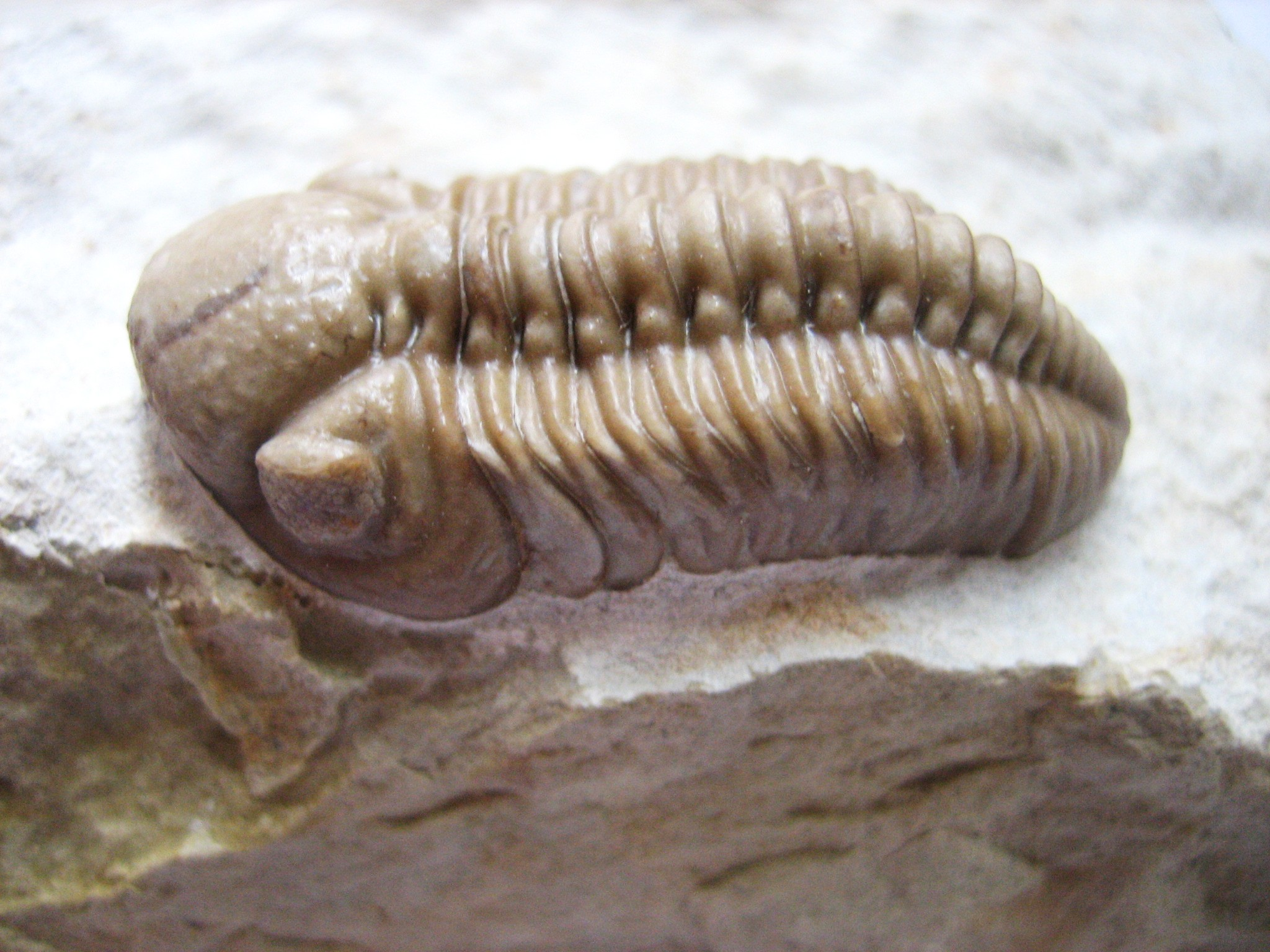
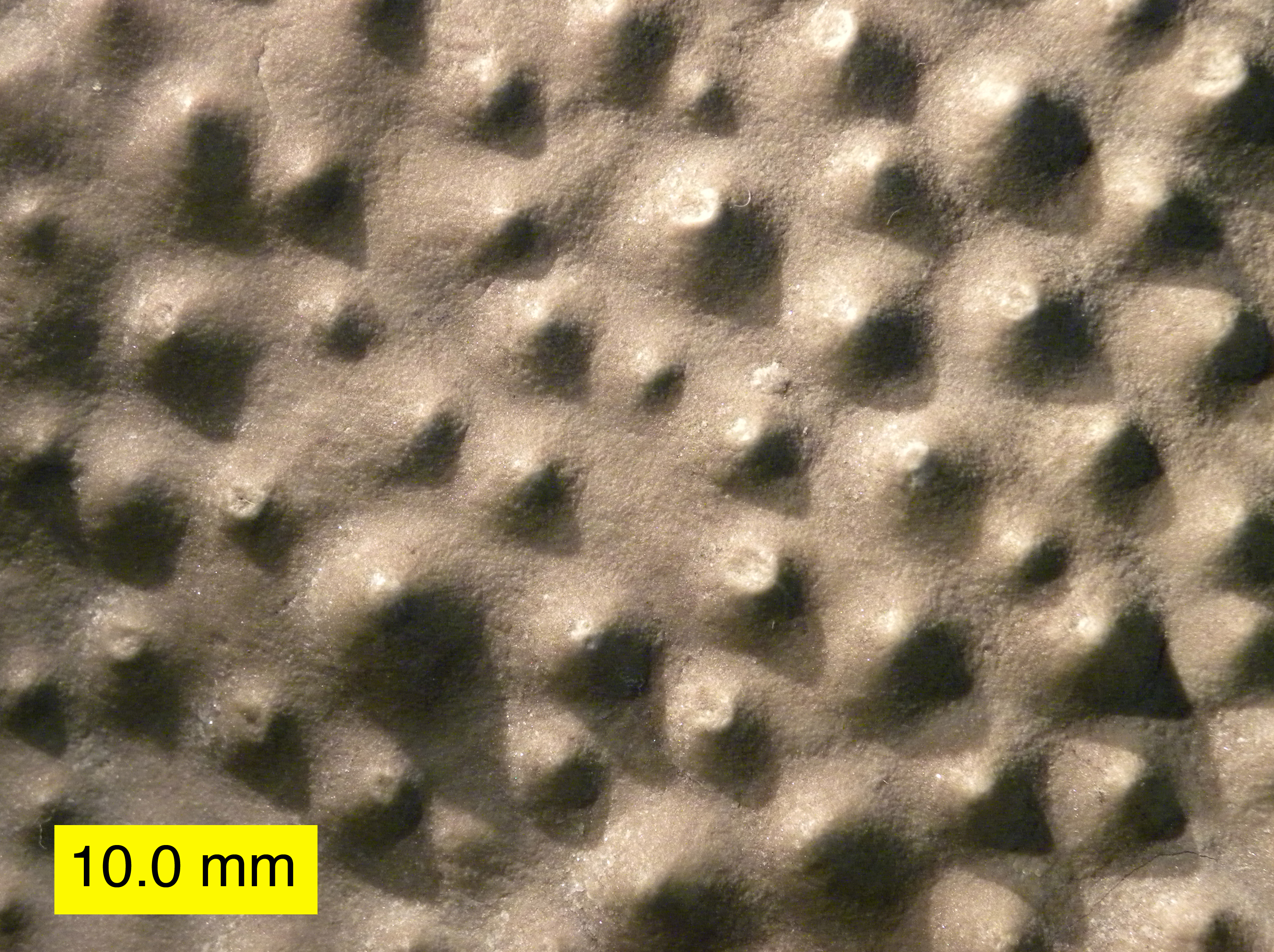
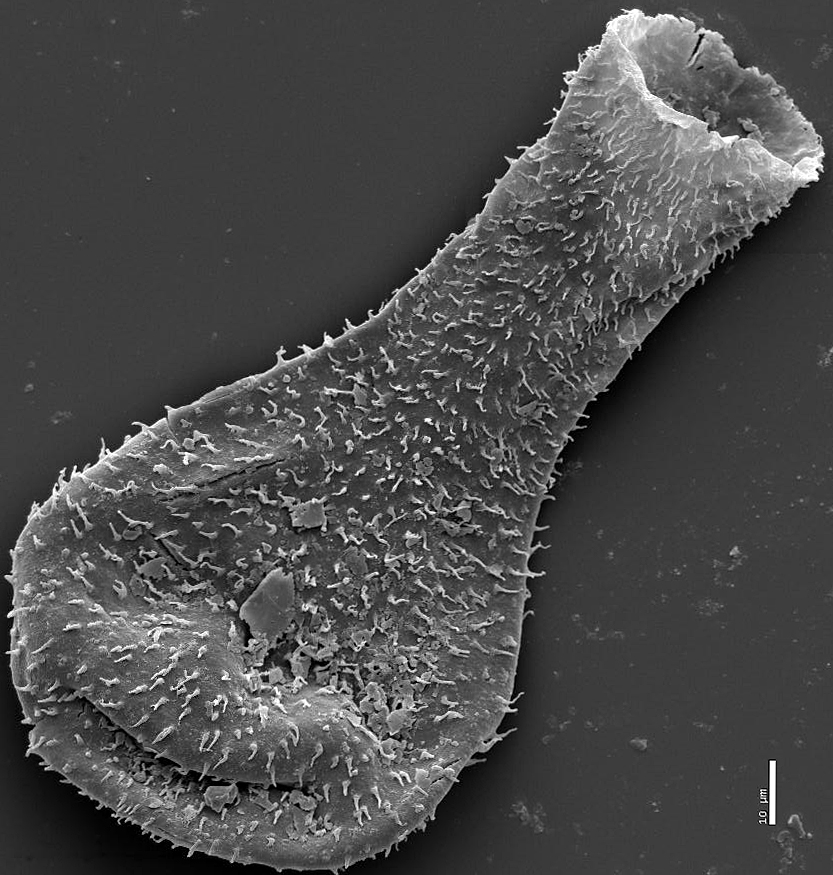
Ammonoids (such as Cymaclymenia, top left) nearly died out in the Hangenberg Event, while phacopid trilobites (top right), stromatoporoid sponges (bottom left), and chitinozoans (bottom right) all went extinct.

Ammonoids were nearly wiped out by the Hangenberg Event, a fact noted very early in the study of the extinction. One major Famennian group, the clymeniids, were already suffering smaller extinctions just prior to the event. Although clymeniids survived the extinction event itself, they became a dead clade walking and died out shortly after it. Ammonoid extinction rates were highest near the base of the Postclymenia evoluta zone, in the early part of the crisis. 75% of remaining families, 86% of genera, and 87% of species died out at this time. A few cymaclymeniids (including Postclymenia) briefly expanded into a cosmopolitan 'survivor' fauna, but ultimately died out at the end of the crisis. Only one ammonoid family, the Prionoceratidae, survived the full extinction interval and went on to rediversify into later goniatite groups.

Extinction in non-ammonoid nautiloids and gastropods is poorly studied, but appears to have been significant as well. Bivalves were barely affected, even in anoxic deep-water environments. Bivalves in the family Naiaditidae apparently took advantage of the Famennian glaciation to expand from polar regions towards the equator, sparking diversification in the Carboniferous tropics. Brachiopod diversity was somewhat impacted by the event, with survival largely based on ecology. Deep-water rhynchonellids and chonetids completely died out, but extinction among neritic (shallow-water) taxa is less clear-cut. Some neritic taxa expanded after the initial extinction pulse but died out at the end of the crisis with other members of the 'survivor' fauna. Crinoids survived relatively unscathed, and instead used the extinction as an opportunity to drastically increase their diversity and body size.

The two remaining orders of trilobites, Phacopida and Proetida, were strongly affected. The order Phacopida completely died out during the event. Deep-water phacopids were eradicated at the start of the crisis, while widespread shallow-water phacopids went extinct slightly later, alongside the cymaclymeniid ammonoids. Proetids were also hit hard, but several families in the group survived and rediversified quickly in the Tournaisian. Ostracods experienced notable faunal turnover, with groups such as leperditicopids dying out. At least 50% of pelagic ostracod species went extinct, with some areas having extinction rates up to 66%. Shallow-water species were less affected, with newer taxa replacing older ones late in the crisis.

Plankton suffered severe losses. Acritarchs declined strongly in the late Famennian and were very rare in the Tournaisian. Foraminifera also experienced very high extinction rates which devastated their formerly high diversity. Surviving forms were low in diversity and small in size, an example of the 'Lilliput effect' often seen after mass extinctions. The flask-shaped chitinozoans completely died out during the Hangenberg Event.

=== Chordates ===
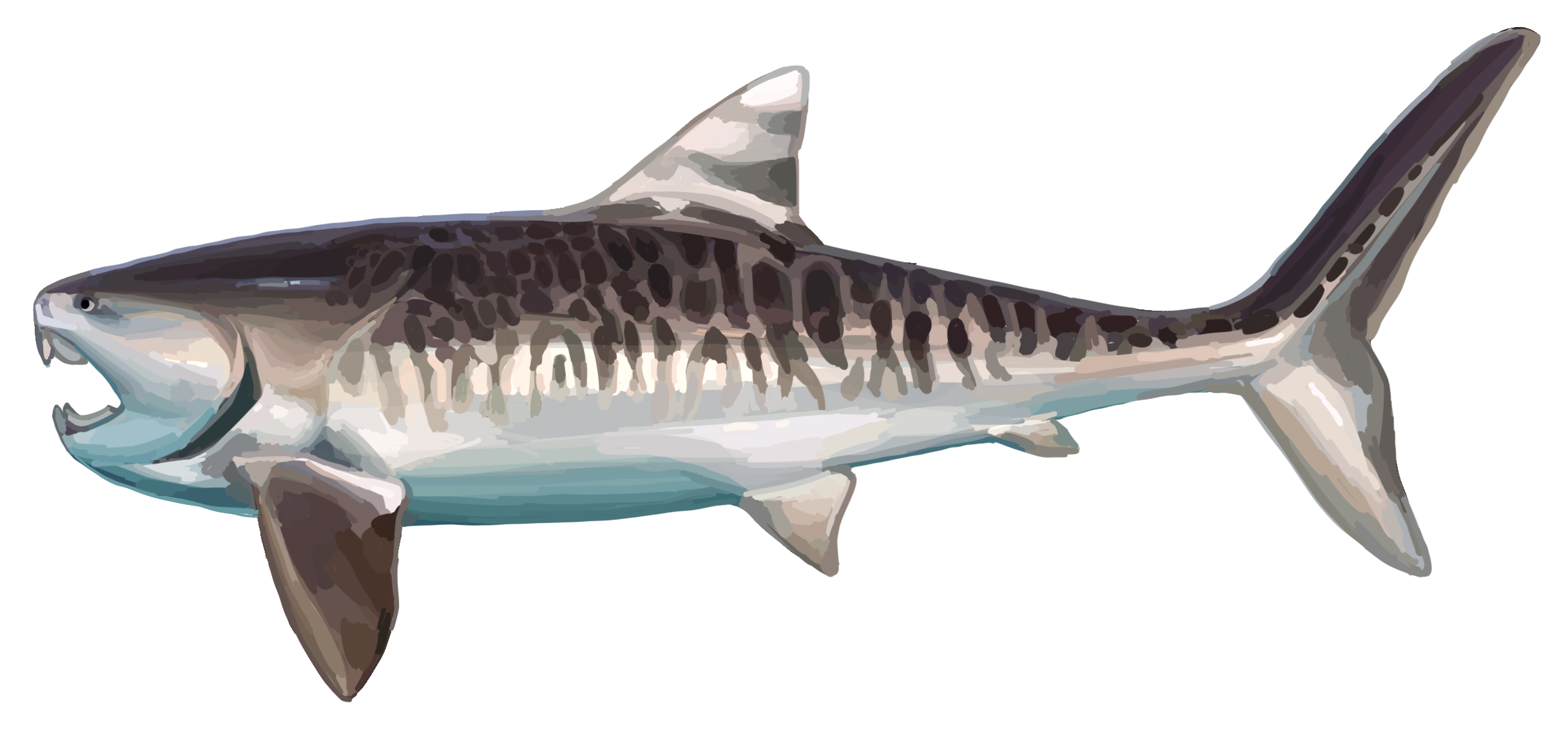
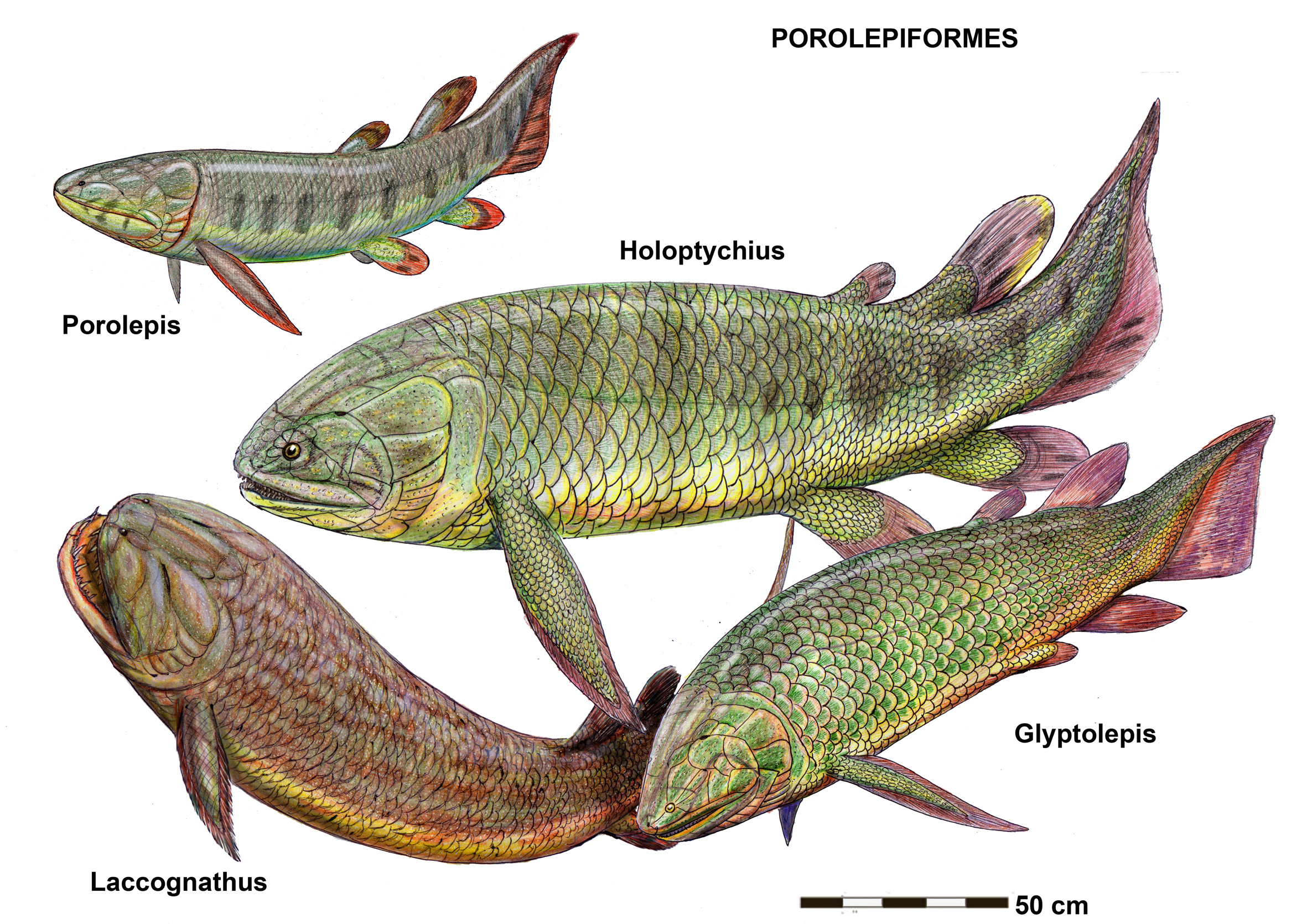
Placoderms (such as Dunkleosteus, top) went extinct in the Hangenberg Event, and sarcopterygians (such as porolepiforms, bottom) also suffered heavy losses.

Conodonts were moderately affected by the event, with different regions varying in the number of species lost. Pelagic conodonts had a total species extinction rate of about 40%, with some areas have a local rate as high as 72%. About 50% of neritic conodont species died out, with survivors characterized by their wide distribution and versatile ecology. Species diversity rebounded soon afterwards, returning close to pre-extinction levels by the middle of the Tournaisian. The Hangenberg Event has also been implicated in the final extinction of several agnathan (jawless fish) groups.

Other vertebrates apparently experienced a major ecological turnover across the Devonian–Carboniferous boundary. The Hangenberg Event's impact on vertebrate evolution approaches "Big Five" events such as the end-Cretaceous and end-Permian extinctions, and far exceeds the impact of the Kellwasser Event. Furthermore, because the vertebrate fossil record of the Famennian is sparse, many extinctions attributed to the Kellwasser event may have actually been caused by the Hangenberg event. Among vertebrates, 44% of high-level clades and over 96% of species were lost during the Hangenberg Event, which occurred globally and did not discriminate between freshwater and marine species.

Placoderm diversity had already decreased in the Kellwasser Event, and all remaining subgroups (arthrodires, antiarchs, phyllolepids, and ptychodontids) died out abruptly at the end of the Devonian. Sarcopterygians (lobe-finned fish) were also strongly affected: onychodontidans, porolepiforms, tristichopterids, and most other "osteolepidids" went extinct.

Some large fish, namely rhizodonts, megalichthyids, and a few acanthodians, survived but failed to significantly increase their ecological disparity, eventually dying out later in the Paleozoic. Dipnoans (lungfish) persisted through the extinction more easily than other sarcopterygians, though they were apparently extirpated from marine environments.

Among the most major ecological changes associated with the extinction are the rise of chondrichthyans (sharks and kin) and actinopterygians (ray-finned fish), which took over in diversity and relative abundance during the Early Carboniferous. These survivors were generally small and fast-breeding, resulting in a decrease in average vertebrate body size across the extinction. Even so, few Devonian chondrichthyan and actinopterygian species survived into the Carboniferous, indicating that these groups also experienced extinctions. Sharks that survived the extinction were greatly reduced in size; only sharks less than a meter long remained, and it would take 40 million years before they started to increase in size again.

Four-limbed vertebrates (stegocephalians, a.k.a. "tetrapods" in the broad sense of the term) evidently survived, eventually leading to the earliest true amphibians, who gave rise to the fully terrestrial (amniote) sauropsids and synapsids in the Carboniferous. However, no known Famennian "tetrapod" persisted into the Carboniferous, with "ichthyostegalian"-grade stegocephalians such as Ichthyostega and Acanthostega disappearing from the fossil record. A distinct gap in time traditionally separated the Famennian "tetrapod" faunas from their successors in the Early Carboniferous. This fossil hiatus, known as "Romer's Gap", has been linked to the Hangenberg Event. However, recent and continued discovery of many Visean and Tournaisian "tetrapods" has helped to close in this gap, suggesting that the Hangenberg Event affected some vertebrates less severely than previously thought. Coprolitic evidence from early Tournaisian deposits in eastern Greenland has also supported the notion that tetrapods were not as affected by the Hangenberg Event as previously thought.

=== Plants ===
During the Famennian, the world was covered by a fairly homogeneous and low-diversity land plant flora, dominated by giant Archaeopteris trees. The palynomorph Retispora lepidophyta was abundant in most spore zones used to define the terrestrial ecosystems of the Famennian. The major marine extinction pulse of the Hangenberg Event occurred at the boundary between the LE and LN zones, the third- and second-to-last spore zones of the Devonian, respectively. Plants were unaffected at this time.

The dominant flora started to decline near the end of the LN zone and the terrestrial ecosystem collapsed at the start of the VI zone, the last spore zone of the Devonian. This land plant extinction, which wiped out most or all of the Archaeopteris and R. lepidophyta floras, is correlated with the extinction of 'survivor' faunas in the latter part of the Hangenberg Event. Spore taxa that went extinct include specialized forms with divided spines (likely from an early form of lycopod) as well as widespread tiny spores (Retispora, Diducites, Rugospora) which were probably from fast-growing fern-like plants. Plants were significantly more affected by the Hangenberg event than by the Kellwasser event.

== Probable causes ==
=== Anoxia ===
The Hangenberg event was a global anoxic event (with oxygen deprivation in sea water), marked by a layer of black shale. Both the Kellwasser and Hangenberg events may have been linked to an increase in terrestrial plant cover. That would have led to increased nutrient supply in rivers and may have led to eutrophication (nutrient-driven algal blooms) in semi-restricted epicontinental seas. The first seed plants evolved during the Famennian and would have been more capable of exploiting and weathering upland environments away from river edges. However, support for a rapid increase in plant cover at the end of the Famennian is lacking.

==== Euxinia ====
Chemical analysis of cores in the Bakken Shale suggest that while it was being formed, successive eras of higher sea level corresponded with euxinic (high in toxic hydrogen sulfide and low in oxygen) water in the shallow ocean basin, which could kill animals in the ocean and near the shoreline. As oceans flooded terrestrial basins, water would have entered areas with high nutrient levels, leading to an algal bloom, removing oxygen and then creating hydrogen sulfide as the algae decayed.

=== Global cooling ===
Evidence such as glacial deposits in northern Brazil (near the Devonian South Pole) suggests widespread glaciation at the end of the Devonian, as a broad continental mass covered the polar region. The Hangenberg event has been associated with sea-level rise followed swiftly by glaciation-related sea-level fall, and thus a cause of the extinctions may have been an episode of severe global cooling and glaciation at the end of the Famennian, marking the dawn of the Late Palaeozoic Ice Age.

=== Volcanism ===
The Tian Shan Mountains of southern Uzbekistan record spikes in the concentration of coronene and mercury near the Devonian–Carboniferous boundary. This has led some researchers to hypothesize a volcanic cause for the Hangenberg event. If the Hangenberg event was influenced by volcanic activity, the Kola and Timan-Pechora magmatic provinces of northwest Russia are potential candidates for massive volcanism at the end of the Devonian.

== Other potential factors ==
=== Ozone depletion ===
One hypothesis for the cause of the last pulse of the extinction notes the abundance of malformed plant spores at the Devonian–Carboniferous boundary. This could implicate increased UV-B radiation and ozone depletion as the kill mechanism, at least for terrestrial organisms. Intense warming may lead to increased convection of water vapor in the atmosphere, reacting to inorganic chlorine compounds and producing ClO, an ozone-depleting compound. However, this mechanism has been criticized for its slow and weak effect on ozone concentrations, as well as its suspect rejection of volcanic influences.

Alternatively, cosmic rays from a nearby supernova could lead to a similar degree of ozone depletion. The impact of a nearby supernova can be supported or refuted by testing for trace amounts of Plutonium-244 in fossils, but these tests have not yet been undertaken. Ozone depletion could just as easily be explained by an increase in greenhouse gas concentrations resulting from an intense period of arc volcanism. The spore malformations may not even be related to UV radiation in the first place, and could simply be a result of volcanism-related environmental pressures such as acid rain.

=== Impact event ===
An asteroid impact has been suggested as a possible cause of the Hangenberg event. However, most impact craters, such as the Hangenberg-aged Woodleigh Crater, cannot be dated precisely enough to determine any causal relationship between the impact and the extinction event.

== See also ==
- Late Devonian extinction
- Kacak Event
- Taghanic event
