= Acanthoclymeniidae =

Acanthoclymeniidae Temporal range: Frasnian

Scientific classification
- Domain: Eukaryota
- Kingdom: Animalia
- Phylum: Mollusca
- Class: Cephalopoda
- Subclass: †Ammonoidea
- Order: †Agoniatitida
- Superfamily: †Gephurocerataceae
- Family: †Acanthoclymeniidae; Schindewolf, 1955

Type genus
- Acanthoclymenia Hyatt, 1900

Species
- Acanthoclymeniinae Schindewolf, 1955; Gogoceratinae Korn, 2002; Ponticeratinae Korn, 2002

Extinct family of cephalopods

Acanthoclymeniidae is a family of early, primitive, clymeniid ammonoid cephalopods that lived during the Late Devonian. At one time this family was known to contain a single genus, Acanthoclymenia, named by Hyatt in 1900, which is its type.

Acanthoclymeniidae are characterized by their small slightly involute, subdiscoidal, widely umbilicate shells that reach only a few centimeters in diameter. This description applies to the genus Acanthoclymenia as well.
