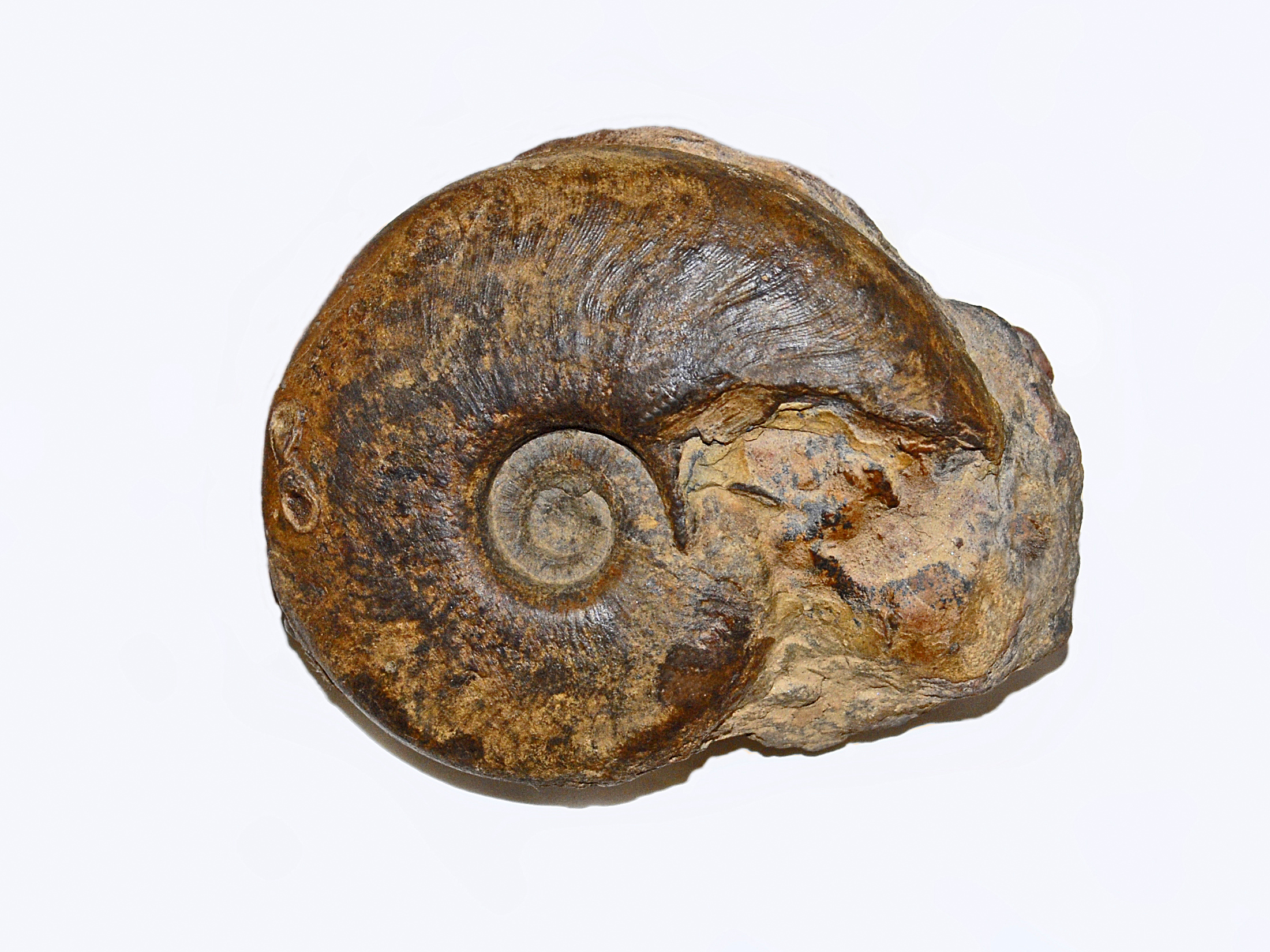
- Fossil of Beloceras sagittarium

Scientific classification
- Kingdom: Animalia
- Phylum: Mollusca
- Class: Cephalopoda
- Subclass: †Ammonoidea
- Order: †Agoniatitida
- Suborder: †Anarcestina
- Superfamily: †Beloceratoidea
- Family: †Beloceratidae; Hyatt, 1884

= Beloceratidae =

Beloceratidae Temporal range: Devonian

Family of ammonites included in the order Ceratitida

Beloceratidae is a family of ammonites included in the order Agoniatitida.

These fast-moving nektonic carnivores lived in the Late Devonian period, from 379.5 to 376.1 Ma.

== Genera ==
- Beloceras Hyatt 1884
- Eobeloceras Schindewolf 1936
- Mesobeloceras Glenister 1958
- Naplesites Yatskov 1990

== Distribution ==
Fossils of species within this genus have been found in the Devonian sediments of Algeria, France, Germany, Morocco, Spain and United States.
