= Late Devonian mass extinction =

Second of the big five mass extinctions

Comparison of the three episodes of extinction in the Late Devonian (Late D) to other mass extinction events in Earth's history. Plotted is the extinction intensity, calculated from marine genera.

The Late Devonian mass extinction, also known as the Kellwasser event, was a mass extinction event which occurred around 372.15 million years ago, at the boundary between the Frasnian and Famennian ages of the Late Devonian period. It is placed as one of the "Big Five" most severe mass extinction events in Earth's history, with likely around 40% of marine species going extinct, though the degree of severity is contested. A second mass extinction called the Hangenberg event, also known as the end-Devonian extinction, occurred 13 million years later around 358.86 million years ago, bringing an end to the Famennian and Devonian, as the world transitioned into the Carboniferous Period. The effects of the two extinction events have historically been conflated, and both events collectively profoundly reshaped marine ecosystems.

Although it is well established that there was a massive loss of biodiversity in the Late Devonian, the timespan of this event is uncertain, with estimates ranging from 500,000 to 25 million years, extending from the mid-Givetian to the end-Famennian. Some consider the extinction to be as many as seven distinct events, spread over about 25 million years, with notable extinctions at the ends of the Givetian, Frasnian, and Famennian ages.

By the Late Devonian, the land had been colonized by plants and insects. In the oceans, massive reefs were built by corals and stromatoporoids. Euramerica and Gondwana were beginning to converge into what would become Pangaea. The extinction seems to have only affected marine life. Hard-hit groups include brachiopods, trilobites, and reef-building organisms; the last almost completely disappeared. The causes of these extinctions are unclear. Leading hypotheses include changes in sea level and ocean anoxia, possibly triggered by global cooling or oceanic volcanism. The impact of a comet or another extraterrestrial body has also been suggested, such as the Siljan Ring event in Sweden. Some statistical analysis suggests that the decrease in diversity was caused more by a decrease in speciation than by an increase in extinctions. This might have been caused by invasions of cosmopolitan species, rather than by any single event. Placoderms were hit hard by the Kellwasser event and completely died out in the Hangenberg event, but most other jawed vertebrates were less strongly impacted. Agnathans (jawless fish) were in decline long before the end of the Frasnian and were nearly wiped out by the extinctions.

The extinction event was accompanied by widespread oceanic anoxia; that is, a lack of oxygen, prohibiting decay and allowing the preservation of organic matter. This, combined with the ability of porous reef rocks to hold oil, has led to Devonian rocks being an important source of oil, especially in Canada and the United States.

== Late Devonian world ==
Subdivision of the Devonian Period
| ← / Hangenberg event, Famennian glaciation; ← / Kellwasser event (Late Devonian mass extinction); ← / Widespread shrubs & trees; ← / Hunsrück fauna; ← / Rhynie chert |
Subdivision of the Devonian according to the ICS, as of 2024; Vertical axis scale: Millions of years ago

During the Late Devonian, the continents were arranged differently from today, with a supercontinent, Gondwana, covering much of the Southern Hemisphere. The continent of Siberia occupied the Northern Hemisphere, while an equatorial continent, Laurussia (formed by the collision of Baltica and Laurentia), was drifting towards Gondwana, closing the Rheic Ocean. The Caledonian Mountains were also growing across what is now the Scottish Highlands and Scandinavia, while the Appalachians rose over America.

The biota was also very different. Plants, which had been on land in forms similar to mosses and liverworts since the Ordovician, had just developed roots, seeds, and water transport systems that allowed them to survive away from places that were constantly wet—and so grew huge forests on the highlands. Several clades had developed a shrubby or tree-like habit by the Late Givetian, including the cladoxylalean ferns, lepidosigillarioid lycopsids, and aneurophyte and archaeopterid progymnosperms. Fish were also undergoing a huge radiation, and tetrapodomorphs, such as the Frasnian-age Tiktaalik, were beginning to evolve leg-like structures.

== Extinction patterns ==
The Kellwasser event and most other Later Devonian pulses primarily affected the marine community, and had a greater effect on shallow warm-water organisms than on cool-water organisms. The Kellwasser event's effects were also stronger at low latitudes than high ones. Large differences are observed between the biotas before and after the Frasnian-Famennian boundary, demonstrating the extinction event's magnitude.

=== Reef destruction ===
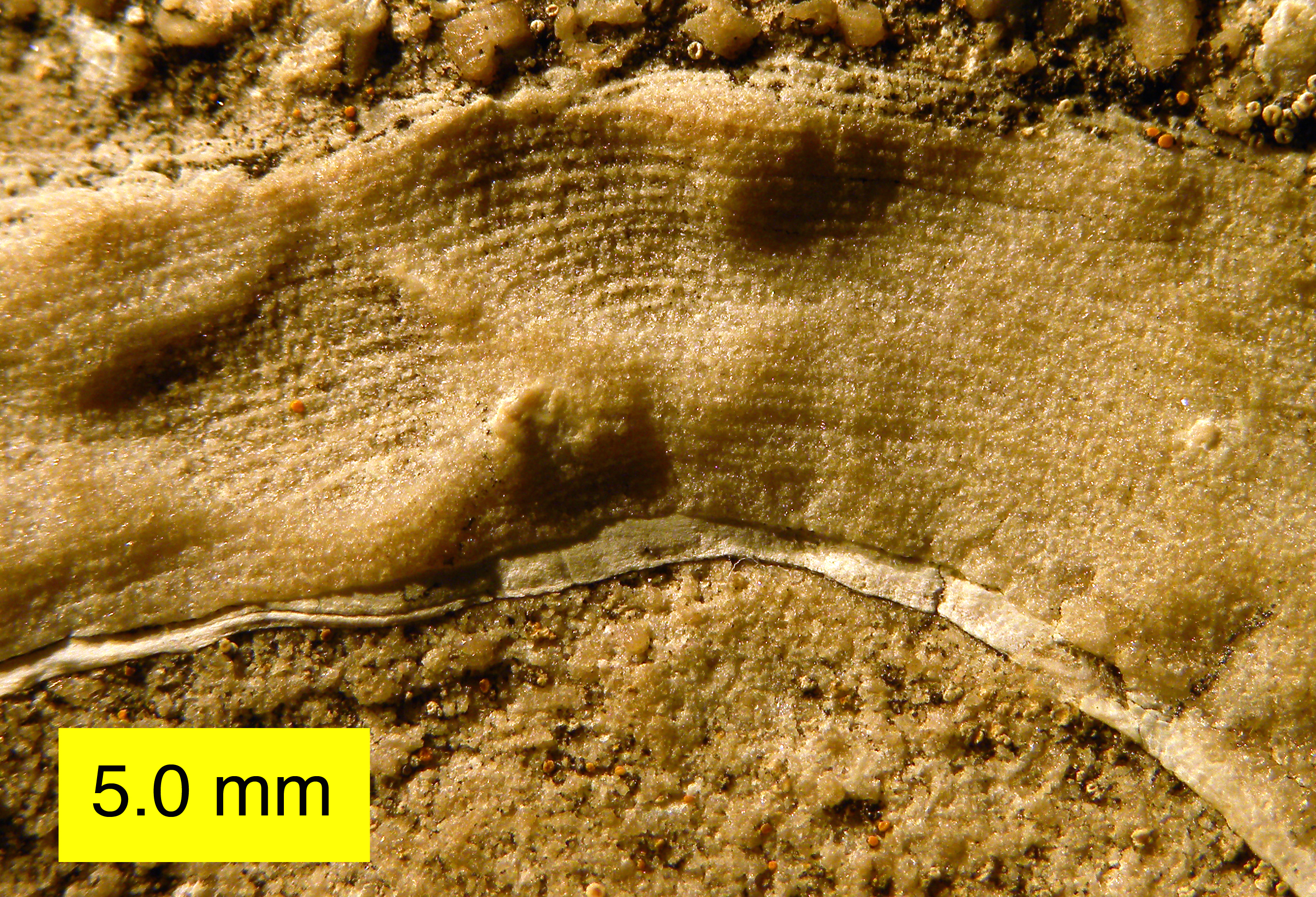
Side view of a stromatoporoid showing laminae and pillars; Columbus Limestone (Devonian) of Ohio

The most hard-hit biological category affected by the Kellwasser event were the calcite-based reef-builders of the great Devonian reef-systems, including the stromatoporoid sponges and the rugose and tabulate corals. It left communities of beloceratids and manticoceratids devastated. Following the Kellwasser event, reefs of the Famennian were primarily dominated by siliceous sponges and calcifying bacteria, producing structures such as oncolites and stromatolites, although there is evidence this shift in reef composition began prior to the Frasnian-Famennian boundary. The collapse of the reef system was so stark that it would take until the Mesozoic for reefs to recover their Middle Devonian extent. Mesozoic and modern reefs are based on scleractinian ("stony") corals, which would not evolve until the Triassic period. Devonian reef-builders are entirely extinct in the modern day: Stromatoporoids died out in the end-Devonian Hangenberg event, while rugose and tabulate corals went extinct at the Permian-Triassic extinction.

=== Marine arthropods ===
Trilobites were profoundly affected by the extinction event. Three trilobite orders went extinct: Corynexochida, Harpetida, and Odontopleurida. All three had been declining since the Taghanic event at the end of the Givetian, which also killed off the order Lichida. This left only two trilobites orders in the Famennian: Phacopida and Proetida. Trilobites which survived the Kellwasser event tended to prefer deep environments and tropical latitudes. A few small groups managed to thrive in the aftermath, namely phacopids and cyrtosymboline phillipsiids. These warm-water specialists would suffer during the cold snap of the Hangenberg event, cutting the post-Kellwasser recovery short.

Trilobites evolved smaller eyes in the run-up to the Kellwasser event, with eye size increasing again afterwards. This suggests vision was less important around the event, perhaps due to increasing water depth or turbidity. The brims of trilobites (i.e. the rims of their heads) also expanded across this period. The brims are thought to have served a respiratory purpose, and the increasing anoxia of waters led to an increase in their brim area in response.

Among ostracods, no families went extinct, but small-scale taxonomic units were severely impacted. Around 80% of ostracod species died out worldwide, though the extinction rate reached 91% in Eastern Europe. Both shallow and deep marine ("Thuringian") ostracods were impacted. Ostracods which could tolerate oxygen stress survived the extinction more easily, and endemic deep marine species diversified quickly in the aftermath.

=== Other marine invertebrates ===
Further taxa to be starkly affected include the brachiopods, ammonites, conodonts, acritarch and graptolites. Cystoids disappeared during this event. The surviving taxa show morphological trends through the event. Atrypid and strophomenid brachiopods became rarer, replaced in many niches by productids, whose spiny shells made them more resistant to predation and environmental disturbances.

As with most extinction events, specialist taxa occupying small niches were harder hit than generalists. Marine invertebrates that lived in warmer ecoregions were devastated more compared to those living in colder biomes.

=== Vertebrates ===
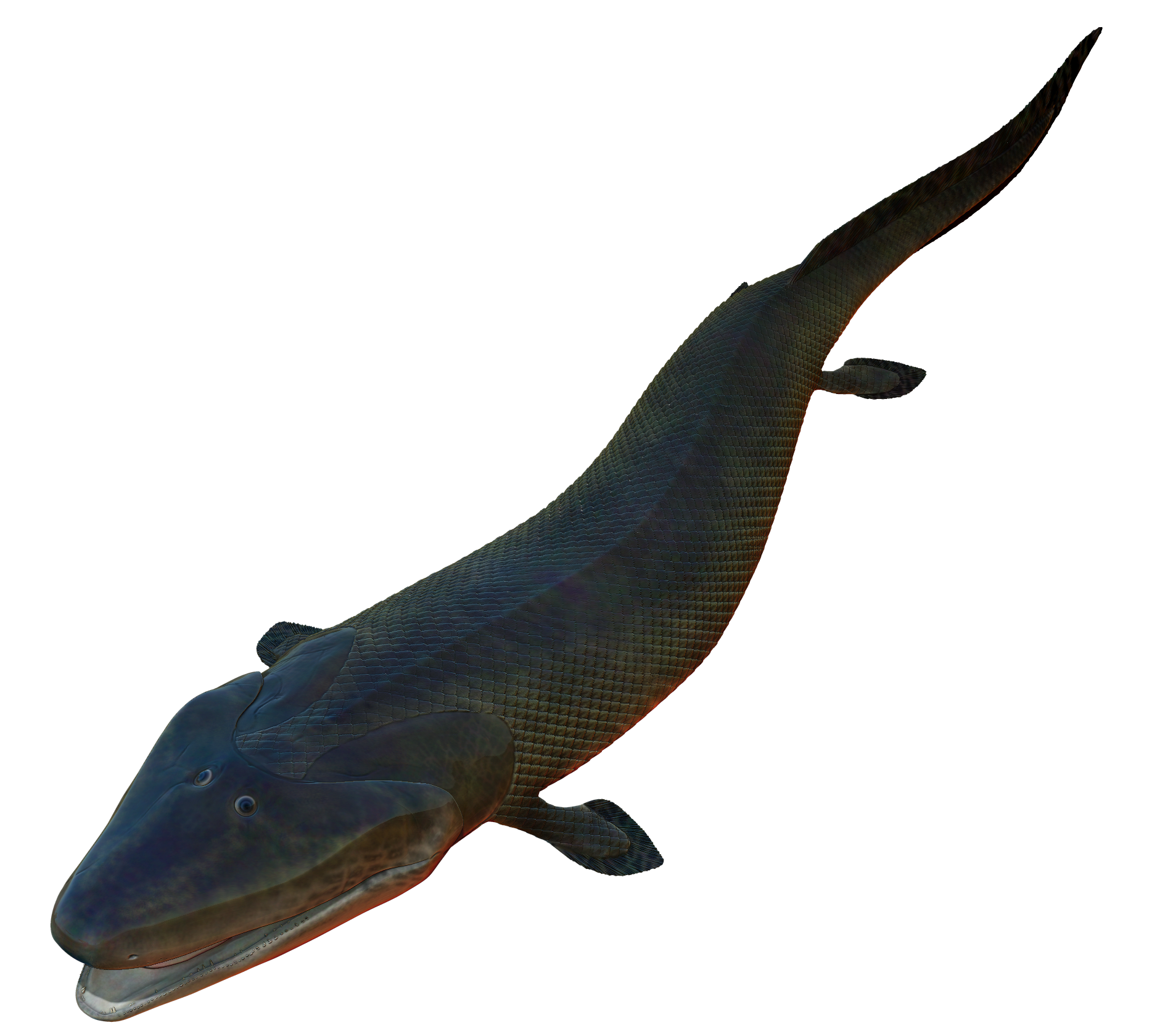
Tiktaalik, an early air-breathing elpistostegalian. They were among the vertebrates which died out due to the Kellwasser event

Vertebrates were not strongly affected by the Kellwasser event, but still experienced some diversity loss. Around half of placoderm families died out, primarily species-poor bottom-feeding groups. More diverse placoderm families survived the event only to succumb in the Hangenberg event at the end of the Devonian. Most lingering agnathan (jawless fish) groups, such as osteostracans, galeaspids, and heterostracans, also went extinct by the end of the Frasnian. The jawless thelodonts only barely survived, succumbing early in the Famennian. The shape of conodonts' feeding apparatus varied with the oxygen isotope ratio, and thus with the sea water temperature; this may relate to their occupying different trophic levels as nutrient input changed. Among freshwater and shallow marine tetrapodomorph fish, the tetrapod-like elpistostegalians (such as Tiktaalik) disappeared at the Frasnian-Famennian boundary. True tetrapods (defined as four-limbed vertebrates with digits) survived and experienced an evolutionary radiation following the Kellwasser extinction, though their fossils are rare until the mid-to-late Famennian.

=== Magnitude of diversity loss ===
The late Devonian crash in biodiversity was more drastic than the familiar extinction event that closed the Cretaceous. A 1996 survey by McGhee estimates that 22% of all the families of marine animals (largely invertebrates) were eliminated. The family is a great unit, and to lose so many signifies a deep loss of ecosystem diversity. On a smaller scale, 57% of genera and at least 75% of species did not survive into the Carboniferous. These latter estimates (Note: The species estimate is the toughest to assess and most likely to be adjusted.) need to be treated with a degree of caution, as the estimates of species loss depend on surveys of Devonian marine taxa that are perhaps not well enough known to assess their true rate of losses, so it is difficult to estimate the effects of differential preservation and sampling biases during the Devonian.

== Duration and timing ==
Extinction rates appear to have been higher than the background rate for an extended interval covering the last 20–25 million years of the Devonian. During this time, about eight to ten distinct events can be seen, of which two, the Kellwasser and the Hangenberg events, stand out as particularly severe. The Kellwasser event was preceded by a longer period of prolonged biodiversity loss.

The Kellwasser event, named for its type locality, the Kellwassertal in Lower Saxony, Germany, is the term given to the extinction pulse that occurred near the Frasnian–Famennian boundary (372.2 ± 1.6 Ma). Most references to the "Late Devonian extinction" are in fact referring to the Kellwasser, which was the first event to be detected based on marine invertebrate record and was the most severe of the extinction crises of the Late Devonian. There may in fact have been two closely spaced events here, as shown by the presence of two distinct anoxic shale layers.

There is evidence that the Kellwasser event was a two-pulsed event, with the two extinction pulses being separated by an interval of approximately 800,000 years. The second pulse was more severe than the first.

== Probable causes ==
Since the Kellwasser-related extinctions occurred over such a long time, it is difficult to assign a single cause, and indeed to separate cause from effect. From the end of the Middle Devonian (382.7±1.6 Ma), into the Late Devonian (382.7±1.6 Ma to 358.9±0.4 Ma), several environmental changes can be detected from the sedimentary record, which directly affected organisms and caused extinction. What caused these changes is somewhat more open to debate. Possible triggers for the Kellwasser event are as follows:

=== Anoxia ===
The main geological marker of the Kellwasser event is an abundance of black shale, which forms in stable anoxic (oxygen-deprived) seawater. Anoxic conditions correlate better with biotic crises than phases of cooling, suggesting anoxia may have played the dominant role in extinction. Numerous sites preserve a rapid increase in the rate of organic carbon burial and corresponding widespread anoxia in oceanic bottom waters. Signs of anoxia in shallow waters have also been described from a variety of localities. Shallow-water disruptions include photic zone euxinia: oxygen deprivation and a high concentration of toxic sulfides even in sunlit surface waters. This extreme case is documented by concurrent negative ∆^{199}Hg and positive δ^{202}Hg excursions in the North American Devonian Seaway. Elevated molybdenum concentrations further support widespread euxinic waters.

There is good evidence for high-frequency sea-level changes around the Frasnian–Famennian Kellwasser event, with one transgression (sea-level rise) associated with the onset of anoxic deposits; marine transgressions likely helped spread deoxygenated waters onto the continental shelf. Evidence exists for the modulation of the intensity of anoxia by Milankovitch cycles as well. Negative δ^{238}U excursions coinciding with both the Lower and Upper Kellwasser events provide direct evidence for an increase in anoxia.

The timing, magnitude, and causes of Kellwasser anoxia remain poorly understood. Anoxia was not omnipresent across the globe; in some regions, such as South China, the Frasnian-Famennian boundary instead shows evidence of increased oxygenation of the seafloor. Trace metal proxies in black shales from New York state point to anoxic conditions only occurring intermittently, being interrupted by oxic (oxygen-rich) intervals, further indicating that anoxia was not globally synchronous. The same finding is supported by the prevalence of seabed-living cyanobacterial mats in the Holy Cross Mountains in the time period around the Kellwasser event. Based on select European sections, some authors argued that Kellwasser anoxia was relegated to epicontinental seas and developed as a result of upwelling of poorly oxygenated waters within ocean basins into shallow waters rather than a global oceanic anoxic event that intruded into epicontinental seas.

==== Weathering aided by land plants ====
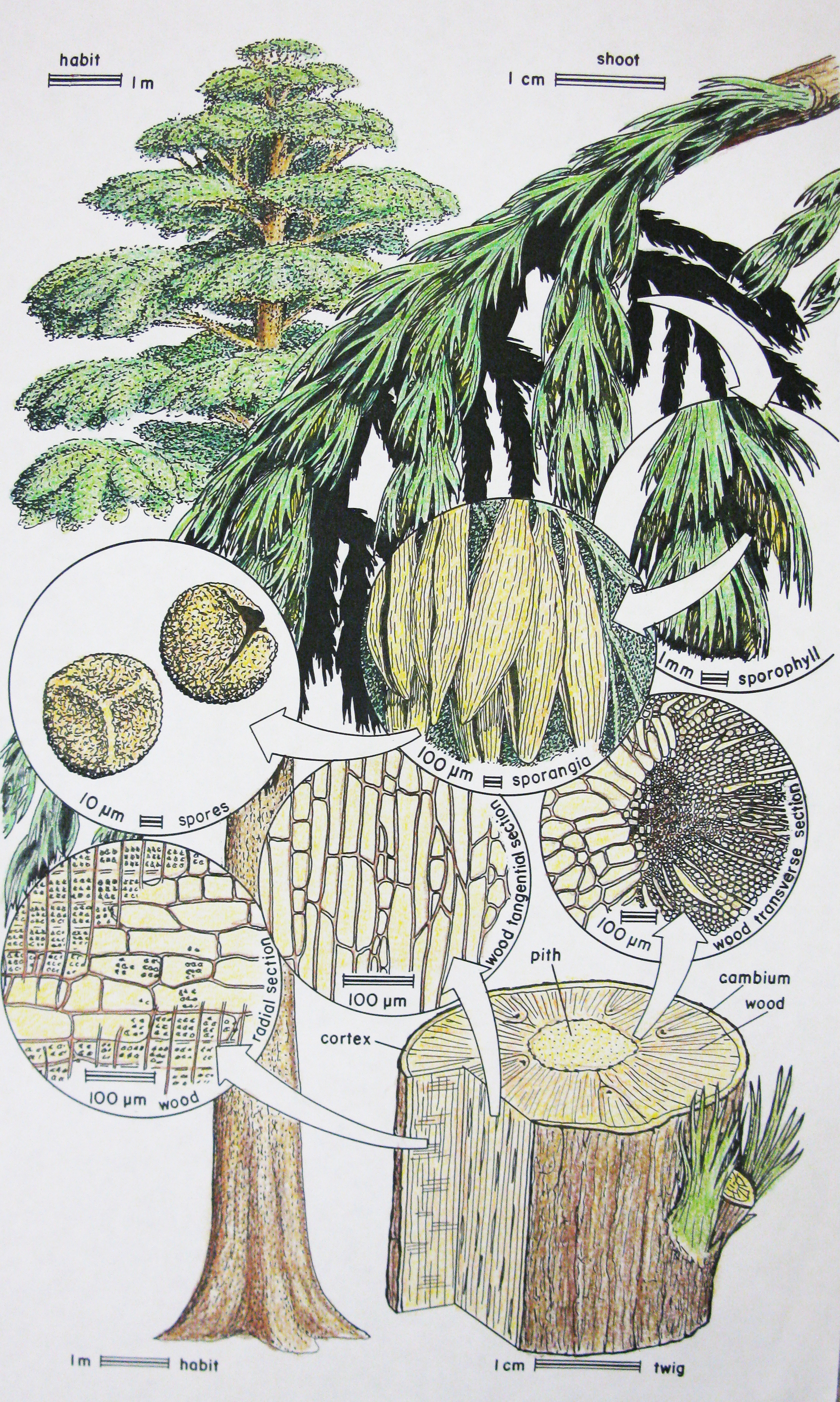
Archaeopteris, one of the earliest plants with deep roots capable of fracturing bedrock to release nutrients into the global system.

During the Late Silurian and Devonian, land plants, assisted by fungi, underwent a hugely significant phase of evolution known as the Silurian-Devonian Terrestrial Revolution. Their maximum height went from 30 cm at the start of the Devonian, to 30 m archaeopterid trees, at the end of the period. This increase in height was made possible by the evolution of advanced vascular systems, which permitted the growth of complex branching and rooting systems. These new vascular systems allowed plants to colonise drier areas previously off-limits to them. At the same time, the evolution of seeds let plants reproduce and disperse in areas which were not waterlogged, enabling them to spread further into inhospitable inland and upland areas.

The two factors combined to greatly magnify the role of plants in nutrient cycles on a global scale. In particular, Archaeopteris forests expanded rapidly during the Late Devonian. These tall trees required deep rooting systems to acquire water and nutrients, and to provide anchorage. The roots broke up the upper layers of bedrock and stabilized a deep layer of soil, which could have reached several meters thick. In contrast, early Devonian plants bore only rhizoids and rhizomes that could penetrate no more than a few centimeters. The mobilization of a large portion of soil had a huge effect: soil promotes weathering, the chemical breakdown of rocks. This released previously untapped swathes of ions such as phosphates, which are nutrients for plants and algae.

As rooted plants expanded into upland regions, the relatively sudden input of nutrients into river water may have caused eutrophication, harmful algal bloom and subsequent anoxia. During an algal bloom, organic material formed at the surface from dead algae can sink at such a rate that their decomposition uses up all available oxygen, creating anoxic conditions and suffocating bottom-dwelling fish. The fossil reefs of the Frasnian were dominated by stromatoporoids and (to a lesser degree) corals—organisms which only thrive in low-nutrient conditions. Therefore, the postulated influx of high levels of nutrients may have caused an extinction.

The idea that deep-rooting land plants contributed to anoxia has been conjectural for decades, since land-based sediments are very rare during the Late Devonian. One site in Greenland is a promising exception to this rule, tracking nutrient flows and climate change in inland lake deposits. The site's geochemical signals support a link between plant-led weathering, phosphorus runoff, and global cooling. According to one study, surges of volcanic activity would lead to high CO_{2} levels, and thus a warm, wet climate which encouraged plant growth. In response, the spread of plants would increase weathering and CO_{2} drawdown, creating massive anoxia and forcing the climate to shift to colder, drier conditions, moreso than before the volcanic activity. This cycle apparently repeated twice, once for each pulse of the Kellwasser Event. Another study used the same site to suggest increased river activity, not plants, as a main driver of weathering during a hot wet phase of the climate.

=== Global cooling ===
A positive δ^{18}O excursion is observed across the Frasnian-Famennian boundary in brachiopods from North America, Germany, Spain, Morocco, Siberia, and China; conodont apatite δ^{18}O excursions also occurred at this time. A similar positive δ^{18}O excursion in phosphates is known from the boundary, corresponding to a removal of atmospheric carbon dioxide and a global cooling event. This oxygen isotope excursion is known from time-equivalent strata in South China and in the western Palaeotethys, suggesting it was a globally synchronous climatic change. Alignment between the drop in global temperatures and the swift decline of metazoan reefs placed blame on global cooling as a factor in the extinction event.

The revolutionary spread of land plants during the Devonian corresponds to a long-term drop in CO_{2} levels in the atmosphere. Since CO_{2} is a greenhouse gas, reduced levels might have helped produce a chillier climate, in contrast to the warm climate of the Middle Devonian. The biological sequestration of carbon dioxide may have ultimately led to the beginning of the Late Palaeozoic Ice Age during the Famennian, which has been suggested as a cause of the Hangenberg event.

The weathering of silicate rocks also draws down CO_{2} from the atmosphere, and CO_{2} sequestration by mountain building has been suggested as a cause of the decline in greenhouse gases during the Frasnian-Famennian transition. This mountain-building may have also enhanced biological sequestration through an increase in nutrient runoff. The combination of silicate weathering and the burial of organic matter to decreased atmospheric CO_{2} concentrations from about 15 to three times present levels. Carbon in the form of plant matter would be produced on prodigious scales, and given the right conditions, could be stored and buried, eventually producing vast coal measures (e.g. in China) which locked the carbon out of the atmosphere and into the lithosphere. This reduction in atmospheric CO_{2} would have caused global cooling and resulted in at least one period of late Devonian glaciation (and subsequent sea level fall), probably fluctuating in intensity alongside the 40ka Milankovic cycle. The continued drawdown of organic carbon eventually pulled the Earth out of its greenhouse state during the Famennian into the icehouse that continued throughout the Carboniferous and Permian.

=== Volcanism ===
Magmatism was suggested as a cause of the Late Devonian extinction in 2002. The end of the Devonian Period had extremely widespread trap magmatism and rifting in the Russian and Siberian platforms, which were situated above the hot mantle plumes and suggested as a cause of the Frasnian / Famennian and end-Devonian extinctions. The Viluy Large igneous province, located in the Vilyuysk region on the Siberian Craton, covers most of the present day north-eastern margin of the Siberian Platform. The triple-junction rift system was formed during the Devonian Period; the Viluy rift is the western remaining branch of the system and two other branches form the modern margin of the Siberian Platform. Volcanic rocks are covered with post Late Devonian–Early Carboniferous sediments.

Volcanic rocks, dyke belts, and sills that cover more than 320,000 km^{2}, and a gigantic amount of magmatic material (more than 1 million km^{3}) formed in the Viluy branch. The Viluy and Pripyat-Dnieper-Donets large igneous provinces were suggested to correlate with the Frasnian / Famennian extinction, with the Kola and Timan-Pechora magmatic provinces being suggested to be related to the Hangenberg event at the Devonian-Carboniferous boundary. Viluy magmatism may have injected enough CO_{2} and SO_{2} into the atmosphere to have generated a destabilised greenhouse and ecosystem, causing rapid global cooling, sea-level falls, and marine anoxia to occur during Kellwasser black shale deposition. Viluy Traps activity may have also enabled euxinia by fertilising the oceans with sulphate, increasing rates of microbial sulphate reduction.

Recent studies have confirmed a correlation between Viluy traps in the Vilyuysk region on the Siberian Craton and the Kellwasser extinction by ^{40}Ar/^{39}Ar dating. Ages show that the two volcanic phase hypotheses are well supported and the weighted mean ages of each volcanic phase are 376.7±3.4 and 364.4±3.4 Ma, or 373.4±2.1 and 363.2±2.0 Ma, which the first volcanic phase is in agreement with the age of 372.2±3.2 Ma proposed for the Kellwasser event. However, the second volcanic phase is slightly older than Hangenberg event, which is dated to around 358.9±1.2 Ma.

Coronene and mercury enrichment has been found in deposits dating back to the Kellwasser event, with similar enrichments found in deposits coeval with the Frasnes event at the Givetian-Frasnian boundary and in ones coeval with the Hangenberg event. Because coronene enrichment is only known in association with large igneous province emissions and extraterrestrial impacts and the fact that there is no confirmed evidence of the latter occurring in association with the Kellwasser event, this enrichment strongly suggests a causal relationship between volcanism and the Kellwasser extinction event. However, not all sites show evidence of mercury enrichment across the Frasnian-Famennian boundary, leading other studies to reject volcanism as an explanation for the crisis.

Another overlooked contributor to the Kellwasser mass extinction could be the now extinct Cerberean Caldera which was active in the Late Devonian period and thought to have undergone a supereruption approximately 374 million years ago. (Note: Though a super eruption on its own would have devastating effects in both short term and long term, the Late Devonian extinction was caused by a series of events which contributed to the extinction.) Remains of this caldera can be found in the modern day state of Victoria, Australia. Eovariscan volcanic activity in present-day Europe may have also played a role in conjunction with the Viluy Traps.

== Other potential factors ==
=== Impact event ===
Bolide impacts can be dramatic triggers of mass extinctions. A few studies have proposed an asteroid impact as the prime cause of this faunal turnover. The impact that created the Siljan Ring in Sweden either happened just before the Kellwasser event or coincided with it. Most impact craters, such as the Frasnian-age Alamo impact in Nevada, cannot generally be dated with sufficient precision to link them to the event; others dated precisely are not contemporaneous with the extinction. Although some evidence of meteoric impact have been observed in places, including iridium anomalies and microspherules, these were probably caused by other factors. Some lines of evidence suggest that the meteorite impact and its associated geochemical signals postdate the extinction event. Modelling studies have ruled out a single impact as entirely inconsistent with available evidence, although a multiple impact scenario may still be viable.

=== Supernova ===
Near-Earth supernovae have been speculated as possible drivers of mass extinctions due to their ability to cause ozone depletion. A recent explanation suggests that a nearby supernova explosion was the cause for the specific Hangenberg event, which marks the boundary between the Devonian and Carboniferous periods. This could offer a possible explanation for the dramatic drop in atmospheric ozone during the Hangenberg event that could have permitted massive ultraviolet damage to the genetic material of lifeforms, triggering a mass extinction. Recent research offers evidence of ultraviolet damage to pollen and spores over many thousands of years during this event as observed in the fossil record and that, in turn, points to a possible long-term destruction of the ozone layer. A supernova explosion is an alternative explanation to global temperature rise, that could account for the drop in atmospheric ozone. Because very high mass stars, required to produce a supernova, tend to form in dense star-forming regions of space and have short lifespans lasting only at most tens of millions of years, it is likely that if a supernova did occur, multiple others also did within a few million years of it. Thus, supernovae have also been speculated to have been responsible for the Kellwasser event, as well as the entire sequence of environmental crises covering several millions of years towards the end of the Devonian period. Detecting either of the long-lived, extra-terrestrial radioisotopes ^{146}Sm or ^{244}Pu in one or more end-Devonian extinction strata would confirm a supernova origin. However, there is currently no direct evidence for this hypothesis.

=== Other hypotheses ===
Other mechanisms put forward to explain the extinctions include tectonic-driven climate change, sea-level change, and oceanic overturning. These have all been discounted because they are unable to explain the duration, selectivity, and periodicity of the extinctions.

== See also ==
- Evolutionary history of plants

== Sources ==
- McGhee, George R. (1996). The late Devonian mass extinction: the Frasnian Famennian crisis. Critical moments in paleobiology and earth history series. New York: Columbia University Press. p. 9. ISBN 978-0-231-07505-3.
- Racki, Grzegorz (2005). "Toward understanding Late Devonian global events: few answers, many questions". In Over, D. Jeffrey (ed.). Understanding Late Devonian and Permian-Triassic biotic and climate events: towards an integrated approach. Developments in palaeontology and stratigraphy (1. ed.). Amsterdam: Elsevier. ISBN 978-0-444-52127-9.
