= Retispora lepidophyta =

Scientific classification
- Kingdom: Plantae
- Clade: Tracheophytes
- Clade: Lycophytes
- Class: Lycopodiopsida
- Order: Selaginellales
- Family: incertae sedis
- Genus: †Retispora
- Species: †R. lepidophyta

Binomial name
- †Retispora lepidophyta (Kedo) Playford

Synonyms
- Hymenozonotriletes lepidophytus; Spelaeotriletes lepidophytus.

Spore type and an important biostratigraphic marker of the latest Devonian period

Retispora lepidophyta is a spore type and an important biostratigraphic marker of the latest Devonian period. The last appearance of Retispora lepidophyta defines the Devonian-Mississippian boundary in Belgium and other places.

== Description ==
Retispora is trilete, reticulate, and has a distinctly "fried egg" appearance, as the spore is zonate, and the inner area is much darker than the outer area.
