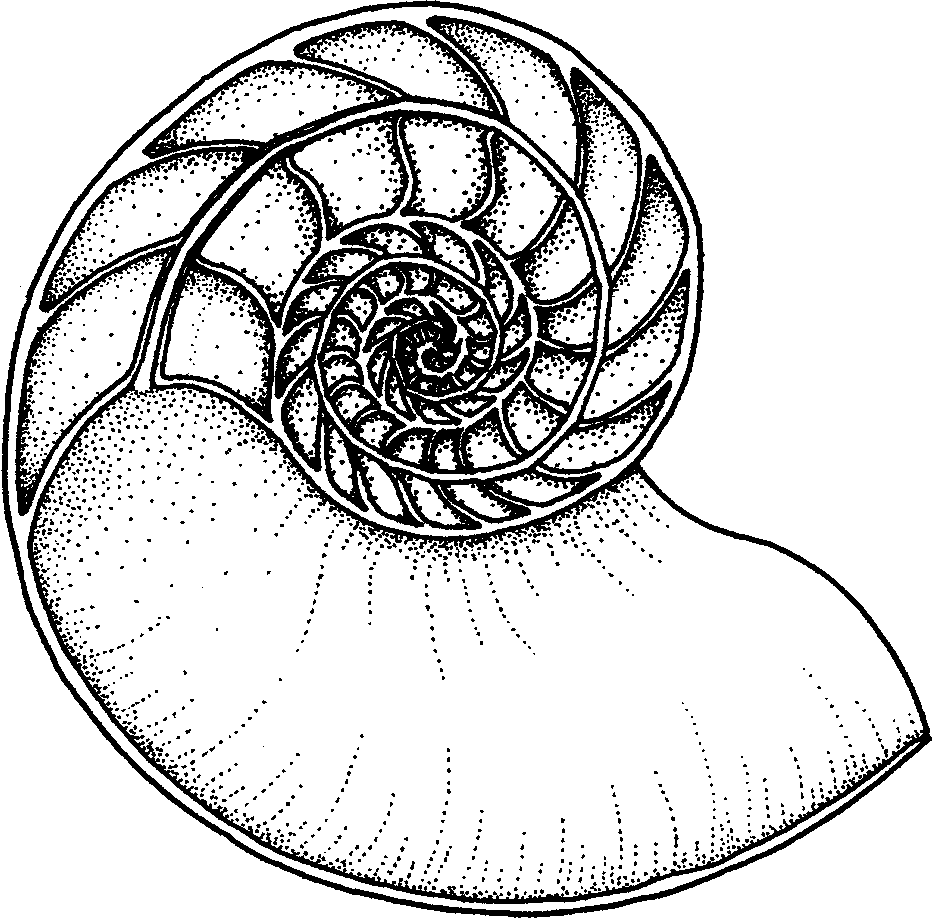
- An image showing the siphuncle (which could be agoniatitid), the tube which connects the current living shell to the previous ones. They have been dead for many years as we have found fossils.

Scientific classification
- Kingdom: Animalia
- Phylum: Mollusca
- Class: Cephalopoda
- Subclass: †Ammonoidea
- Order: †Agoniatitida; Ruzhencev, 1957

Suborders
- Agoniatitina; Anarcestina; Auguritina; Gephuroceratina; Gephurocerina; Pharciceratina; Timanocerina

= Agoniatitida =

Agoniatitida Temporal range: 409 – 384 Ma Late Pragian – Middle Givetian

Extinct order of molluscs

Agoniatitida, also known as the Anarcestida, is the ancestral order within the cephalopod subclass Ammonoidea originating from bactritoid nautiloids, that lived in what would become Africa, Asia, Australia, Europe, and North America during the Devonian from about the lower boundary of Zlichovian stage (corresponding to late Pragian, after 409.1 mya) into the Taghanic event during the upper middle Givetian (between 385 and 384 mya), existing for approximately 25 million years.

== Taxonomic nomenclature ==
The Order Agoniatitida, named by Ruzhencev, 1957, is a subjective synonym for the Order Anarcestida, named by Miller and Furnish, 1954. Accordingly, the name Anarcerstida is based on the family Anarcestidae (ex Anarcestinae) of Steinmann 1890. That of Agoniatiida is based on the family Agnoniatidae of Holzapfel, 1899.

Saunders, Work, and Nikolaeva, 1999, refer to the Anarcestida, with Agoniatina a suborder, maintaining the priority as found in the Treatise. Shevyrev, 2006 on the other hand follows Ruzhencev, 1957 and used Agonititida.

== Morphology ==
Agoniatitids are primitive ammonoids with a ventral retrochoanitic siphuncle (septal necks point to the rear) reflective of their nautiloid ancestors and goniatitic sutures with a variable number of lobes. Shells vary from discoidal to globular. Coiling may be loose with whorls barely touching or tight with a dorsal impression.

== Fossil distribution ==
Fossils are restricted to strata of the Zlichovian (Late Pragian/Early Emsian) to late middle Givetian epochs.
